= Hyatt Regency =

Hotel brand

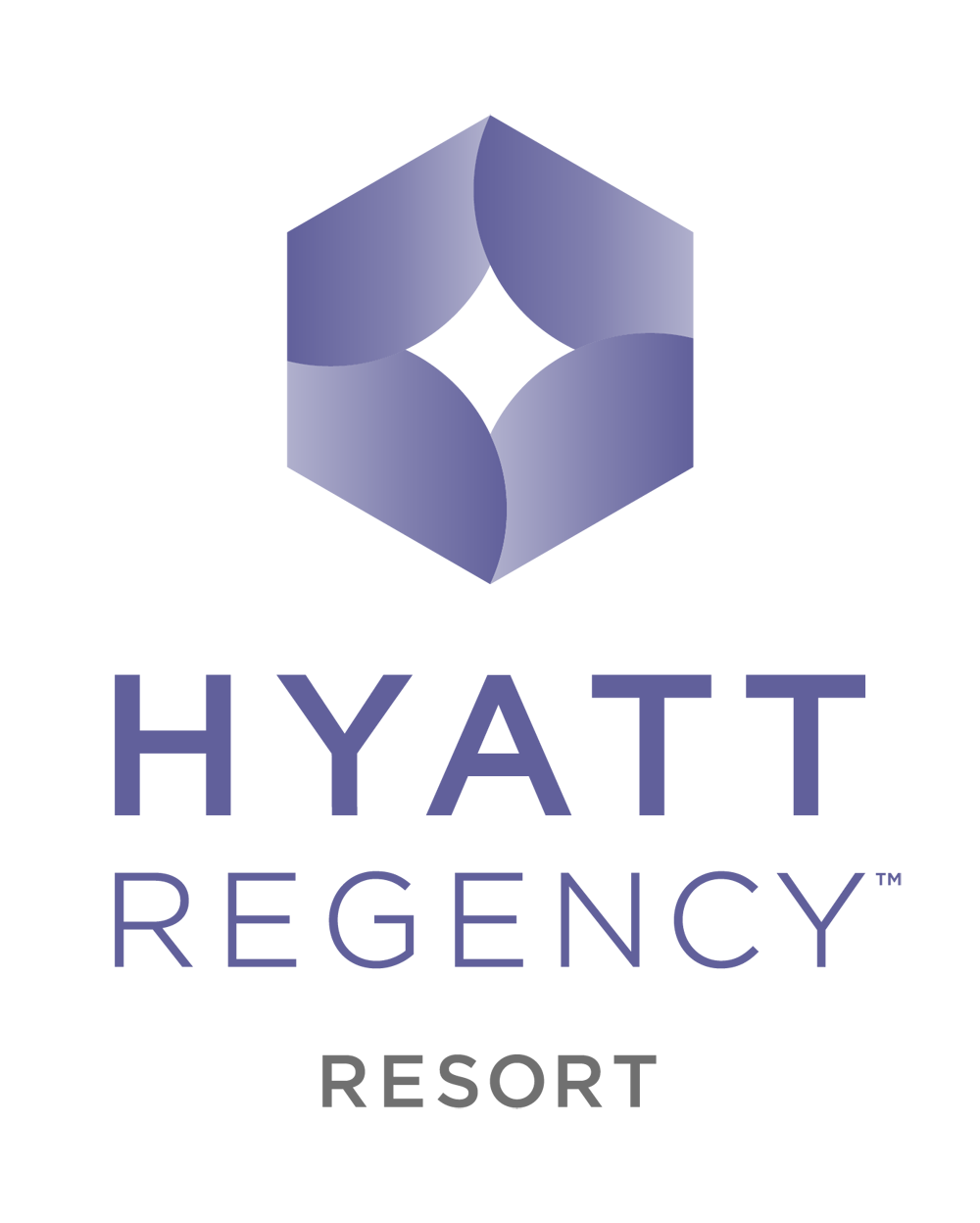
- Founded: 1967
- Founder: Jay Pritzker
- Area served: Worldwide; Asia, North America, Africa, Europe, Australia, South America
- Parent: Hyatt Hotels Corporation
- Website: www.hyatt.com/hyatt-regency

Hyatt Regency is a brand of hotels under the Hyatt banner. The brand contains 211 locations in 189 cities over 40 countries, and is one of the company's 37 hotel brands overall. It tends to cater to business travelers, and several locations have direct skywalk access to convention centers.

== Locations ==
Locations include:

=== Africa ===
==== Morocco ====
- Hyatt Regency Casablanca
- Park Hyatt Marrakech
- Hyatt Place Taghazout Bay

Ethiopia

- Hyatt Regency Addis Ababa

Tanzania

- Hyatt Regency Dar es Salaam, The Kilimanjaro
- Park Hyatt Zanzibar

Kenya

- Hyatt Regency Nairobi Westlands

South Africa

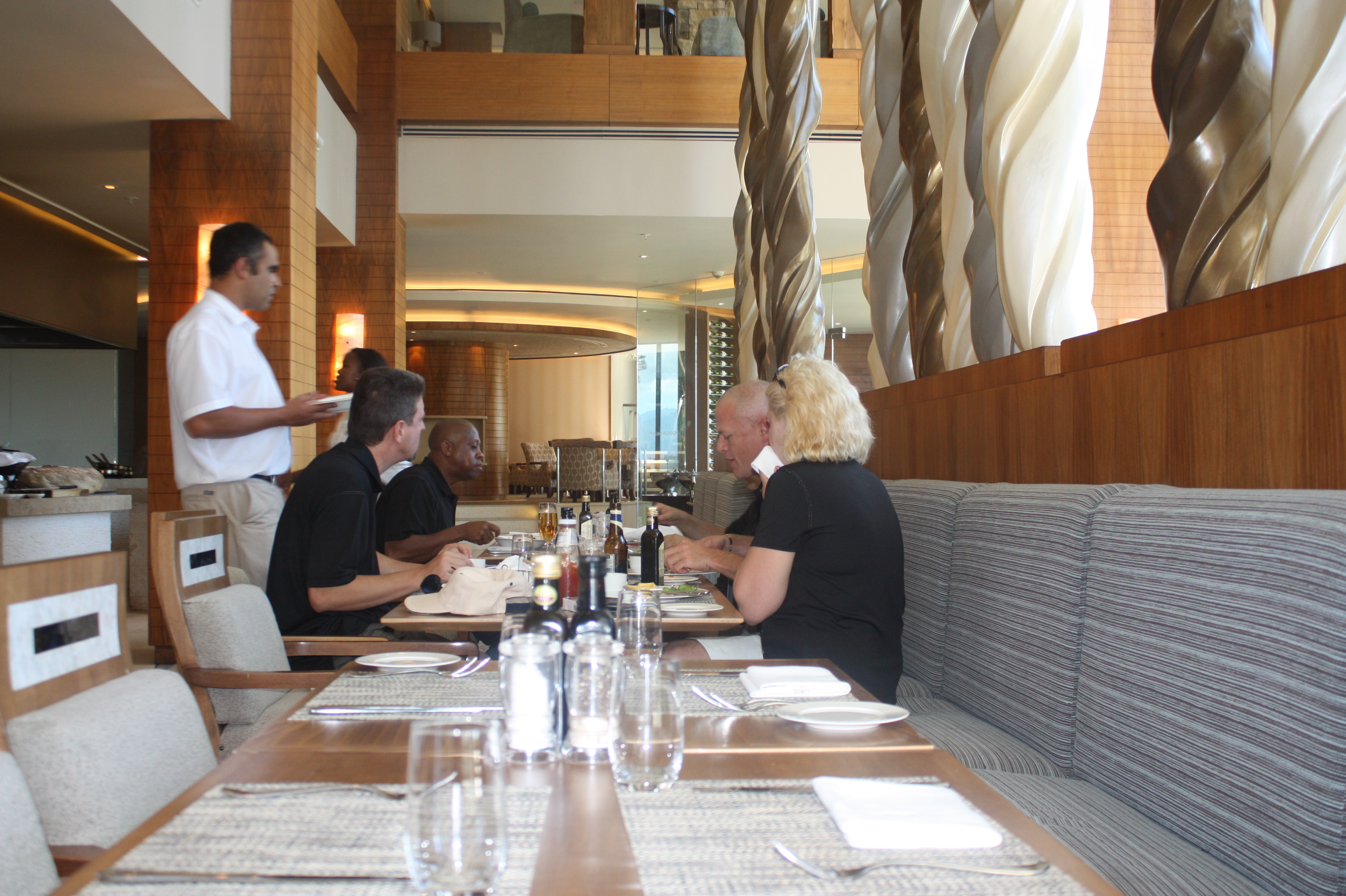
Hyatt Obaai, South Africa

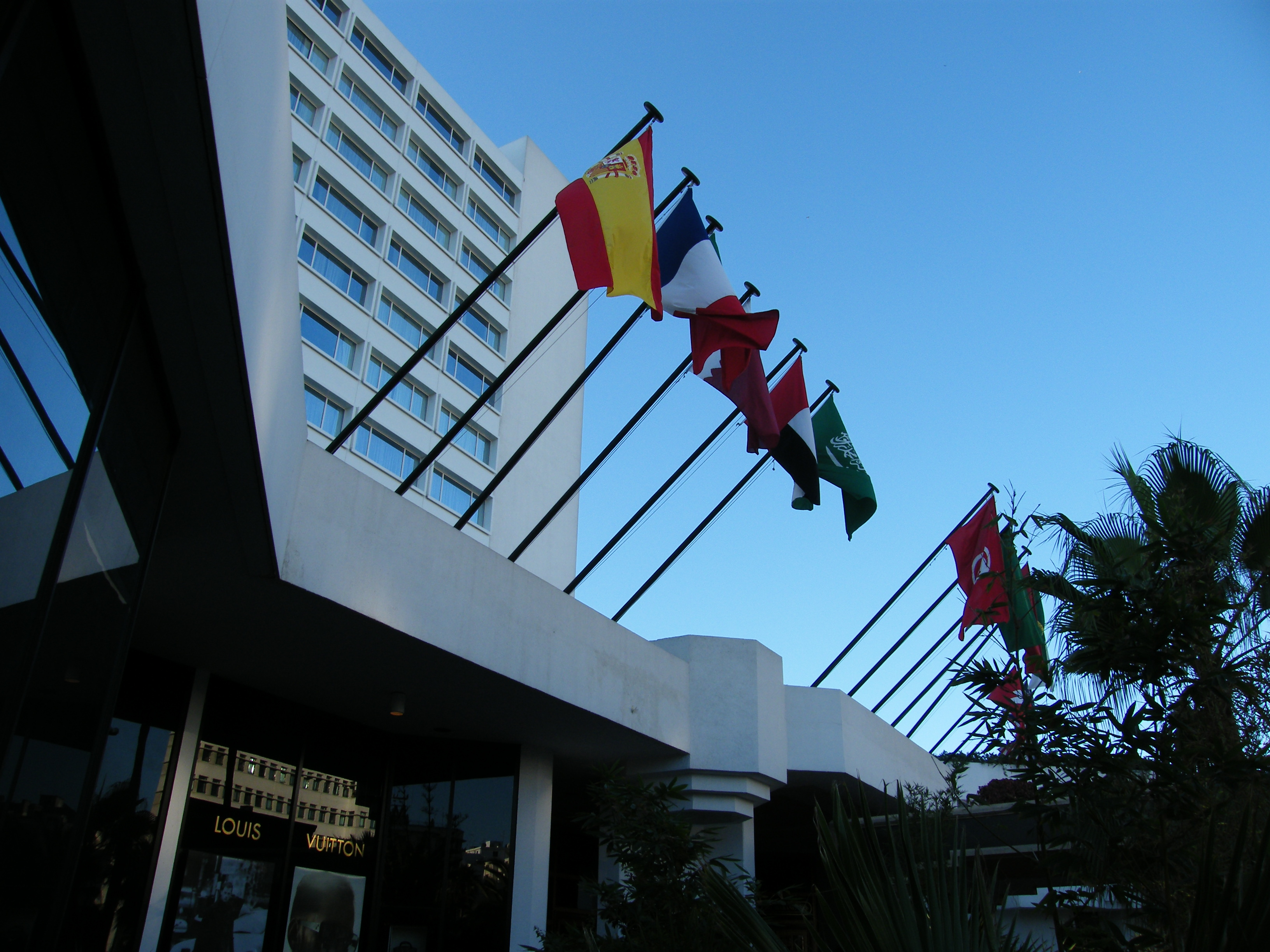
Hyatt Regency Casablanca, Morocco

- Hyatt House Johannesburg Rosebank
- Hyatt Regency Cape Town
- Hyatt House Johannesburg Sandton

Egypt

- Hyatt Regency Cairo West

Algeria

- Hyatt Regency Algiers Airport

Zimbabwe

- Hyatt Regency Harare, The Meikles

=== Asia ===
Azerbaijan

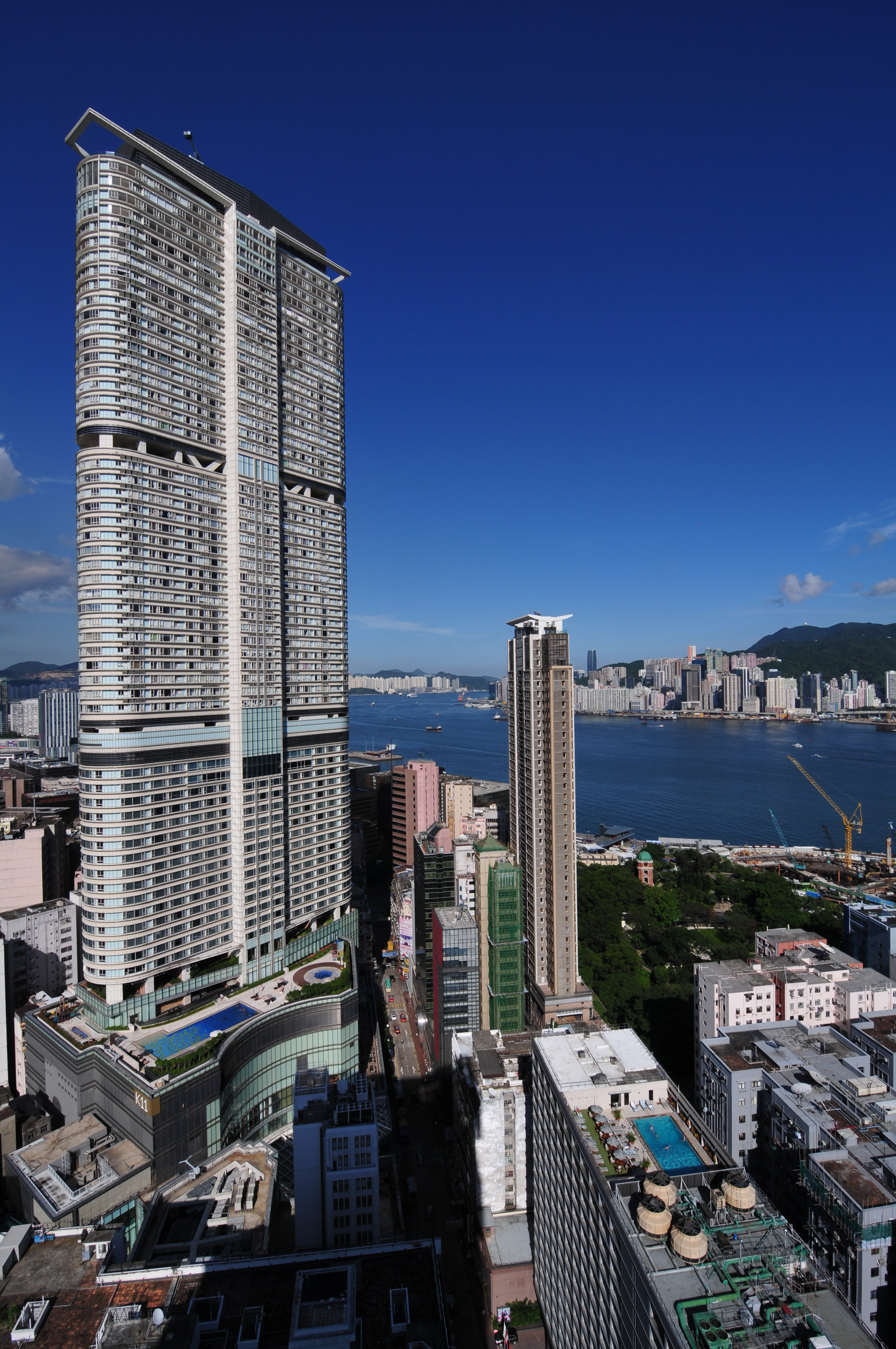
Hyatt Regency Hong Kong, Tsim Sha Tsui

- Hyatt Regency Baku

Cambodia

- Hyatt Regency Phnom Penh

Guam

- Hyatt Regency Guam

Hong Kong

- Hyatt Regency Hong Kong, Tsim Sha Tsui
- Hyatt Regency Hong Kong, Sha Tin

India

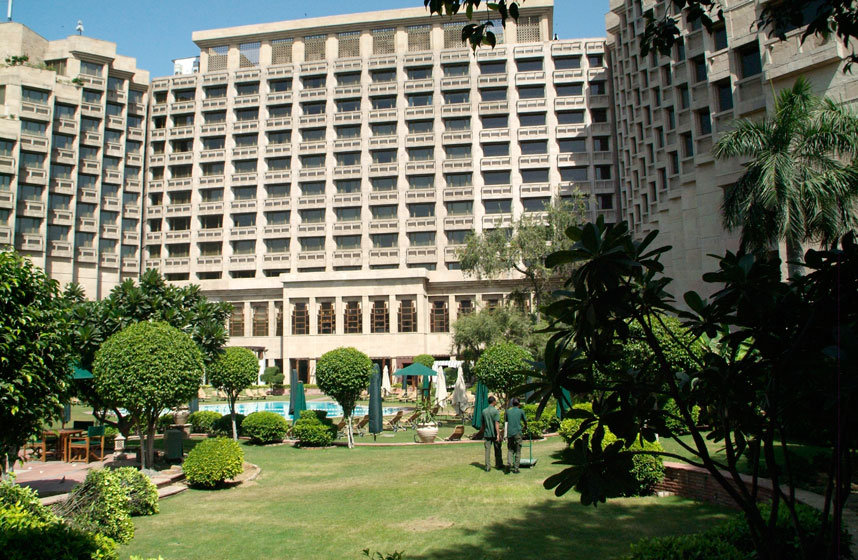
Hyatt Regency Delhi, India

- Hyatt Regency Chandigarh
- Hyatt Regency Delhi
- Hyatt Regency Ahmedabad
- Hyatt Regency Gurgaon
- Hyatt Regency Dharamshala Resort
- Hyatt Regency Thrissur
- Hyatt Regency Trivandrum
- Hyatt Regency Pune & Residences
- Hyatt Regency Amritsar
- Hyatt Regency Ludhiana
- Hyatt Regency Jaipur Mansarovar
- Hyatt Regency Chennai
- Hyatt Regency Lucknow
- Hyatt Regency Dehradun Resort and Spa
- Hyatt Regency Kolkata

Indonesia

- Hyatt Regency Bali
- Hyatt Regency Yogyakarta

Japan

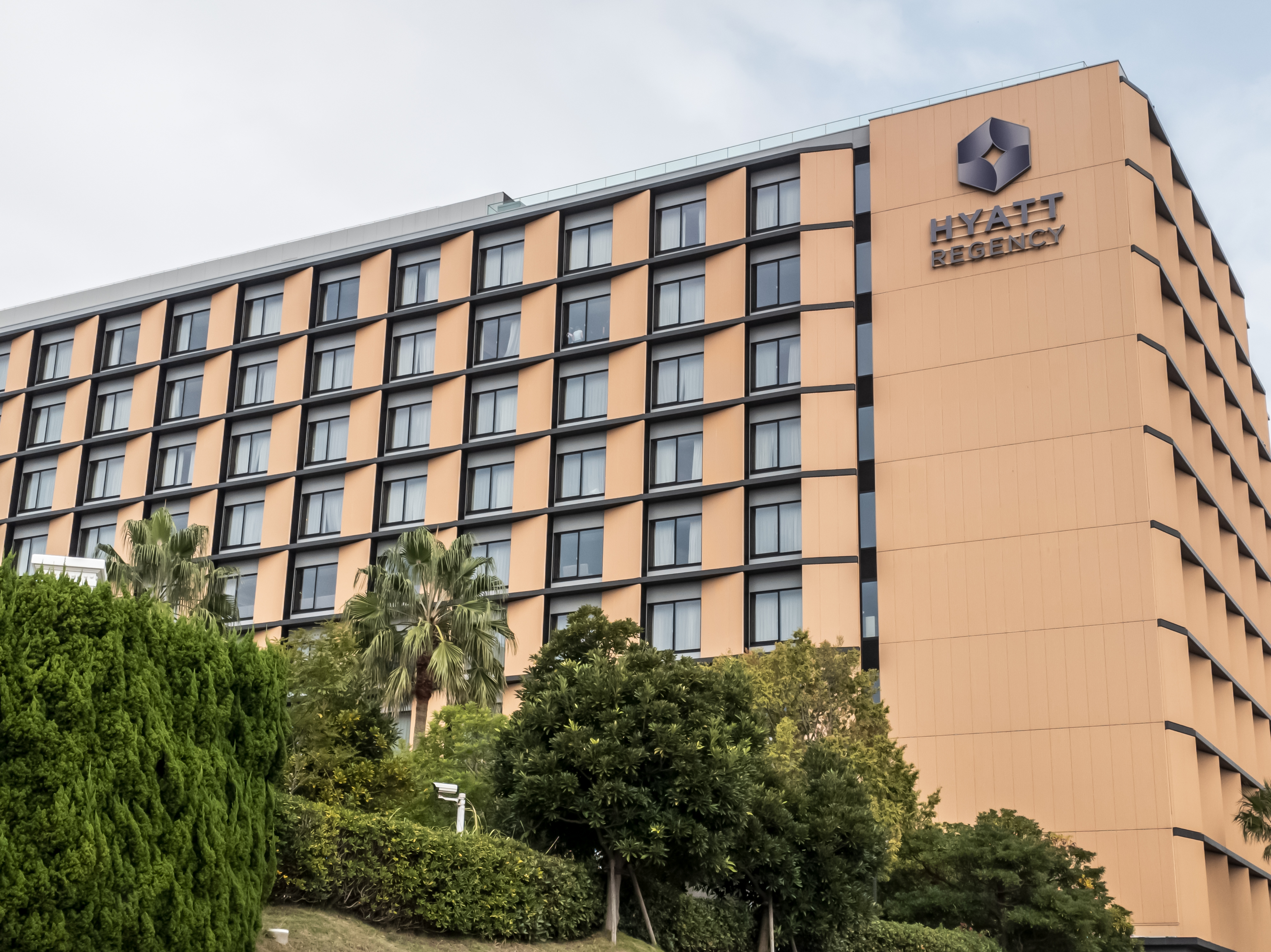
Hyatt Regency Tokyo Bay, Japan

- Hyatt Regency Hakone Resort and Spa
- Hyatt Regency Kyoto
- Hyatt Regency Naha, Okinawa
- Hyatt Regency Seragaki Island, Okinawa
- Hyatt Regency Tokyo
- Hyatt Regency Tokyo Bay
- Hyatt Regency Yokohama

Mainland China

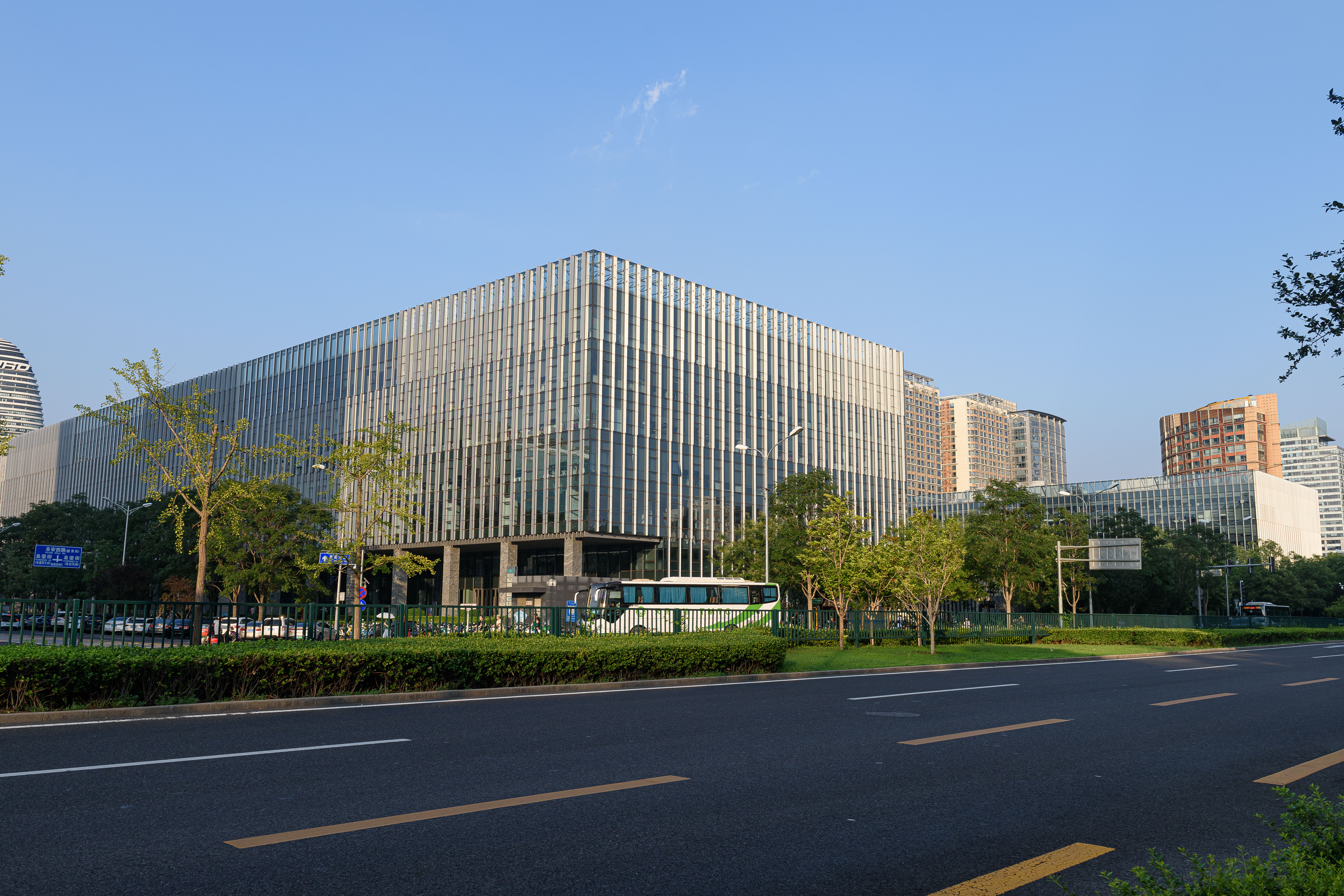
Hyatt Regency Beijing Wangjing, China

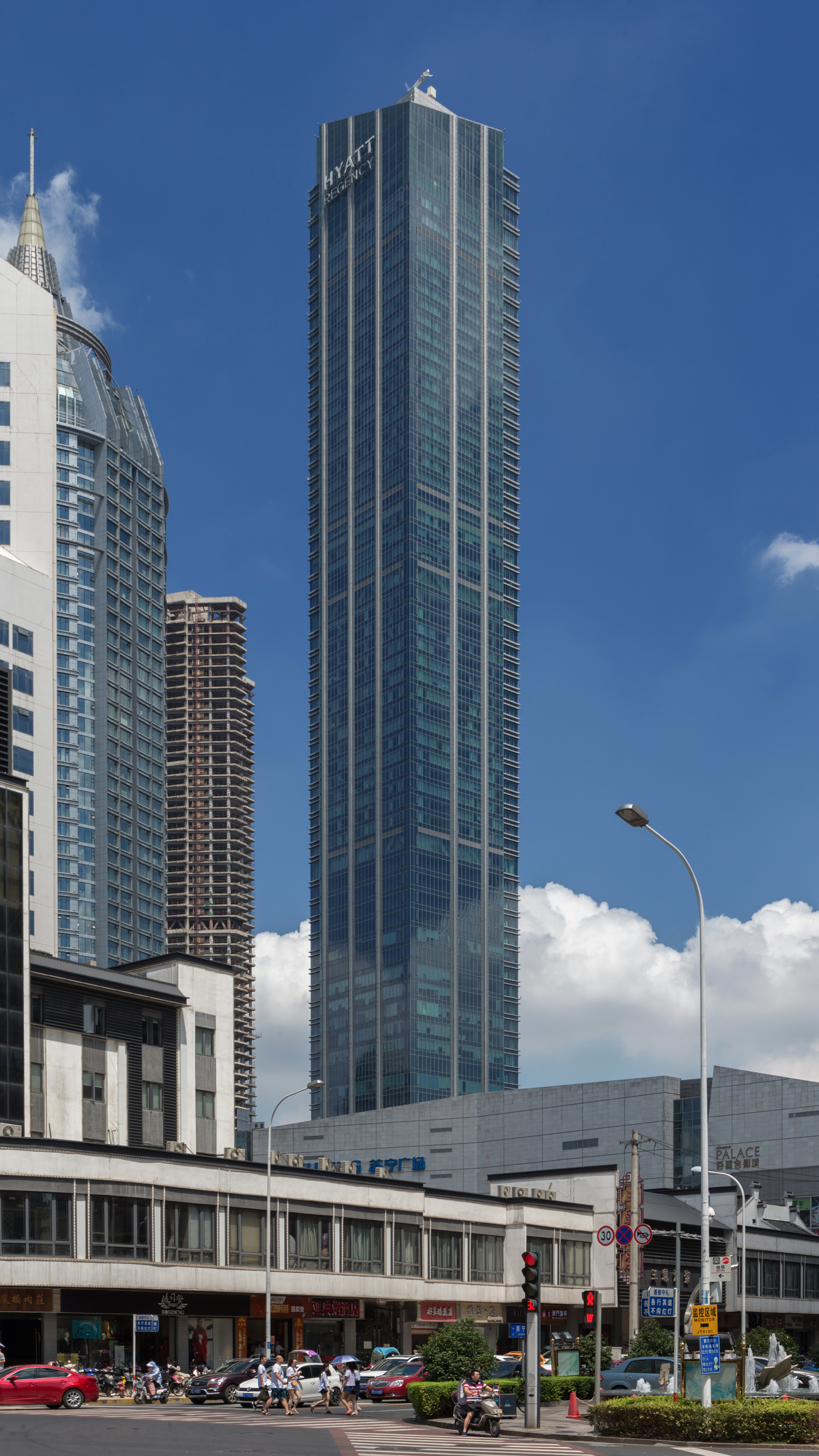
Hyatt Regency Wuxi, China

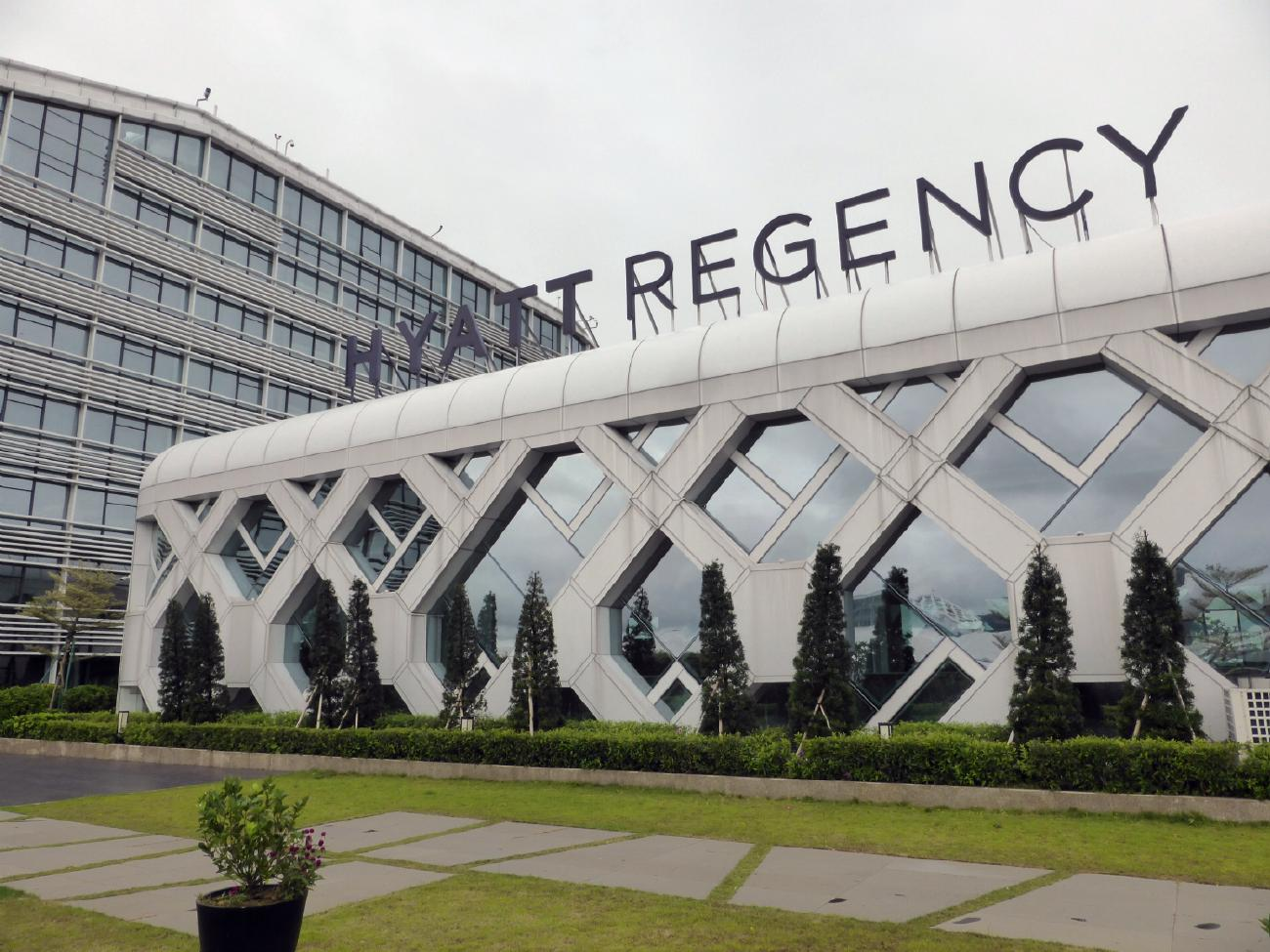
Hyatt Regency Shenzhen Airport, China

- Hyatt Regency Beijing Shiyuan
- Hyatt Regency Beijing Wangjing
- Hyatt Regency Changbaishan
- Hyatt Regency Changchun
- Hyatt Regency Changshu Kuncheng Lake
- Hyatt Regency Chongming
- Hyatt Regency Dongguan
- Hyatt Regency Fuzhou Cangshan
- Hyatt Regency Guangzhou Zengcheng
- Hyatt Regency Guiyang
- Hyatt Regency Hainan Ocean Paradise Resort
- Hyatt Regency Hangzhou International Airport
- Hyatt Regency Hengqin
- Hyatt Regency Huangshan Hengjiangwan
- Hyatt Regency Jinan
- Hyatt Regency Lanzhou
- Hyatt Regency Metropolitan Chongqing
- Hyatt Regency Ningbo Hangzhou Bay
- Hyatt Regency Qingdao
- Hyatt Regency Sanya Tianli Bay
- Hyatt Regency Shanghai Global Harbor
- Hyatt Regency Shanghai Jiading
- Hyatt Regency Shanghai Songjiang
- Hyatt Regency Shanghai, Wujiaochang
- Hyatt Regency Shenzhen Airport
- Hyatt Regency Shenzhen Yantian
- Hyatt Regency Suzhou
- Hyatt Regency Tianjin East
- Hyatt Regency Wuhan Optics Valley
- Hyatt Regency Wuxi
- Hyatt Regency Xi'an
- Hyatt Regency Xiamen Wuyuanwan
- Hyatt Regency Xuzhou
- Hyatt Regency Zhenjiang

Kyrgyzstan

- Hyatt Regency Bishkek

Malaysia

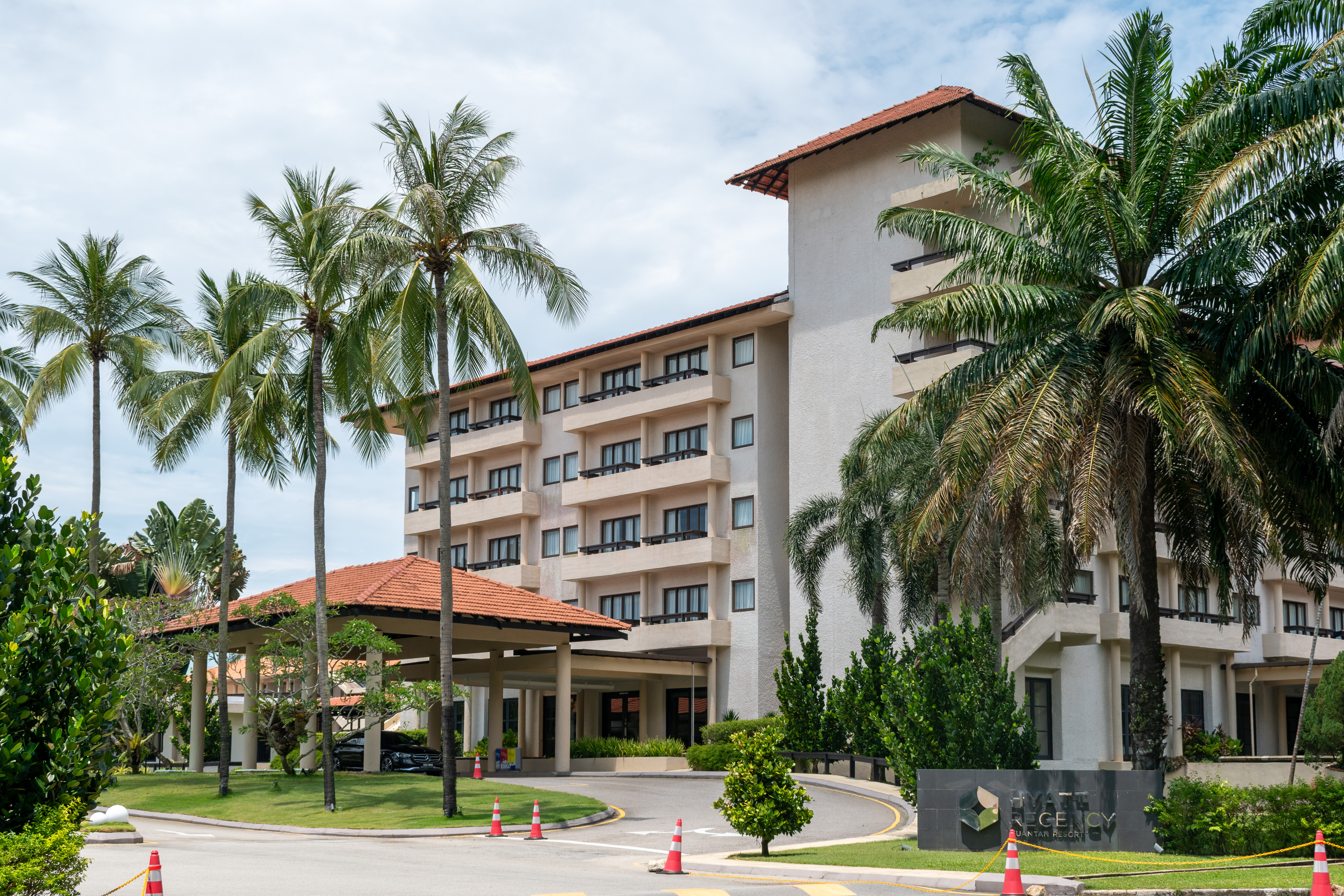
Hyatt Regency Kuantan Resort, Malaysia

- Hyatt Regency Kinabalu
- Hyatt Regency Kuantan Resort

Nepal

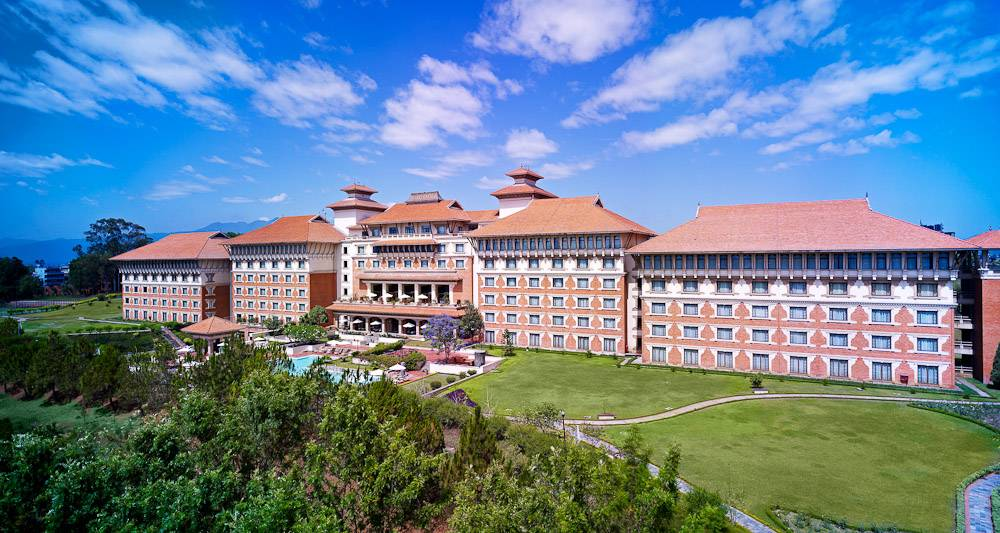
Hyatt Regency Kathmandu, Nepal

- Hyatt Regency Kathmandu

Philippines

- Midas Hotel and Casino, formerly the Hyatt Regency Manila in Pasay, Philippines
- New Coast Hotel Manila, formerly the Hyatt Regency Hotel & Casino Manila, Philippines
- Hyatt Regency Hotel, at the City of Dreams Manila in Parañaque, Philippines

Tajikistan

- Hyatt Regency Dushanbe

Thailand

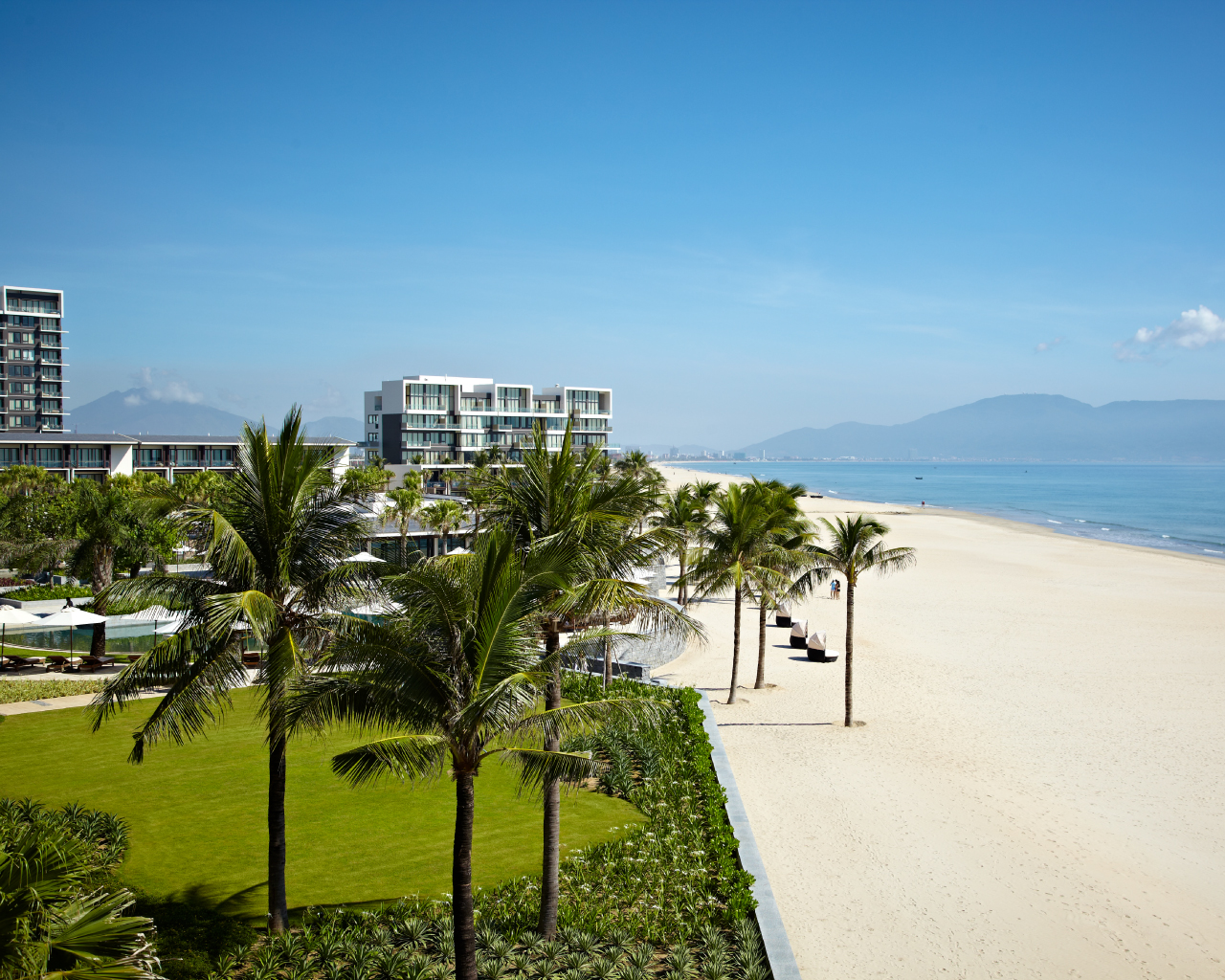
Hyatt Regency Danang Resort and Spa, Vietnam

- Hyatt Regency Bangkok Sukhumvit
- Hyatt Regency Bangkok Suvarnabhumi Airport
- Hyatt Regency Phuket Resort
- Hyatt Regency Hua Hin
- Hyatt Regency Koh Samui

Uzbekistan

- Hyatt Regency Tashkent

Vietnam

- Hyatt Regency Danang Resort and Spa
- Hyatt Regency Nha Trang

Taiwan

- Hyatt Regency Taoyuan International Airport

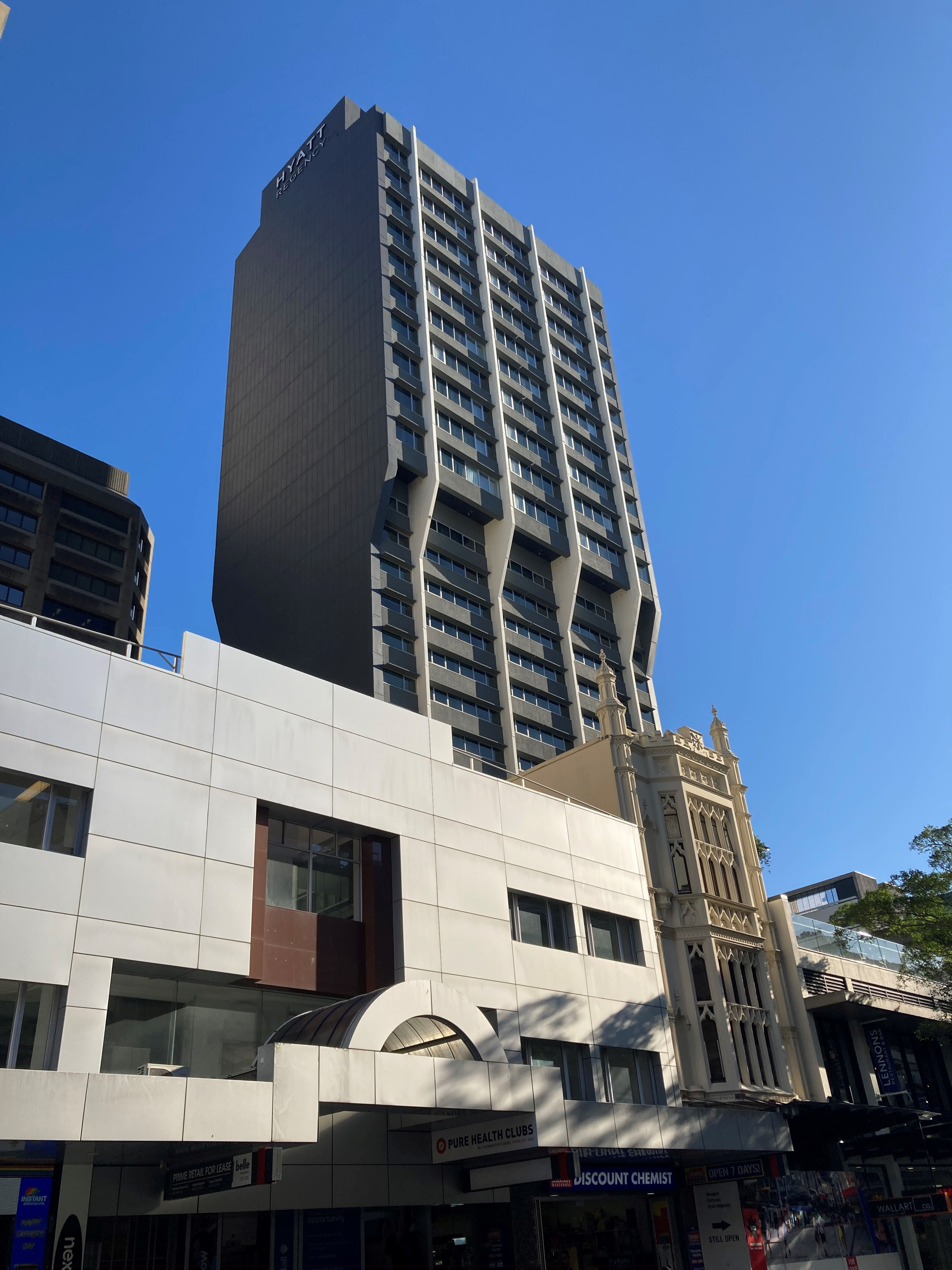
Hyatt Regency Brisbane, Australia

Middle East Jordan

- Hyatt Regency Aqaba Ayla

Kuwait

- Hyatt Regency Al Kout Mall

Qatar

- Hyatt Regency Oryx Doha

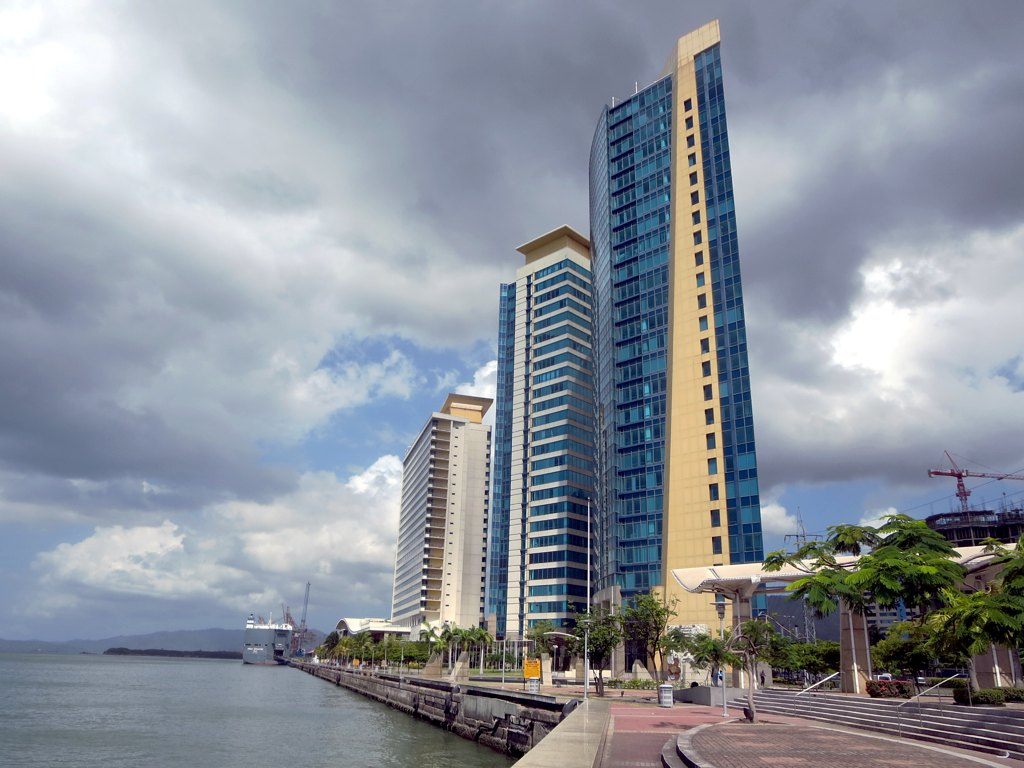
Hyatt Regency Trinidad and Tobago

==== Saudi Arabia ====
- Hyatt Regency Riyadh Olaya
- Jabal Omar Hyatt Regency Makkah

==== United Arab Emirates ====
- Hyatt Regency Dubai
- Hyatt Regency Dubai Creek Heights

=== Australia & Pacific ===
==== Australia ====
- Hyatt Regency Sydney
- Hyatt Regency Brisbane

=== Europe ===
Bulgaria

- Hyatt Regency Pravets Resort
- Hyatt Regency Sofia

Croatia

- Hyatt Regency Zadar

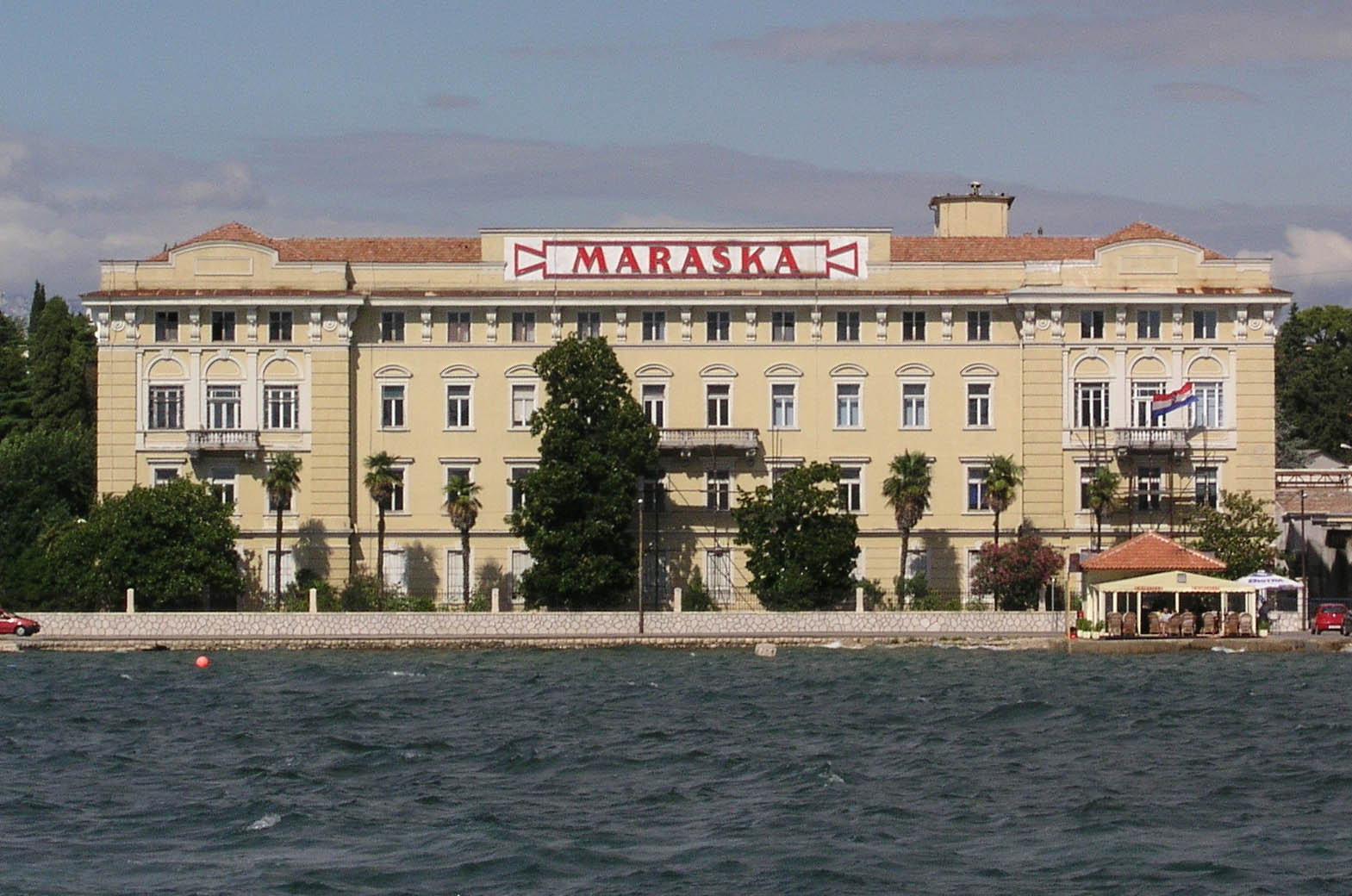
Hyatt Regency Zadar, Croatia

France

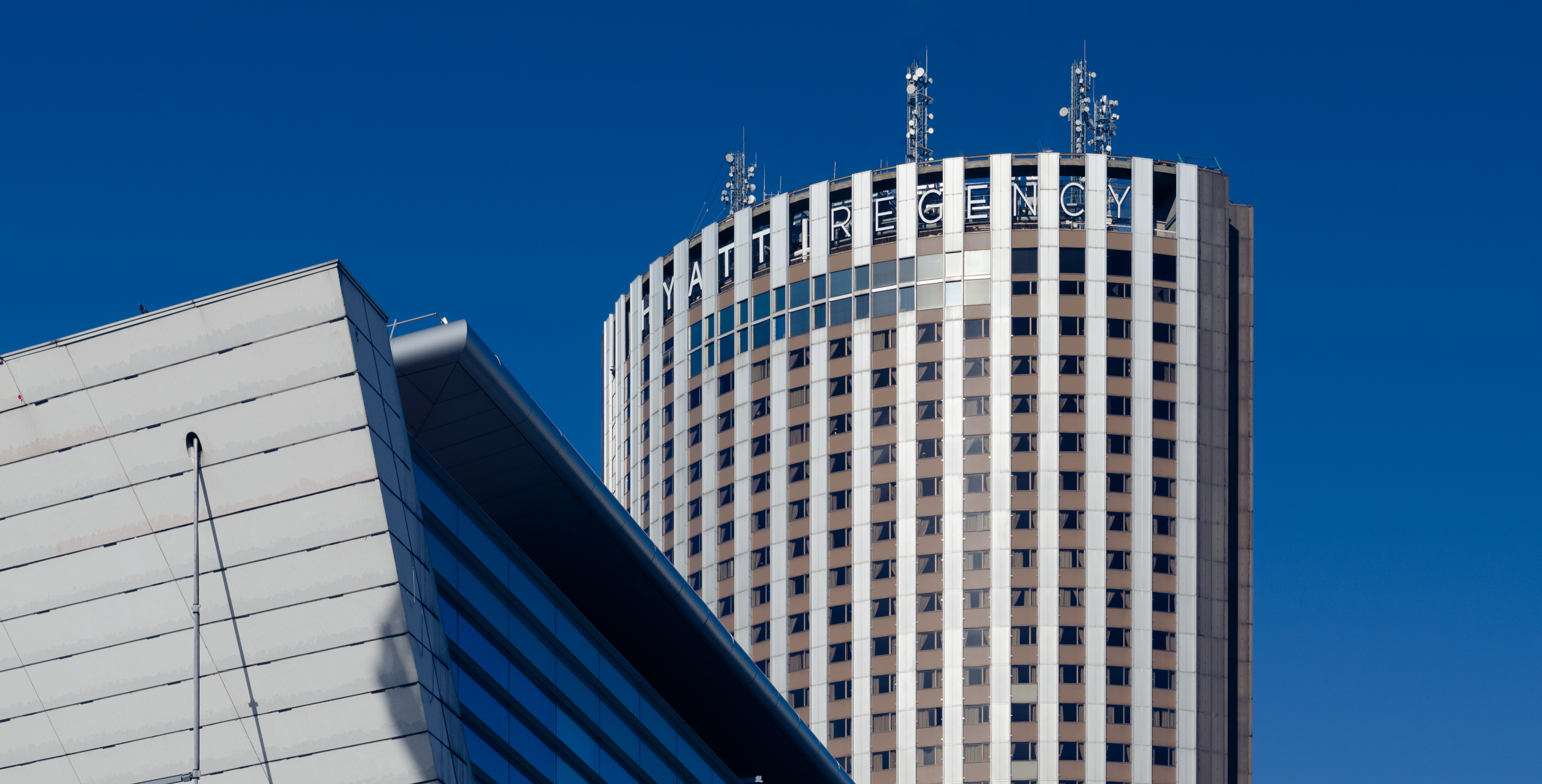
Hyatt Regency Paris Étoile, France

- Hyatt Regency Paris Étoile
- Hyatt Regency Nice Palais de la Méditerranée

Germany

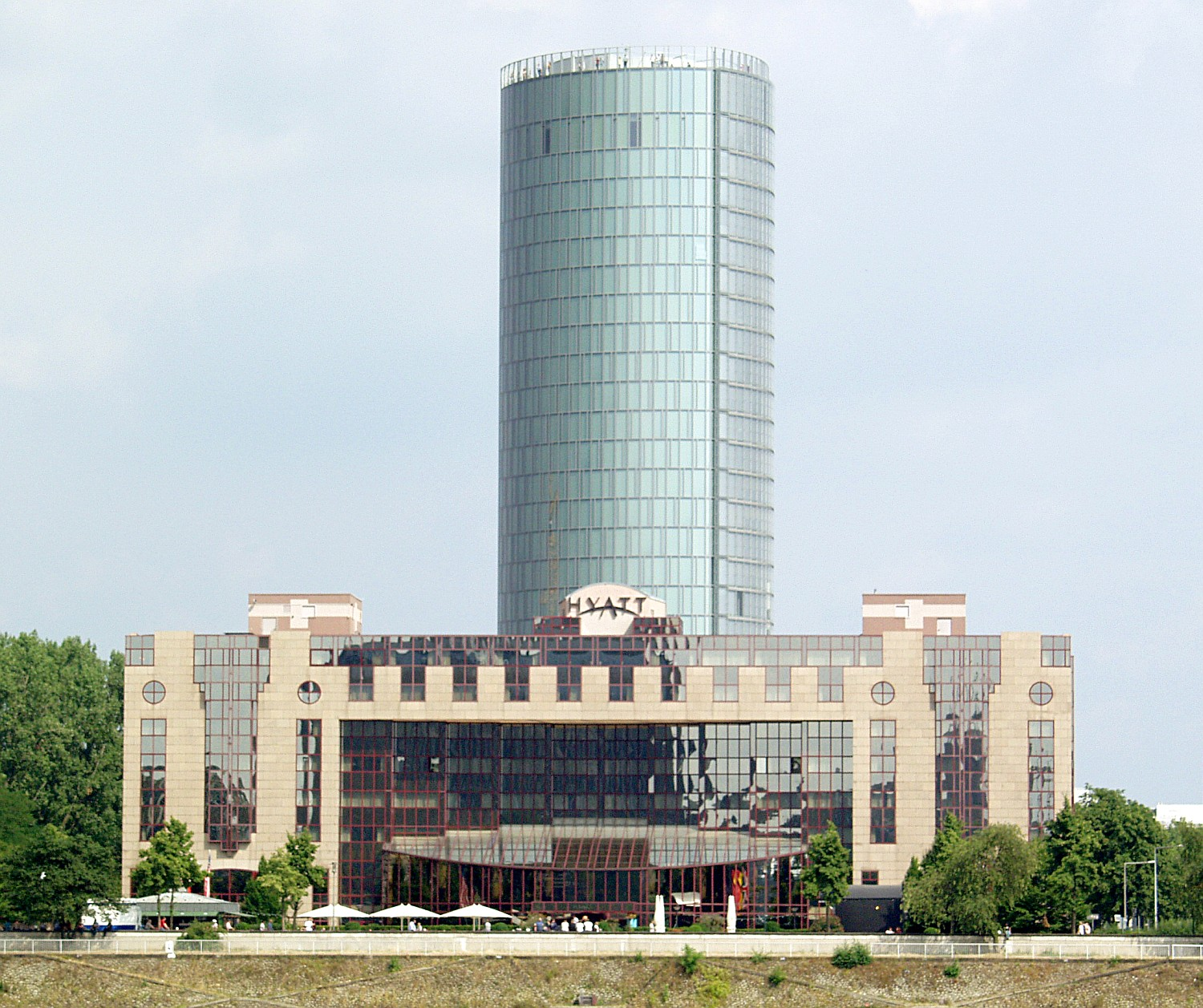
Hyatt Regency Cologne, Germany

- Hyatt Regency Cologne
- Hyatt Regency Dusseldorf
- Hyatt Regency Mainz

Greece

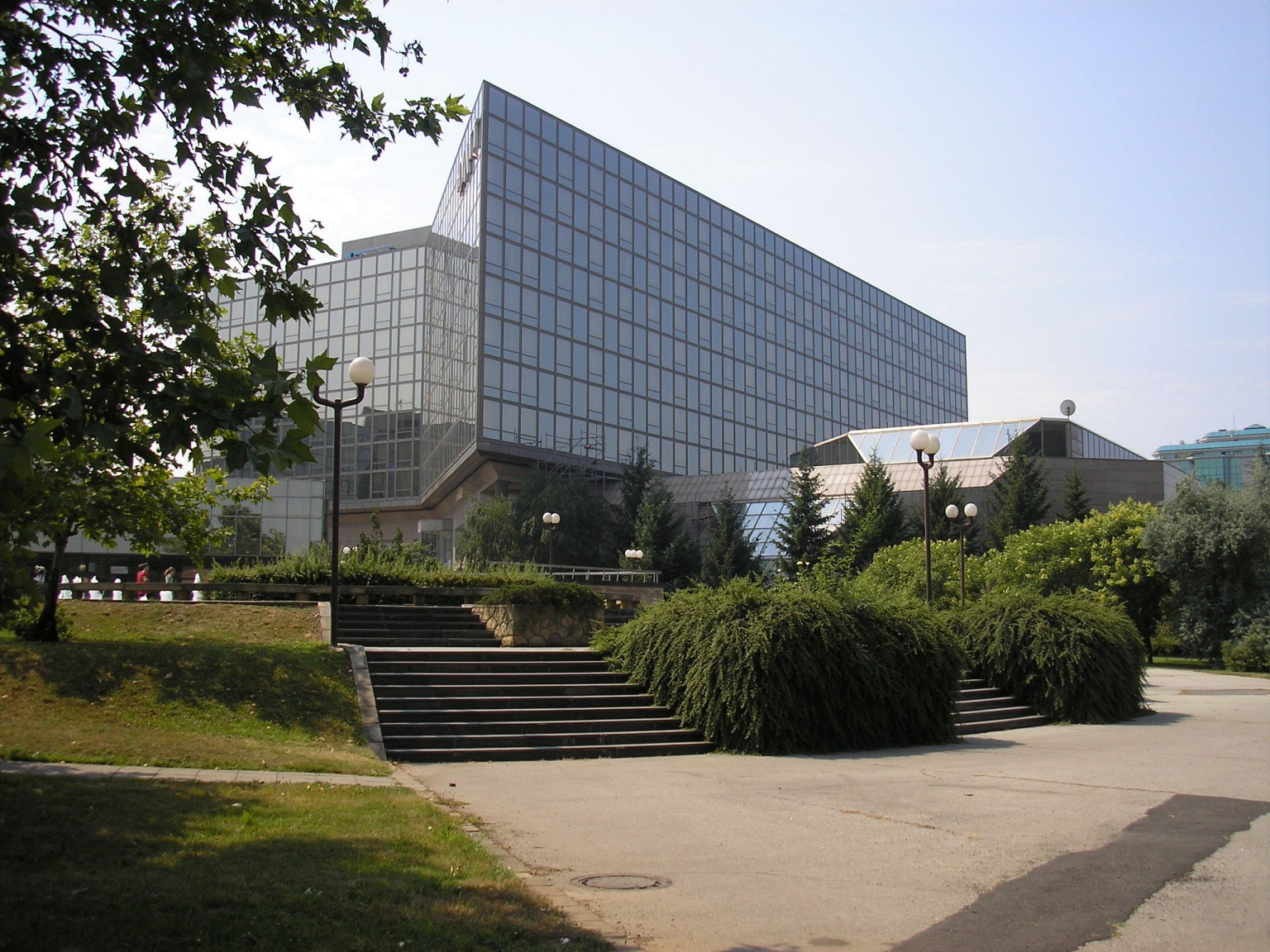
Hyatt Regency Belgrade, Serbia

- Hyatt Regency Thessaloniki

Italy

- Hyatt Regency Rome Central

Malta

- Hyatt Regency Malta

Montenegro

- Hyatt Regency Kotor Bay Resort

Netherlands

- Hyatt Regency Amsterdam

Serbia

- Hyatt Regency Belgrade

Portugal

- Hyatt Regency Lisbon

Spain

- Hyatt Regency Barcelona Tower
- Hyatt Regency Hesperia Madrid
- Hyatt Regency Madrid Residences

Switzerland

- Hyatt Regency Zurich Airport The Circle

Türkiye

- Hyatt Regency Istanbul Ataköy
- Hyatt Regency İzmir İstinyePark

Ukraine

- Hyatt Regency Kyiv

United Kingdom

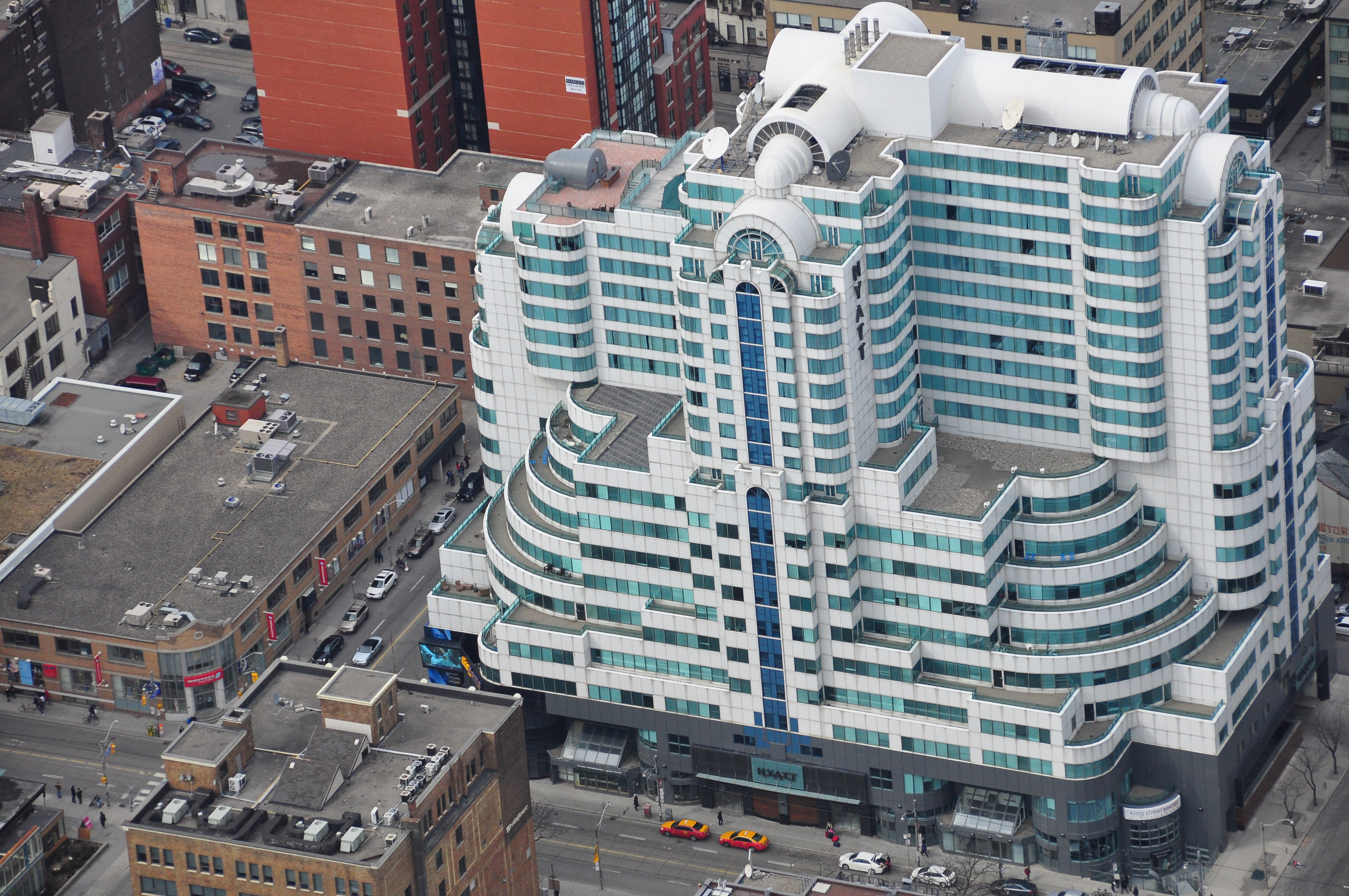
Hyatt Regency Toronto, Canada

- Hyatt Regency Birmingham
- Hyatt Regency London - The Churchill
- Hyatt Regency London Albert Embankment
- Hyatt Regency London Blackfriars
- Hyatt Regency London Stratford
- Hyatt Regency Manchester

=== North America ===
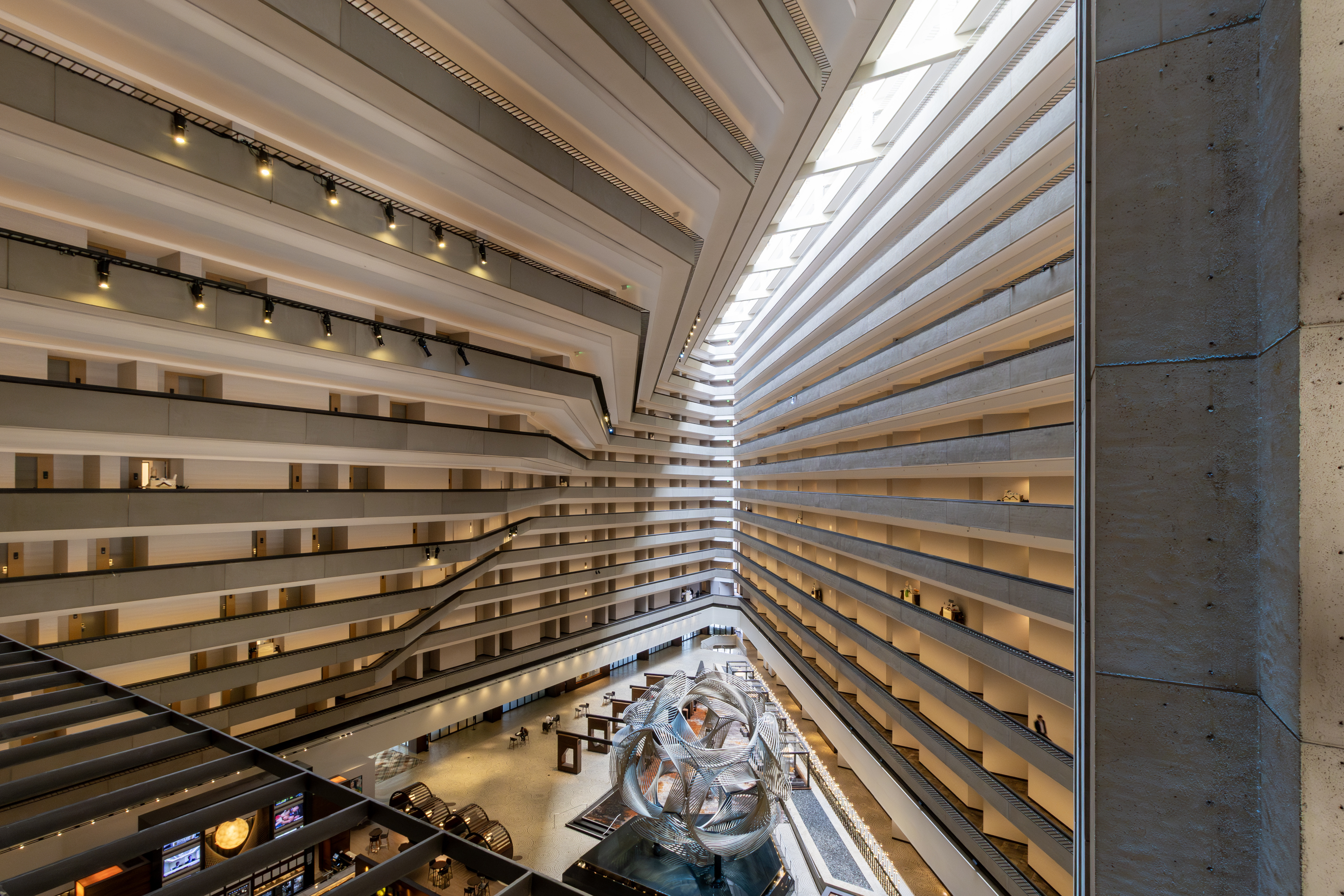
Hotel lobby of Hyatt Regency San Francisco, California

=== Canada ===
- Hyatt Regency Toronto, Ontario
- Hyatt Regency Vancouver, British Columbia
- Hyatt Regency Calgary, Alberta

=== United States ===
Alabama

- Hyatt Regency Birmingham - The Wynfrey Hotel

Arizona

- Hyatt Regency Phoenix

California

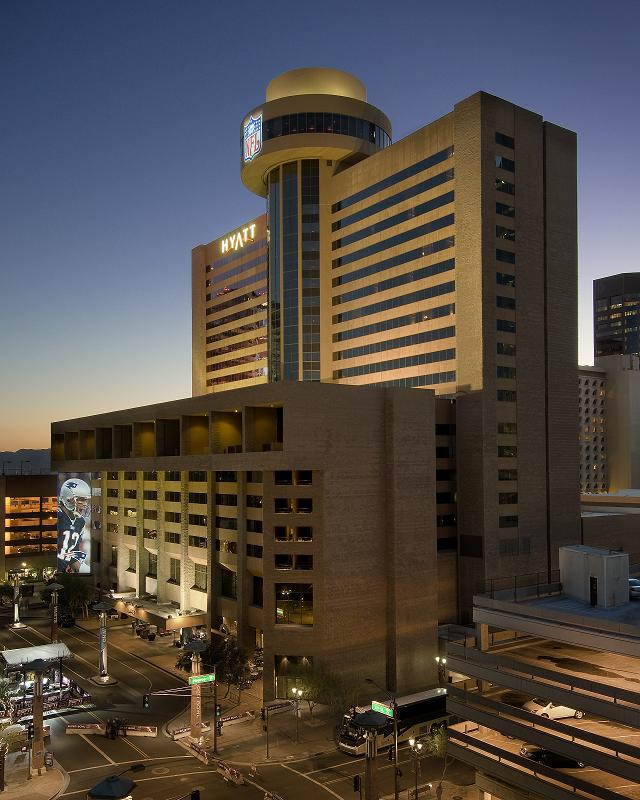
Hyatt Regency Phoenix, Arizona

- Hyatt Regency Huntington Beach Resort and Spa
- Hyatt Regency Irvine
- Hyatt Regency La Jolla at Aventine
- Hyatt Regency Long Beach
- Hyatt Regency Los Angeles International Airport
- Hyatt Regency Mission Bay Spa and Marina
- Hyatt Regency Monterey Hotel and Spa on Del Monte Golf Course
- Hyatt Regency Newport Beach
- Hyatt Regency Newport Beach West
- Hyatt Regency Orange County
- Hyatt Regency Sacramento
- Hyatt Regency San Francisco
- Hyatt Regency San Francisco Airport
- Hyatt Regency San Francisco Downtown SOMA
- Hyatt Regency Santa Clara
- Hyatt Regency Sonoma Wine Country
- Hyatt Regency Valencia
- Hyatt Regency Westlake

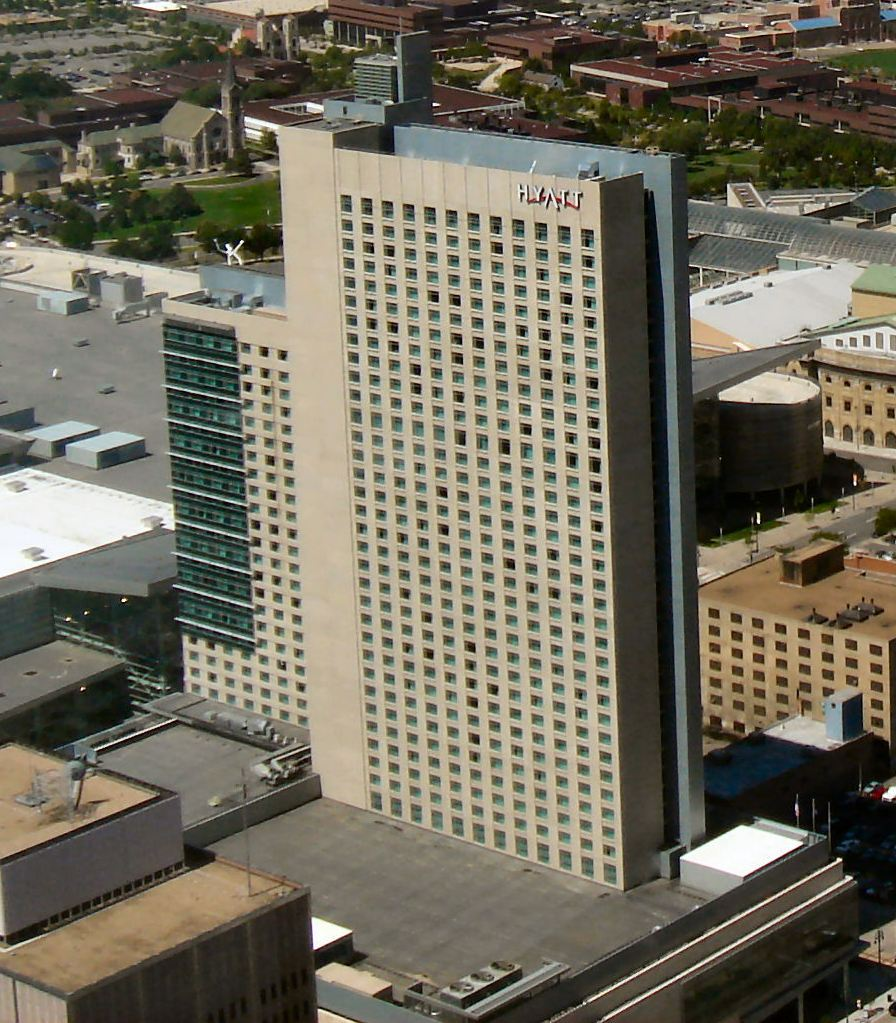
Hyatt Regency Denver at Colorado Convention Center, Colorado

Colorado

- Hyatt Regency Aurora-Denver Conference Center
- Hyatt Regency Denver at Colorado Convention Center
- Hyatt Regency Denver Tech Center

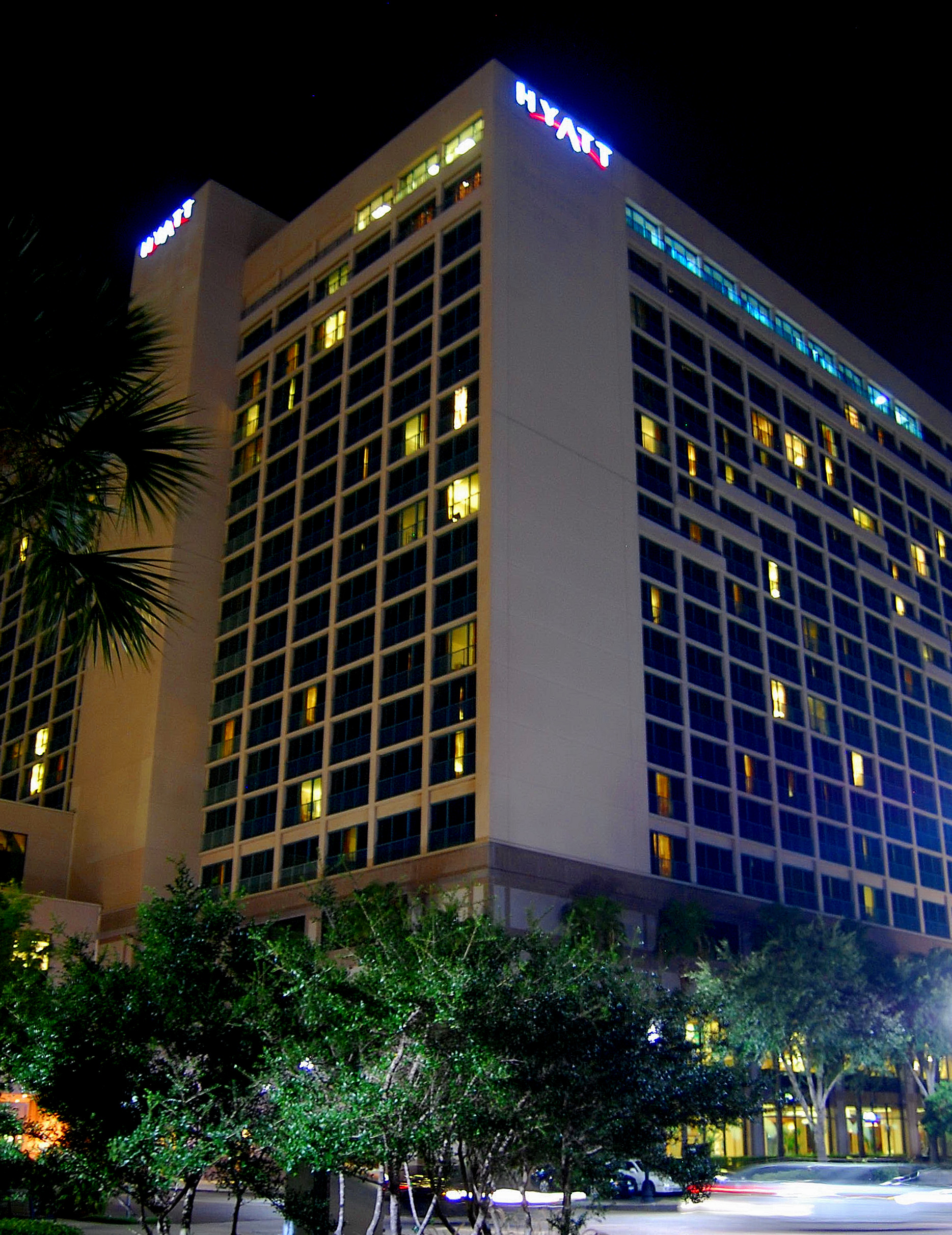
Hyatt Regency Jacksonville Riverfront, Florida

Connecticut

- Hyatt Regency Greenwich

D.C.

- Hyatt Regency Washington on Capitol Hill

Florida

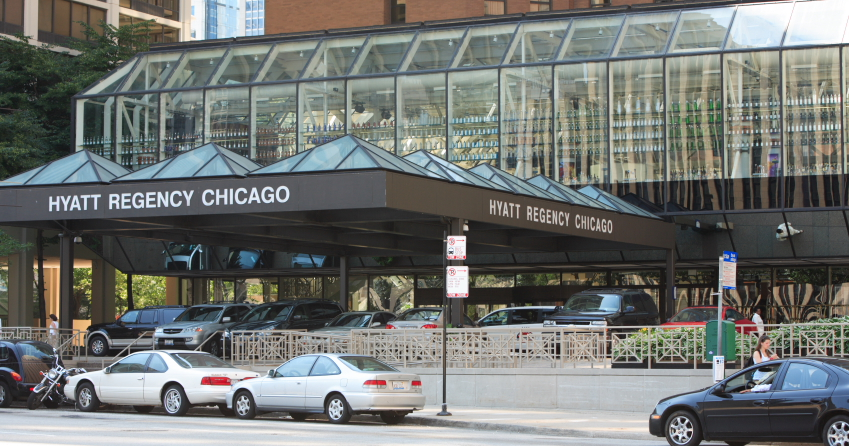
Hyatt Regency Chicago, Illinois

- Hyatt Regency Clearwater Beach Resort and Spa
- Hyatt Regency Coconut Point Resort and Spa
- Hyatt Regency Coral Gables
- Hyatt Regency Grand Cypress Resort
- Hyatt Regency Jacksonville Riverfront
- Hyatt Regency Miami
- Hyatt Regency Orlando
- Hyatt Regency Orlando International Airport
- Hyatt Regency Sarasota

Georgia

- Hyatt Regency Atlanta
- Hyatt Regency Atlanta Perimeter at Villa Christina
- Hyatt Regency Savannah
- Hyatt Regency Suites Atlanta Northwest

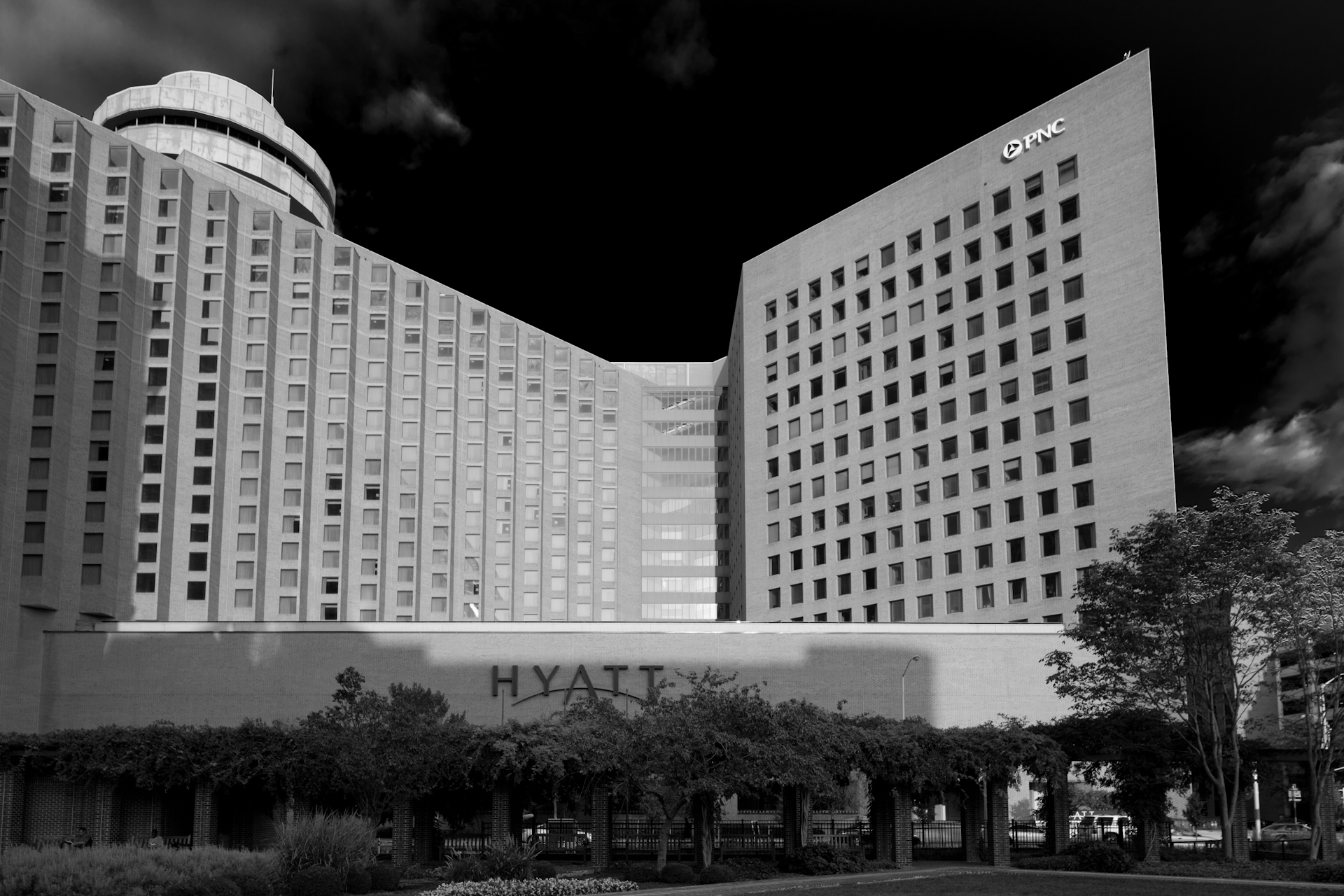
Hyatt Regency Indianapolis, Indiana

Hawaii

- Hyatt Regency Maui Resort and Spa
- Hyatt Regency Waikiki Beach Resort and Spa

Illinois

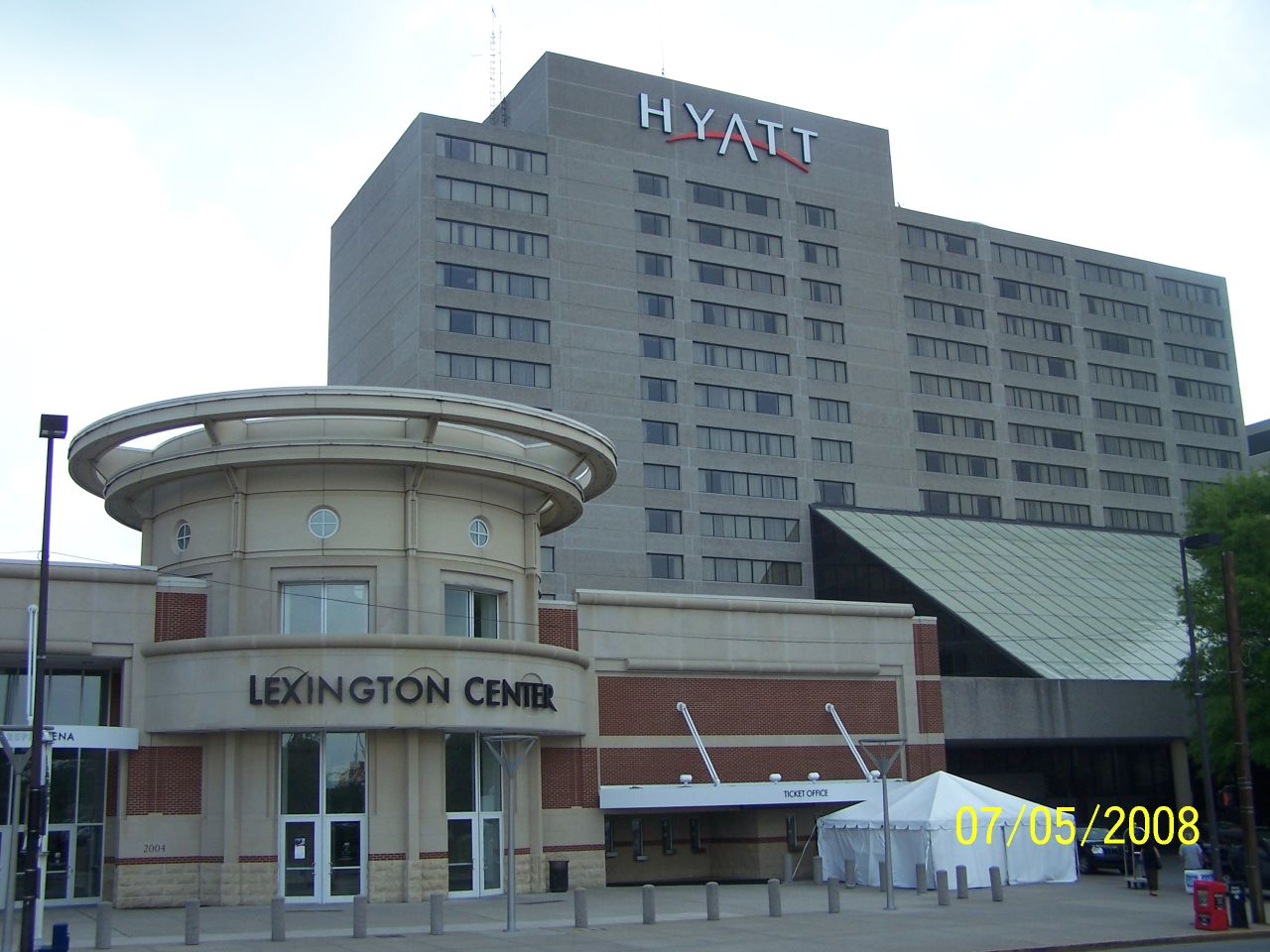
Hyatt Regency Lexington, Kentucky

- Hyatt Regency Chicago
- Hyatt Regency Deerfield
- Hyatt Regency Lisle near Naperville
- Hyatt Regency McCormick Place (in Chicago)
- Hyatt Regency O'Hare Chicago
- Hyatt Regency Schaumburg (near Chicago)

Indiana

- Hyatt Regency Indianapolis

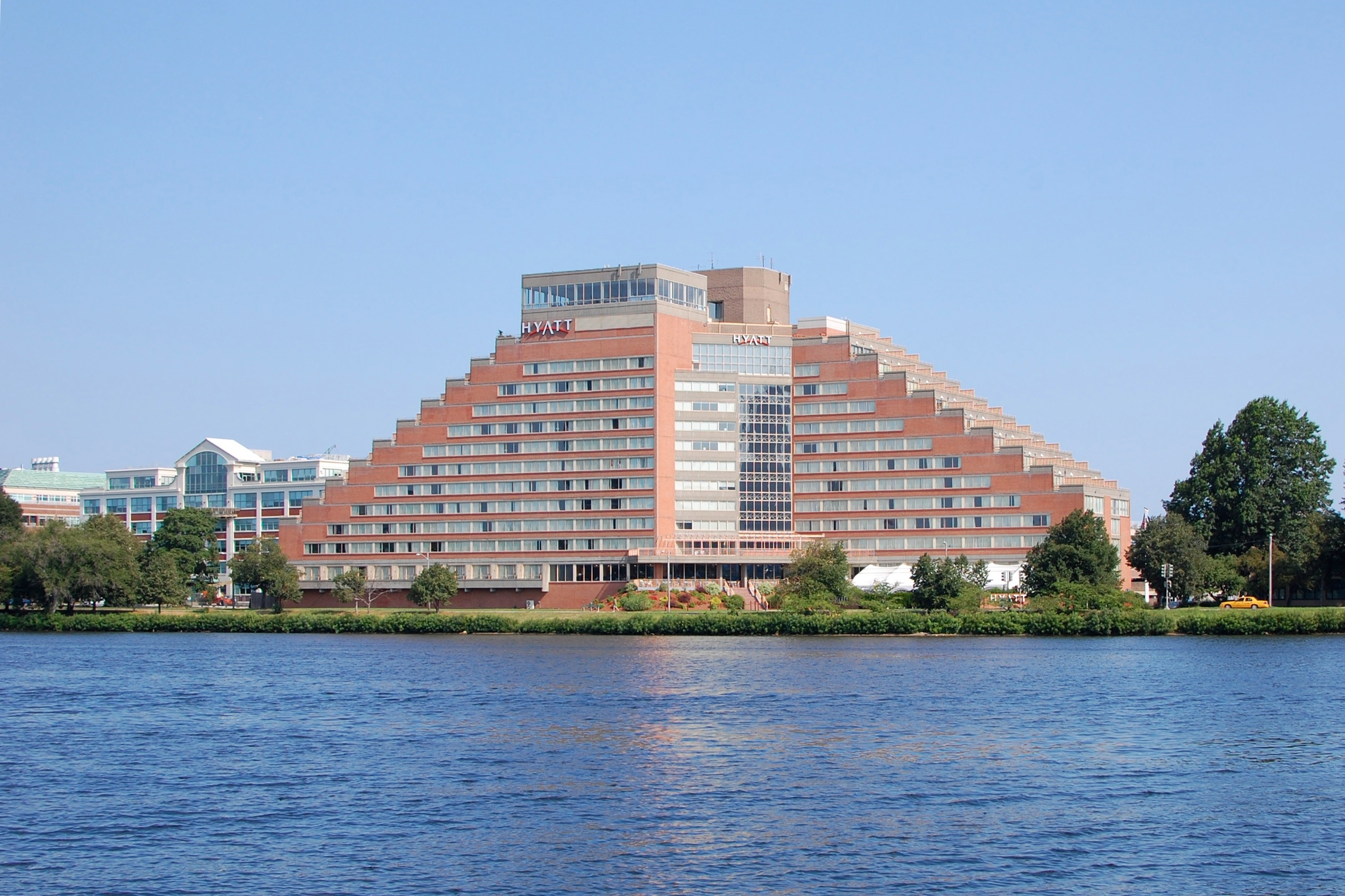
Hyatt Regency Cambridge, Massachusetts

Iowa

- Hyatt Regency Coralville Hotel & Conference Center

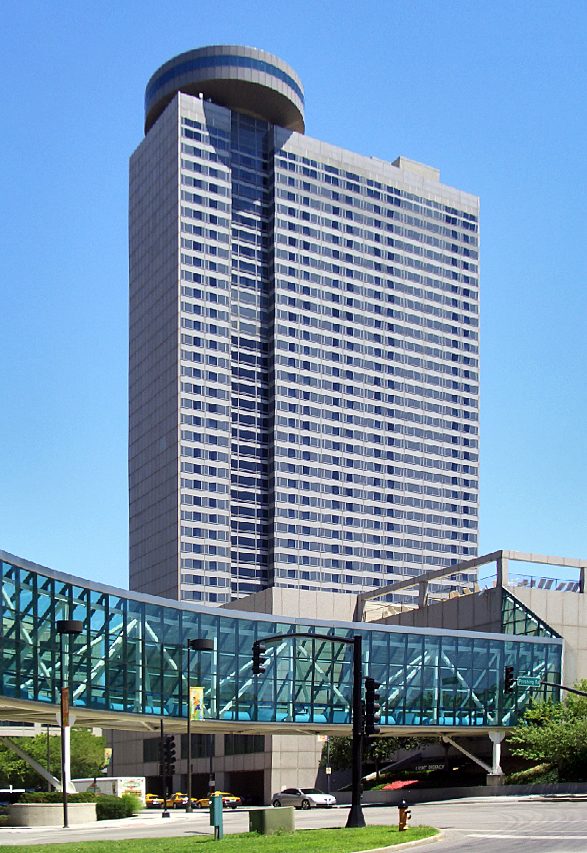
Hyatt Regency Crown Center Kansas City, Missouri

Kansas

- Hyatt Regency Wichita

Kentucky

- Hyatt Regency Lexington
- Hyatt Regency Louisville

Louisiana

- Hyatt Regency New Orleans

Maryland

- Hyatt Regency Baltimore Inner Harbor
- Hyatt Regency Bethesda
- Hyatt Regency Chesapeake Bay Golf Resort, Spa and Marina

Massachusetts

- Hyatt Regency Boston
- Hyatt Regency Boston / Cambridge
- Hyatt Regency Boston Harbor

Minnesota

- Hyatt Regency Bloomington - Minneapolis
- Hyatt Regency Minneapolis

Missouri

- Hyatt Regency St. Louis at The Arch
- Hyatt Regency Crown Center Kansas City

Nevada

- Hyatt Regency Lake Tahoe Resort, Spa and Casino

New Jersey

- Hyatt Regency Jersey City on the Hudson
- Hyatt Regency Morristown
- Hyatt Regency New Brunswick
- Hyatt Regency Princeton

New Mexico

- Hyatt Regency Tamaya Resort and Spa

New York

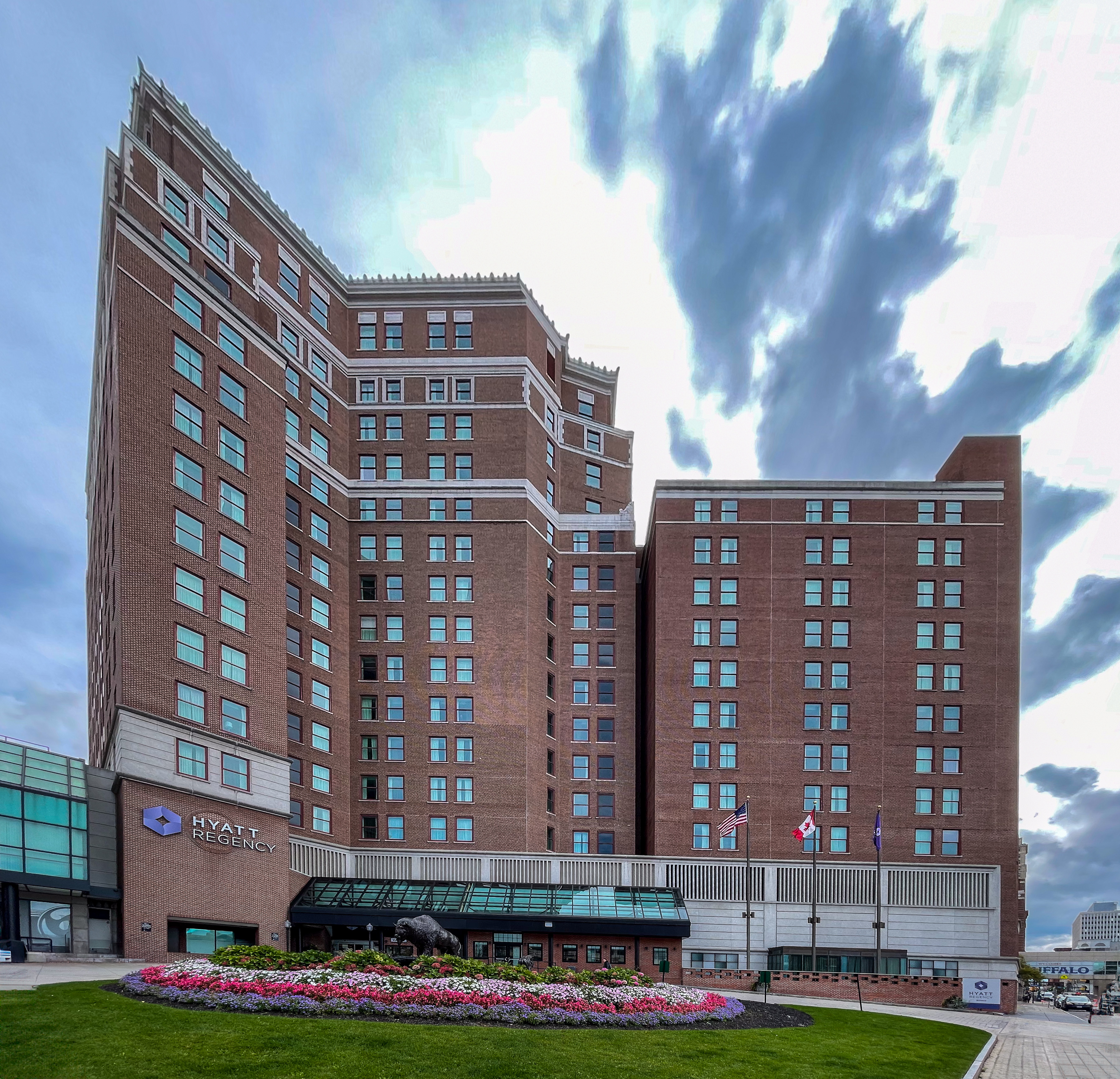
Hyatt Regency in Buffalo, New York

- Hyatt Regency Buffalo / Hotel and Conference Center
- Hyatt Regency JFK Airport at Resorts World New York
- Hyatt Regency Long Island
- Hyatt Regency Rochester
- Hyatt Regency Times Square

Ohio

- Hyatt Regency Cincinnati
- Hyatt Regency Cleveland at The Arcade
- Hyatt Regency Columbus

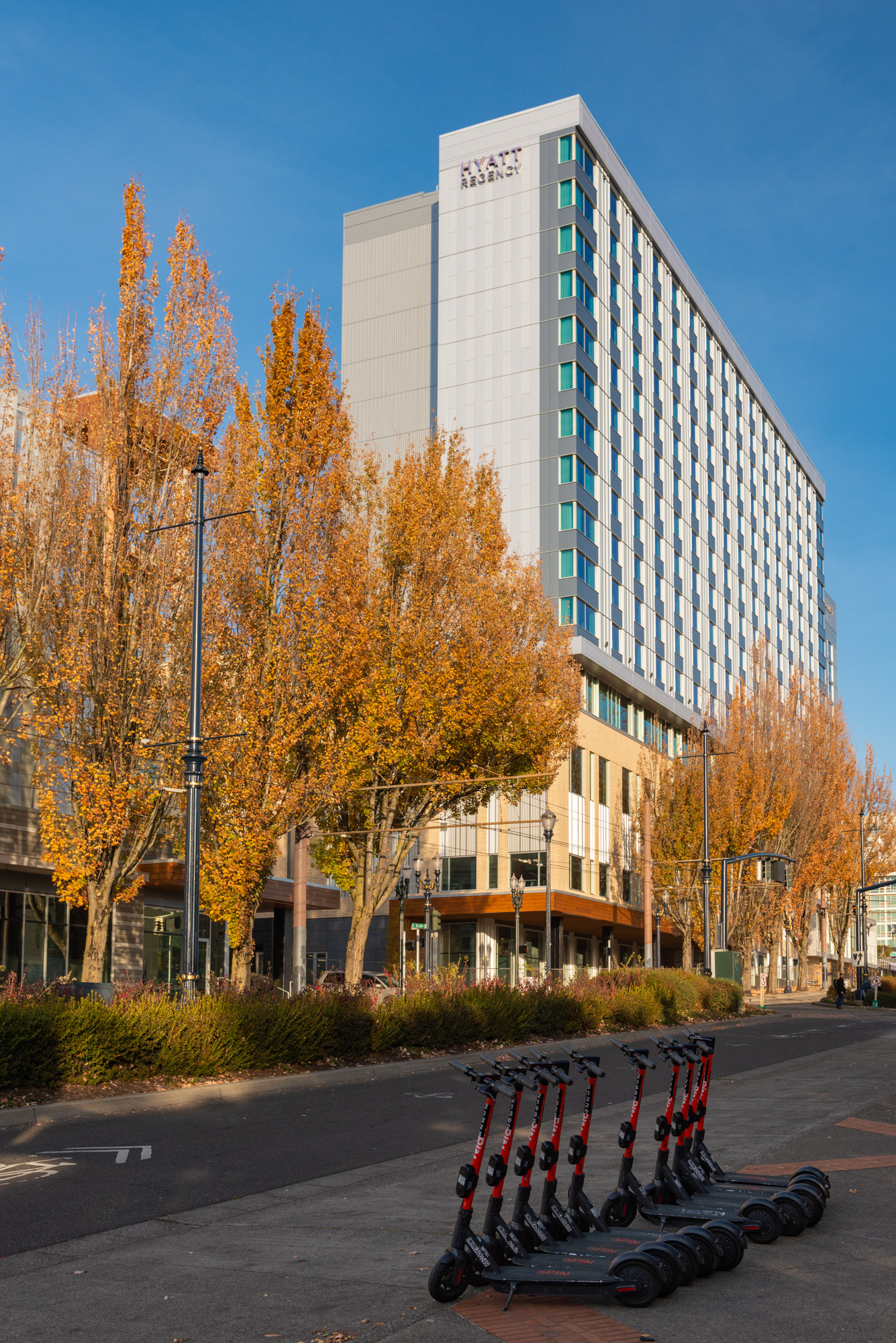
Hyatt Regency Oregon Convention Center - Portland, Oregon

Oklahoma

- Hyatt Regency Tulsa Downtown

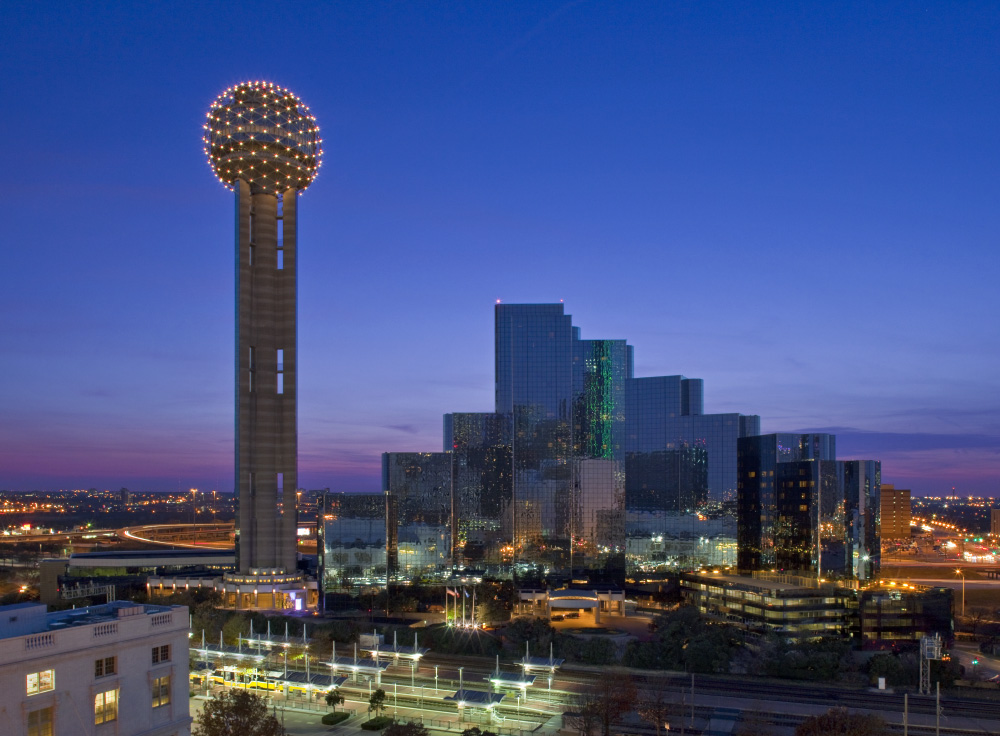
Hyatt Regency Dallas, Texas

Oregon

- Hyatt Regency Portland at the Oregon Convention Center

Pennsylvania

- Hyatt Regency Pittsburgh International Airport

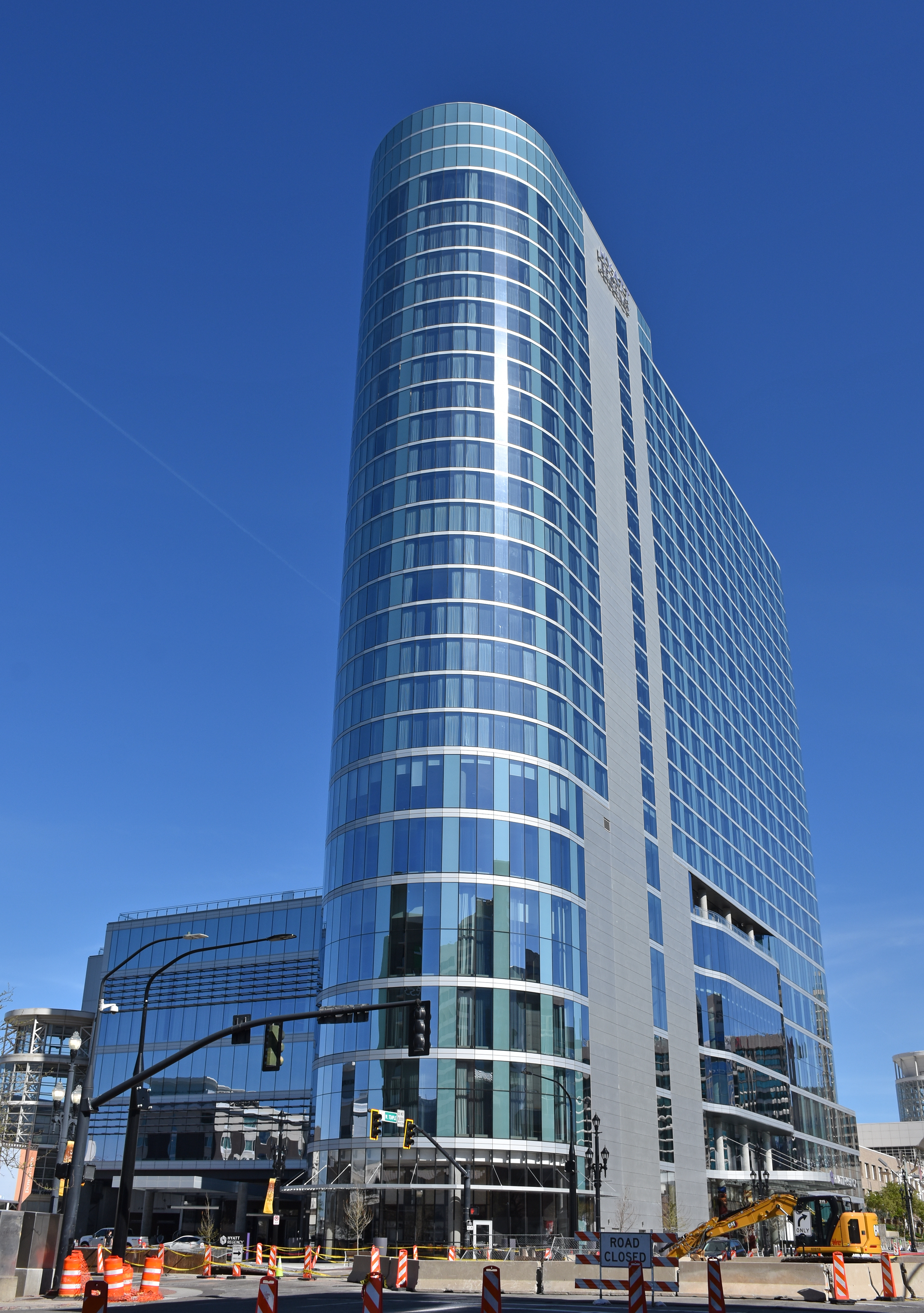
Hyatt Regency Salt Lake City, Utah

Puerto Rico

- Hyatt Regency Grand Reserve Puerto Rico

South Carolina

- Hyatt Regency Greenville

Texas

- Hyatt Regency Austin
- Hyatt Regency Baytown – Houston
- Hyatt Regency Conroe
- Hyatt Regency Dallas
- Hyatt Regency DFW International Airport
- Hyatt Regency Frisco - Dallas
- Hyatt Regency Hill Country Resort and Spa
- Hyatt Regency Houston Downtown
- Hyatt Regency Houston West
- Hyatt Regency Houston/Galleria
- Hyatt Regency Lost Pines Resort and Spa
- Hyatt Regency San Antonio Riverwalk

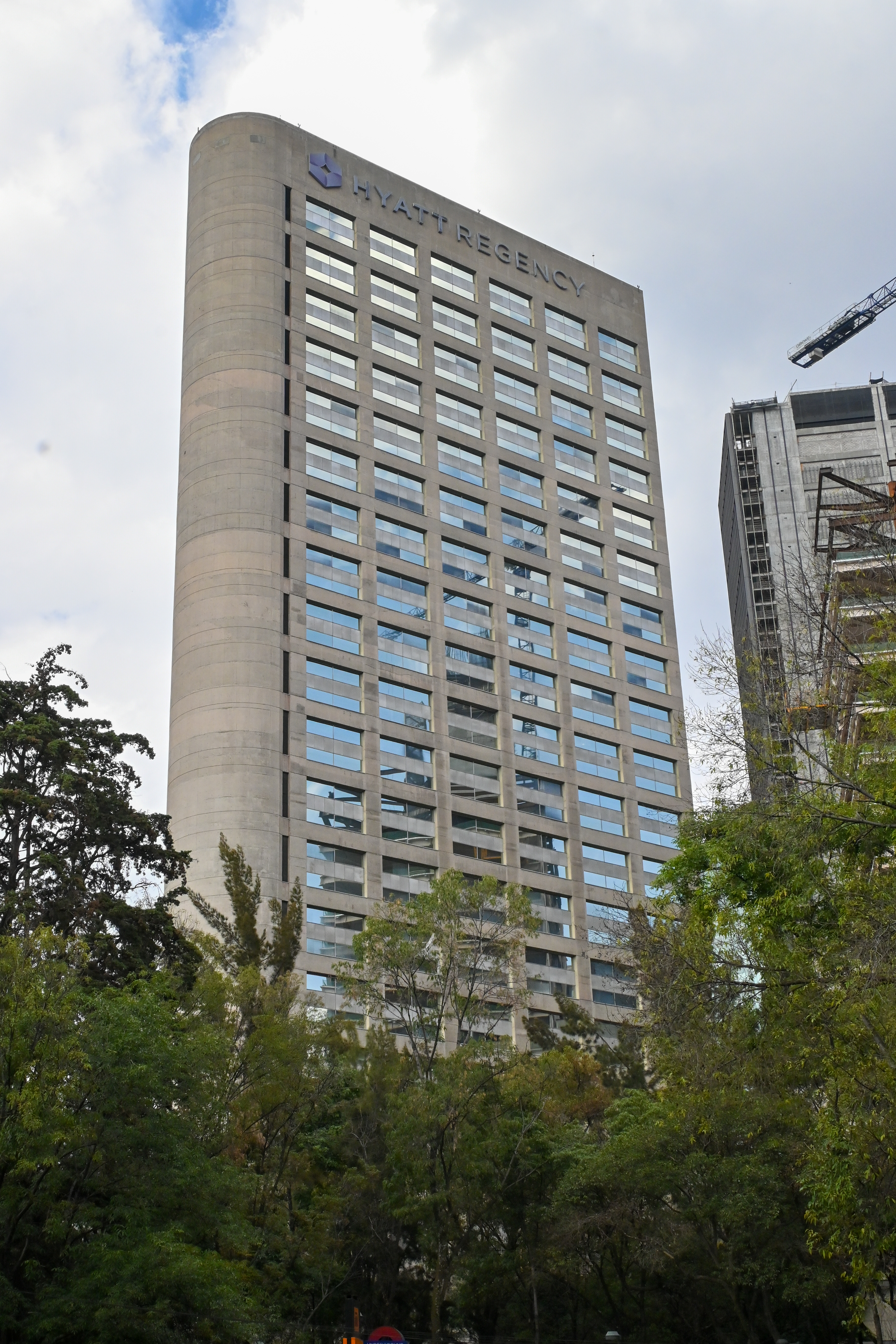
Hyatt Regency Mexico City, Mexico

Utah

- Hyatt Regency Salt Lake City

Virginia

- Hyatt Regency Crystal City at Reagan National Airport
- Hyatt Regency Dulles
- Hyatt Regency Reston
- Hyatt Regency Tysons Corner Center

Washington

- Hyatt Regency Bellevue on Seattle's Eastside
- Hyatt Regency Lake Washington at Seattle's Southport
- Hyatt Regency Seattle

Wisconsin

- Hyatt Regency Green Bay
- Hyatt Regency Milwaukee

Mexico

- Hyatt Regency Andares Guadalajara
- Hyatt Regency Merida
- Hyatt Regency Mexico City
- Hyatt Regency Mexico City Insurgentes
- Hyatt Regency San Luis Potosí
- Hyatt Regency Villahermosa

=== South America ===
Colombia

- Hyatt Regency Cartagena

Panama

- Hyatt Regency Panama City

=== Caribbean ===
Trinidad and Tobago

- Hyatt Regency Trinidad and Tobago

== Other ==
- Hyatt Regency walkway collapse
