= Ludhiana City Centre =

Coordinates: 30.878067°N 75.808429°E

Ludhiana City Centre is a multi-crore proposed project (now abandoned) which was launched in year 2003 in Shaheed Bhagat Singh Nagar, near Pakhowal road, Ludhiana, India. The proposed project would have five major constituents — The Mall, The Heights, The Forum, The Podium and Five-star hotel. The City centre has been spread over 25 acres (100,000 m^{2}) having shopping malls, 12 multiplexes, residential apartments, helipad and parking slot.

== History ==
The Ludhiana City Centre project was launched in 2005-06 by the Ludhiana Improvement Trust (LIT), to develop a mixed-use complex including a shopping mall, residential towers, a multiplex, and a helipad over 25 acres on Pakhowal Road, Ludhiana. Construction began in 2006 under contract to M/S Today Homes, with initial earthworks and foundational works completed by year's end. The main structural frames for the mall and two of the planned five towers rose by 2008. Then, the news of irregularities first emerged, which halted the further work despite partial completion of the podium and basement levels.

== City centre scam ==
Ludhiana City Centre was center of accusations of a multi-crore land and fund scam surfaced in 2006. The opposition MLAs accused then Chief Minister Captain Amarinder Singh and other officials of awarding the contract to Today Homes in exchange for kickbacks estimated between ₹100 crore and ₹300 crore. A 2007 vigilance probe charged 36 individuals, including the ex‑CM, but the case was abruptly closed in 2017 with the Punjab Vigilance Bureau concluding there was "no solid evidence of any scam". As of 2025, the site remains partially built and abandoned, with multiple legal challenges pending over land titles and stalled construction.

== See also ==
- Hyatt Regency Ludhiana
