= Hyatt Regency Manila =

Hyatt Regency Manila may refer to the following:

- Midas Hotel and Casino, formerly the Hyatt Regency Manila in Pasay, Philippines
- New Coast Hotel Manila, formerly the Hyatt Regency Hotel & Casino Manila, Philippines
- Hyatt Regency Hotel, at the City of Dreams Manila in Parañaque, Philippines
