= Hyatt Regency Trinidad and Tobago =

Hotel in Port of Spain, Trinidad and Tobago

Coordinates: 10.65039°N 61.51624°W

Hyatt Regency Trinidad is a luxury, high-rise hotel situated along the waterfront of the capital city of Trinidad and Tobago, Port of Spain.

The hotel is affiliated with the Hyatt Regency brand, part of the Hyatt Corporation based in Chicago, Illinois, US. The hotel's general manager since May 2024 is Michael Hooper.

The hotel was announced in 2005 as a partnership between Hyatt, which manages the property, and UDeCOTT which is its owner and developer. The builder/designer was Bouygues. The hotel opened in January 2008. In 2011, Hyatt initiated an arbitration against the government of Trinidad and Tobago and withheld owner remittances after government actions left ownership of the hotel unclear. The issue was resolved in 2014.

In 2024, the Hyatt Regency announced that it would stop accepting Trinidad and Tobago dollars, the local currency, causing a controversy. The hotel backtracked following public outcry. In response, Colm Imbert, T&T's Minister of Finance announced that the ministry would investigate the hotel's attempt to avoid TT$. The hotel is owned by UDeCOTT.
