= Hyatt Regency Delhi =

Hotel in New Delhi, India

Coordinates: 28.569°N 77.1852°E

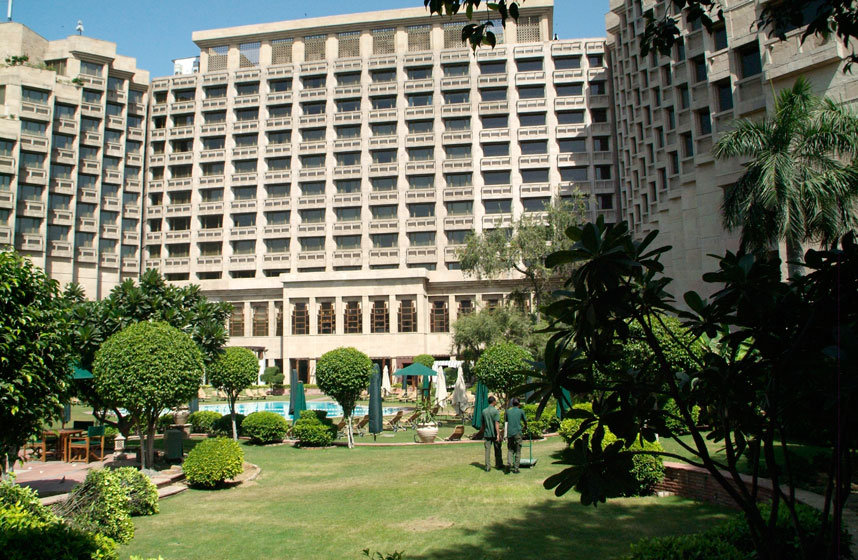
- Hyatt Regency Delhi
- Interactive map of the Hyatt Regency Delhi area
- Hotel chain: Hyatt

General information
- Location: India, Bhikaji Cama Place, Ring Road, New Delhi, India
- Opening: 1983
- Owner: Asian Hotels North Limited

Technical details
- Floor count: 7

Other information
- Number of rooms: 479
- Number of suites: 50

Website
- https://www.hyatt.com/en-US/hotel/india/hyatt-regency-delhi/delrd

The Hyatt Regency Delhi is a hotel in New Delhi, India, opened in 1983. It is the largest 5-star hotel in North India, in terms of number of rooms, with 495 rooms. It is located in Bhikaji Cama Place, near Chanakyapuri, in South Delhi. It is managed by Hyatt.

== History ==
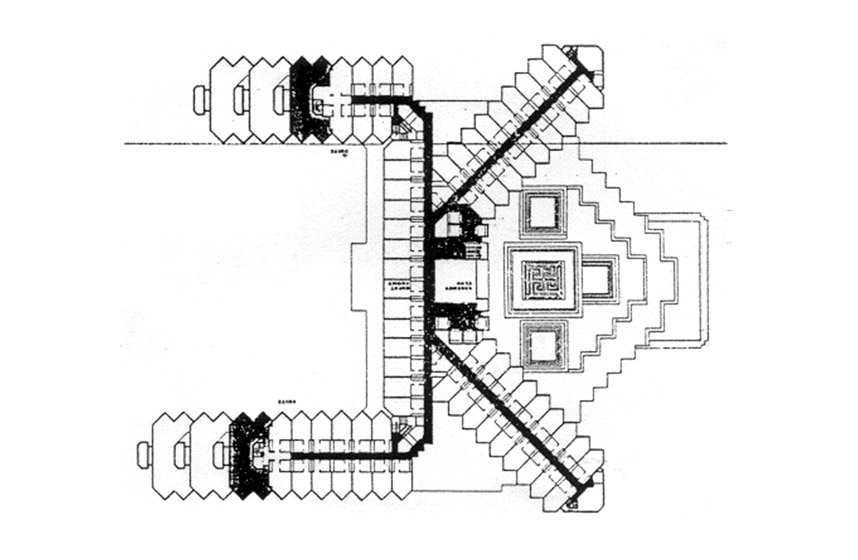
Hyatt Regency Delhi Design

Asian Hotels (North) Ltd was incorporated in 1980 and was promoted by R S Saraf, R K Jatia, Chaman Lal Gupta, three Non-Resident Indians together with Sushil Gupta and Shiv Jatia, their Indian Associates. The builders entered into a 10-year franchise agreement with Hyatt International, and the new hotel was the chain's first hotel in India. The hotel's construction was spurred by the Asian Games in 1982. The Hyatt Regency Delhi opened in 1983.

The hotel briefly ceased to be associated with Hyatt Hotels on November 6, 2020 before it entered bankruptcy in 2021. It has since rejoined the chain.

== Design ==
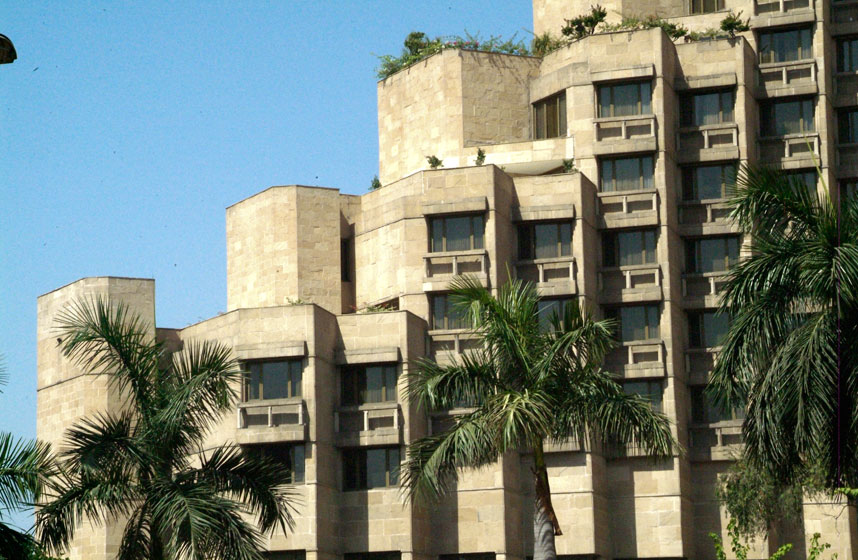
Staggered Composition of the Hotel

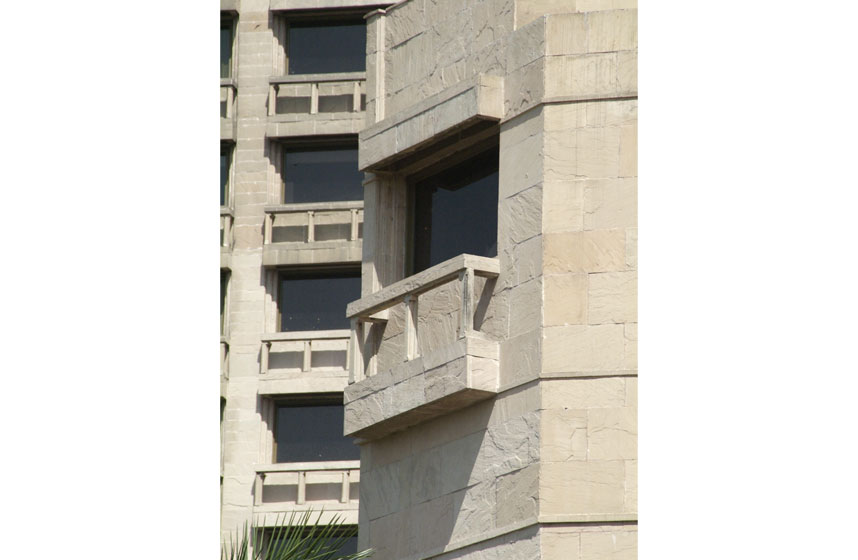
View of a room from outside

The design of the hotel features a staggered facade, with stepped back rooms.

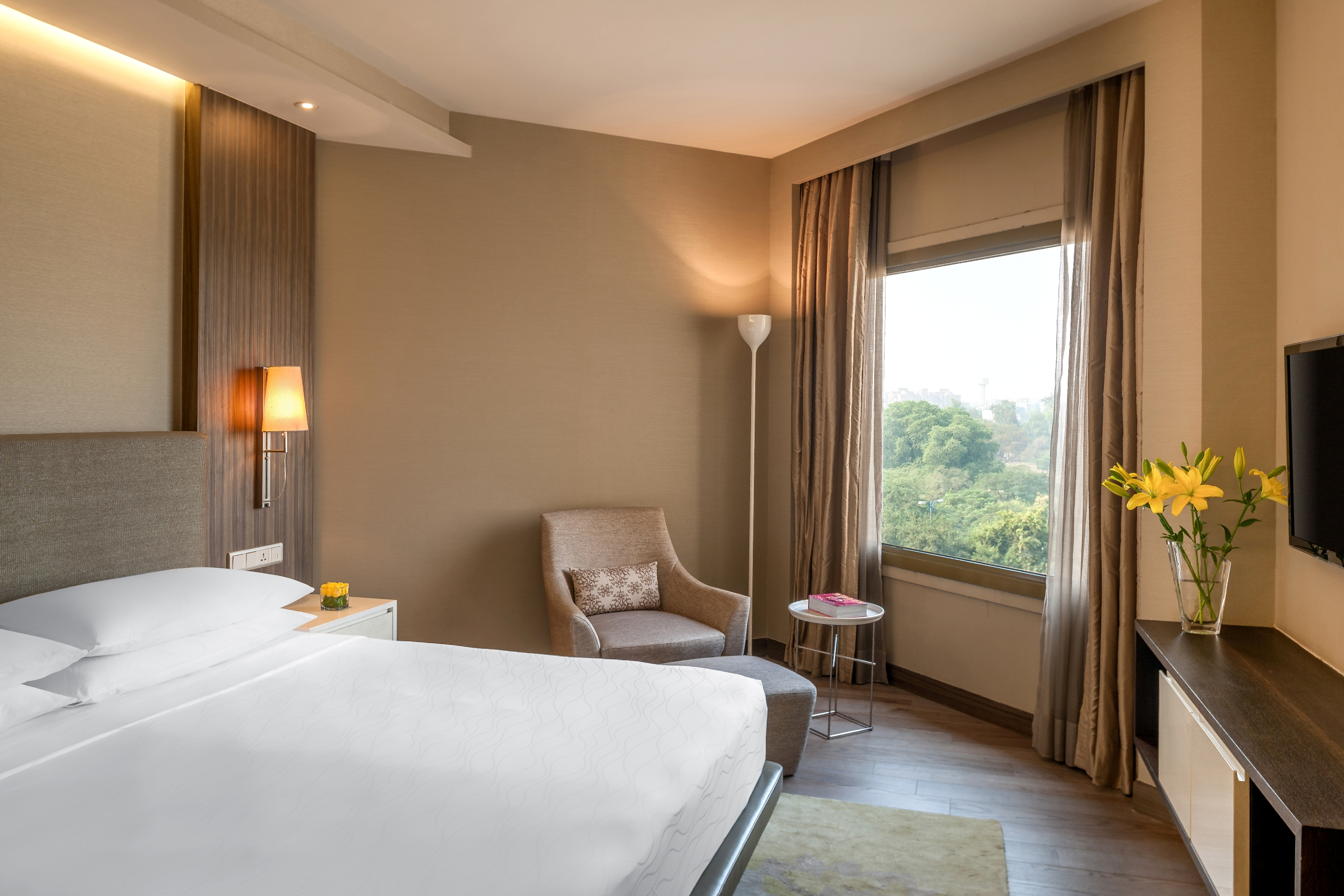
A Regency Suite King room in Hyatt Regency Delhi

== Controversies ==
On Sunday, March 17, 2002, 31-year-old socialite-photographer Natasha Singh, daughter-in-law of Natwar Singh, of the Indian National Congress, was found dead at the hotel after allegedly jumping from the roof.
