= Hyatt Regency Birmingham =

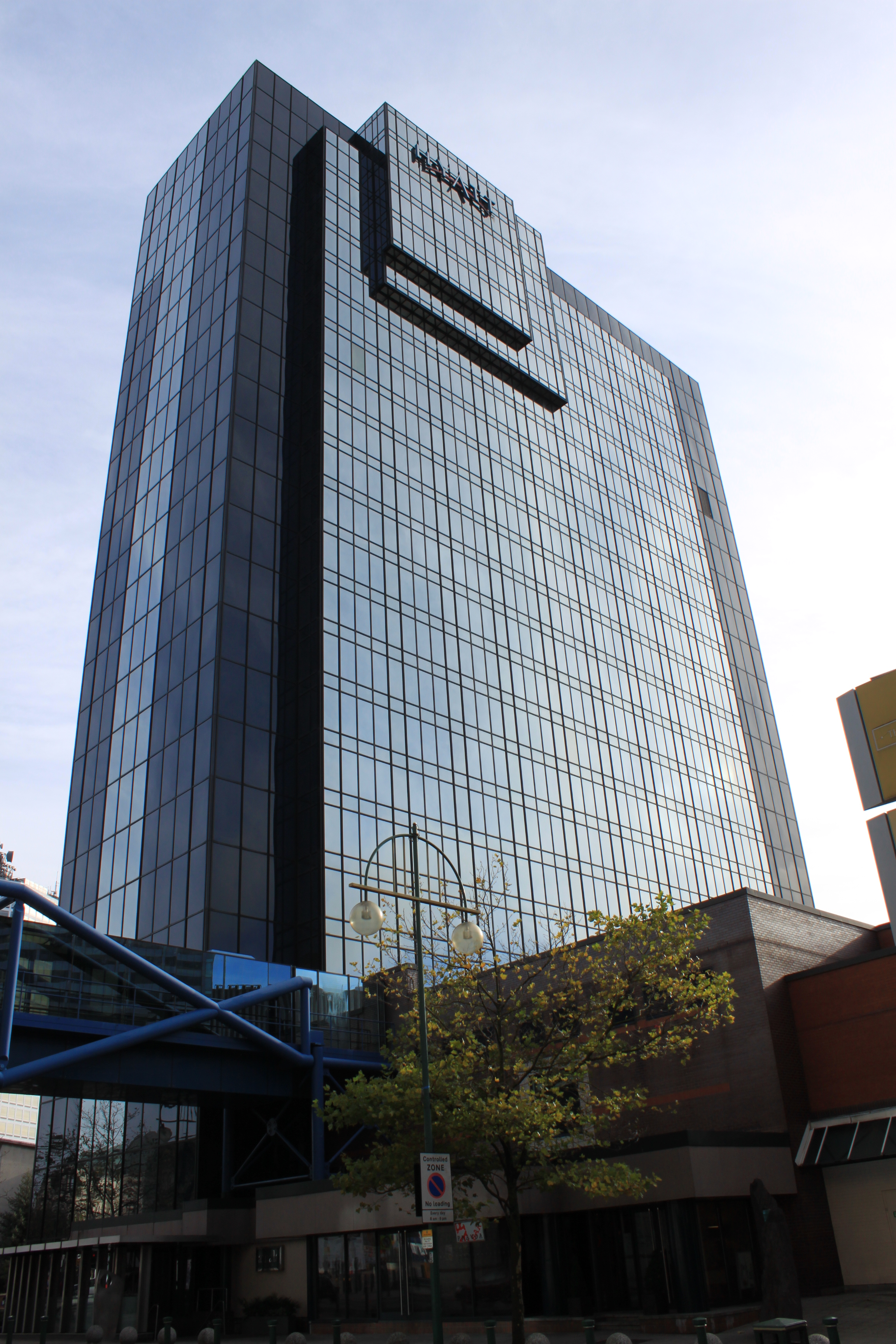

General information
- Type: Hotel
- Location: 2 Bridge Street, Birmingham, B1 2JZ, England
- Coordinates: 52.4779°N 1.9089°W
- Completed: 1990
- Operator: Hyatt Hotels Corporation

Technical details
- Floor count: 24
- Lifts/elevators: 4

Other information
- Number of rooms: 319
- Number of bars: 1

Website
- birmingham.regency.hyatt.com

The Hyatt Regency Birmingham is a hotel on Broad Street in the city centre of Birmingham, England. Hyatt Regency Birmingham stands at a height of 75 metres (246 feet) 24 floors and has 319 guest rooms. The hotel, which opened in July 1990, has a blue glass exterior facade, and stands across the road from the International Convention Centre.

The hotel was built, and is run by, Hyatt Regency Birmingham Ltd. This company is a public-sector/private-sector partnership between the Hyatt Corporation, Trafalgar House, and Birmingham City Council. The hotel cost £37 million to build, with £1.5 million of that being provided by the city, which also donated the building site, which was, according to estimates, worth £615,000 in 1987. In June 1991, the Hyatt accommodated members of the International Olympic Committee, who were attending its 97th annual session at the International Convention Centre. In 1998, the hotel provided accommodation for attendees at the G8 Summit held at the National Convention Centre opposite including the then UK Prime Minister Tony Blair.

In April 2002, the company (with the NEC Group as the third majority shareholder, after the demise of Trafalgar House) put the hotel building up for sale. In November 2002, the hotel was sold to London Plaza Hotels for £27.5 million, with Hyatt Regency Birmingham Ltd continuing to operate it. Birmingham City Council made a £5 million profit on the sale, from its 17.5% stake in the hotel, which it used to pay off debt.

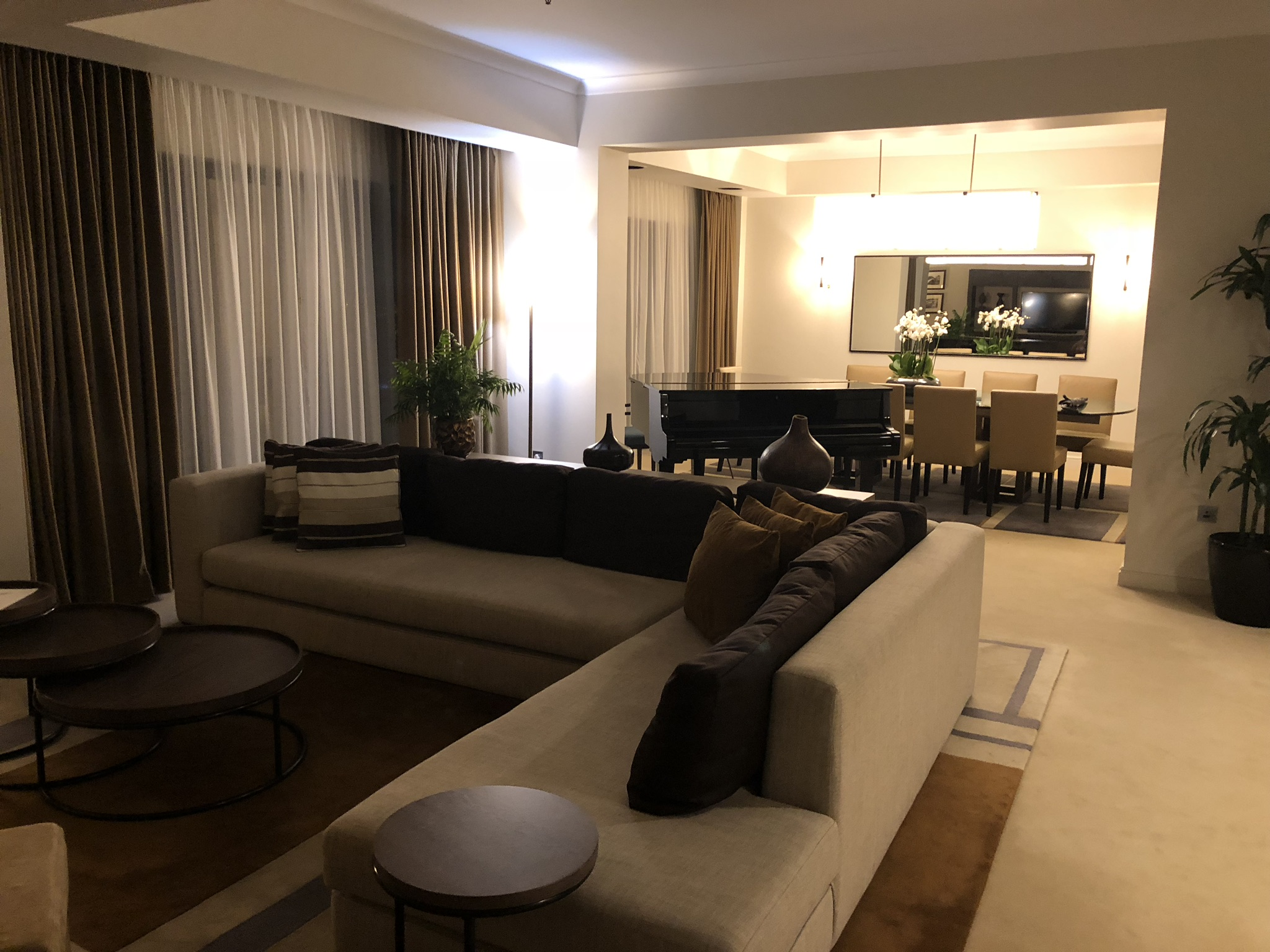
The lounge and dining area of the Presidential Suite, home to the Prime Minister during the Conservative Party conference.

The hotel was specifically constructed to have close ties to the International Convention Centre, including a private-access bridge that joins the two. This easy to secure link was one factor in attracting the 24th G8 summit to the city, as well as the 2000 NATO Meeting of Defence Ministers.

The Hyatt Hotels Corporation bought the hotel out of administration in 2012 for £27 million.

In 2014, they made a £6 million investment into the hotel which included a new pub with a heated terrace which opens onto Broad Street - The Gentleman & Scholar Pub and Terrace.

In 2016, the hotel was bought by a Middle East investment group (an affiliate of Sharjah-based Bin Otaiba) for £38.6 million. The hotel will keep its Hyatt Regency branding. The purchaser plans to spend approximately £2.7 million over the next three years on improving the venue.

As a result of its links with the conference centre, the Hyatt is the base for the Prime Minister when the Conservative Party conference is hosted in Birmingham.
