= New Coast Hotel Manila =

Hotel in Manila, Philippines

- The hotel as the Hyatt Regency Manila in 2014
- Interactive map of the New Coast Hotel Manila area
- Former names: Hyatt Regency Hotel & Casino Manila; New World Manila Bay Hotel

General information
- Location: Manila, Philippines
- Coordinates: 14°34′24.0″N 120°58′57.6″E
- Operator: New World Hotel

New Coast Hotel Manila is a hotel in Manila, Philippines.

== History ==
The hotel began construction in the late 1990s, with a 1999 opening planned as a Sheraton Hotels property. The hotel eventually opened in September 2004 as the Hyatt Regency Hotel & Casino Manila, part of the Hyatt hotel chain.

On January 1, 2015, New World Hotels took over the management of Hyatt Regency Manila and the hotel was rebranded as New World Manila Bay Hotel. In 2020, it adopted its current name, New Coast Hotel Manila. In November 2025, DigiPlus acquired a 53.89% controlling stake in International Entertainment Corp (IEC), the parent company of New Coast Hotel Manila, effectively owning the hotel.

== Accreditation ==
As of 2019, the Department of Tourism accredits the hotel with a five-star rating under its National Accreditation Standards.
