= Hyatt Regency Ludhiana =

Hotel in Ludhiana, India

Coordinates: 30.885798°N 75.7873888°E

- Interactive map of the Hyatt Regency Ludhiana area
- Hotel chain: Hyatt

General information
- Location: India, Site No. 4, Ferozepur Road, National Highway 95, Ludhiana, Punjab
- Operator: Hyatt Hotels Corporation

Technical details
- Floor count: 8

Other information
- Number of rooms: 164
- Number of suites: 24

Website
- https://www.hyatt.com/en-US/hotel/india/hyatt-regency-ludhiana/luhrl

The Hyatt Regency Ludhiana is a Hyatt Hotel located in Ludhiana, Punjab, India. It is on the Chandigarh-Ferozepur road, off to National Highway 95 in Ludhiana’s commercial corridor, adjacent to the Wave Mall. It is also in close proximity to the Railway Station and Inter State Bus Terminal (ISBT).

== The Hotel ==
The hotel opened in 2014 and is owned by the Piccadily group. The hotel has 164 standard rooms including 24 suites. There are two restaurants: Kitchen at 95 and The Gallery Bar.

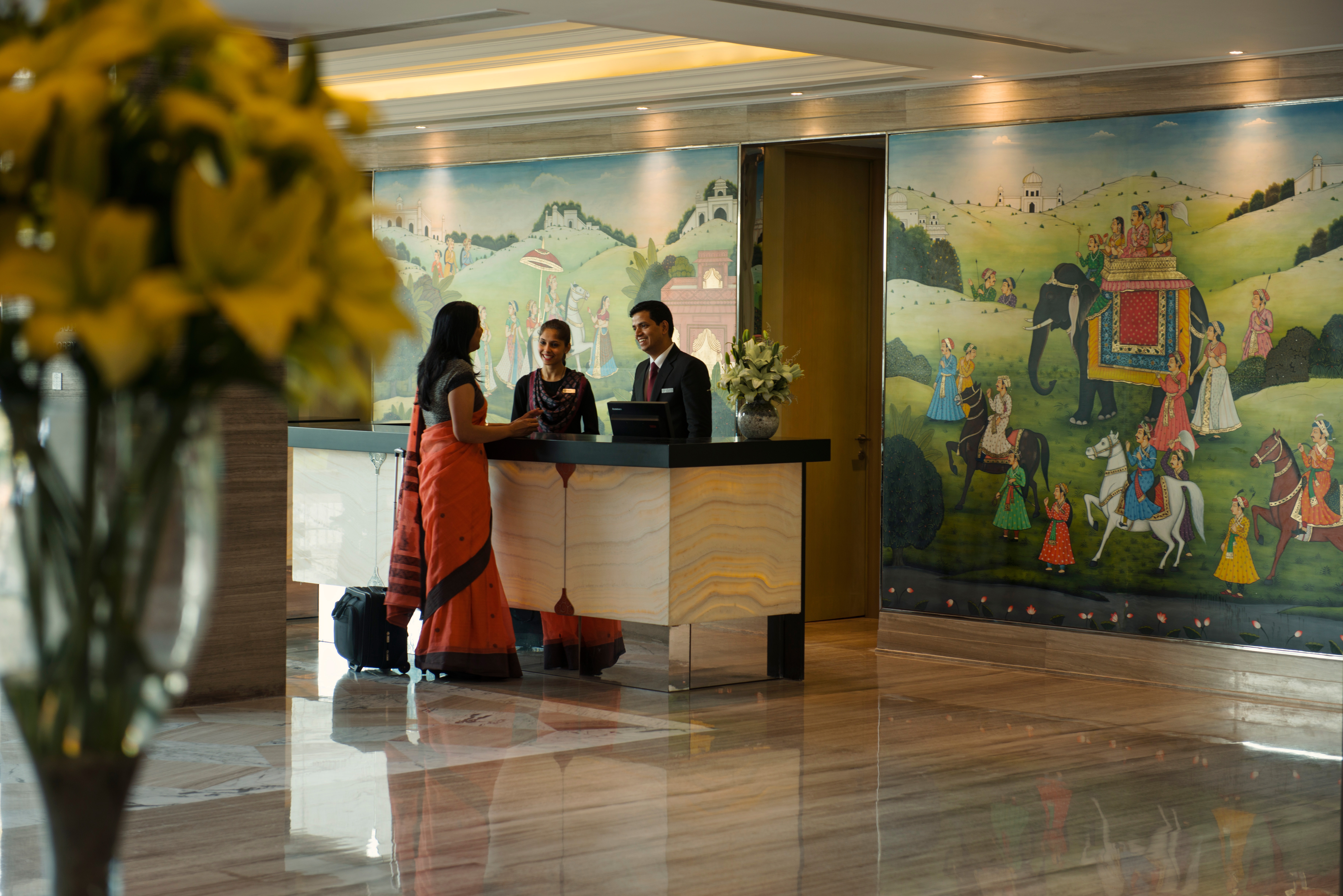
Hotel in Ludhiana
