= Thompson Seattle =

Hotel in Seattle

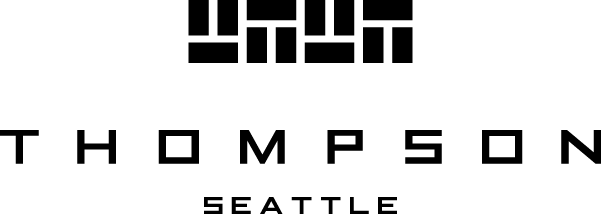
- Logo
- Interactive map of the Thompson Seattle area
- Hotel chain: Thompson Hotels

General information
- Type: Hotel
- Classification: 4 stars
- Location: 110 Stewart Street, Seattle, Washington, United States
- Coordinates: 47°36′38″N 122°20′29″W
- Opening: June 1, 2016
- Owner: Hyatt

Technical details
- Floor count: 12

Design and construction
- Architect: Olson Kundig
- Developer: Turner Construction

Other information
- Number of rooms: 152
- Number of restaurants: 1
- Number of bars: 1

Website
- Official website

Thompson Seattle is a boutique hotel in Seattle, Washington, United States. It opened on June 1, 2016. The 12-story four-star hotel has 152 rooms and five types of suites. It is located in Downtown Seattle. When it opened, Thompson Seattle originally was owned by John Pritzker's Commune Hotels & Resorts. Hyatt became the owner in 2018.

The architectural firm Olson Kundig designed Thompson Seattle, which is part of a mixed-use development that includes 95 serviced apartments. The hotel features amenities such as a rooftop bar, a hotel, a tiny gym and a concierge service.

== History ==
Thompson Seattle was designed by Olson Kundig. Jensen Fey Architecture & Planning worked on the interior design, with hotel concept and interior layout for the living spaces by Studio Munge. Turner Construction was the genera contractor.

At its founding, the hotel was part of the Thompson Hotels, a brand of Commune Hotels & Resorts, which was owned by John Pritzker. Thompson Seattle is a segment of a mixed-use development that houses both the hotel and 95 serviced apartments. When it opened, a partnership between Geolo Capital and TC Real Estate Development was the owner of the development. Douglas Howe and Shawn Parry, previous leaders of Touchstone, were the owners of TC. Touchstone, Geolo, and TC made public in August 2014 that their construction property would be run by the Thompson Seattle brand. The hotel began operations on June 1, 2016, and is the ninth Thompson branch. A ribbon-cutting event was held on June 28 that year. Thompson Seattle is the inaugural Pacific Northwest location under the Thompson brand.

Commune and the luxury hotel operator Destination Hotels merged, creating a new company called Two Roads Hospitality in September 2016. Including Thompson Seattle, there were 10 Thompson properties in 2017 under Two Roads Hospitality. After Hyatt acquired Two Roads Hospitality in November 2018, the Thompson brand became part of Hyatt. Thompson Seattle entered into a partnership in 2020 with The Emerald, a condominium, which was opening in the middle of the year. The deal allowed condominium residents to access the hotel's amenities such as parking, charging stations for electric vehicles, and dining discounts. In the midst of the COVID-19 pandemic in Seattle in 2020, Hyatt said that it was set to furlough 178 staff members across its Hyatt Regency Lake Washington and Thompson Seattle properties and would do 50 permanent job cuts at the latter. The travel magazine Condé Nast Traveler included Thompson Seattle as one of the 75 hotels on its 2024 Gold List, which features the hotels it considers the finest.

== Location ==
Located in Downtown Seattle, Thompson Seattle is situated on the summit of a sharply inclined hill on 1st Avenue. It occupies one-fourth of a block. The hotel is one block uphill from Seattle Great Wheel and Pike Place Market.

== Architecture and decor ==
The Seattle-based architectural firm Olson Kundig designed the four-star Thompson Seattle, a 12-story boutique hotel. It has a geometric glass outer structure. Echoing the deviation in the street grid formed by the intersection of 1st Avenue and Stewart Street, the arrangement of each two stories is subtly misaligned. Reflecting on the asymmetry, Hana R. Alberts, a writer for the New York Post called the building "architecturally avant-garde". Windows that span from the ceiling to the floor pull into hotel rooms views of the waterfront Pike Place Market. The middle of the building has an open-air courtyard, which can be entered through the street and the alley.

Prior to implementing the property's interior design, staff members of parent corporation Commune Hotels & Resorts explored the neighborhoods Capitol Hill and Ballard to get a feel for Seattle living. The lobby is partitioned from the restaurant Conversation by a floating staircase featuring glass edges. In a nod to the city's aviation background, the inside features uncovered concrete and steel surfaces. The décor blends retro and contemporary aesthetics and features works by local artists. The staff rotate the elevator welcome mat to display different messages based on the time of day.

== Amenities ==
=== Guest rooms ===
The hotel has 152 rooms and five types of suites. Owing to the structure's design, the hotel used 30 unique floor plans for the rooms. Rooms follow the mid-century modern design and have a masculine aesthetic, but are given a gentler vibe through subtle feminine elements such as art, candles, and bookcases. Rooms types vary, with some overlooking the water, others the courtyard, and some the city.

The most expensive room when the hotel opened in 2016 was the Thompson Suite, which was decorated with cowhides spread across the floor. The suites that face the water are equipped with telescopes to give a clearer view of the area. In mid-2023, the hotel opened two penthouse suites that each spanned 320 sq ft (30 m^{2}) and included a record player.

=== Restaurants and bar ===
==== The Nest ====
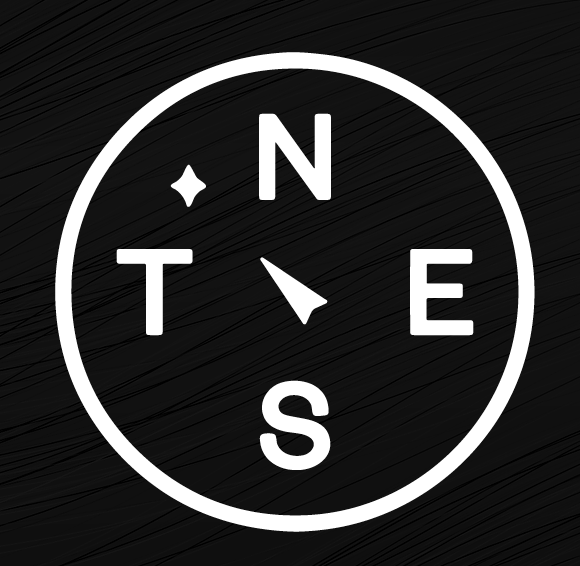
Logo of the rooftop bar, The Nest

Thompson Seattle has a lounge and rooftop bar called The Nest. Situated on the uppermost level on the 13th floor, the bar has both interior and an exterior seating. It is modeled after The Aviary, a cocktail bar in Chicago. The bar has a geodesic dome area called the Rain Drop, which began operations in July 2023 and is equipped with a karaoke machine and a fireplace. Young professionals make up a significant part of the bar's clientele. Through happy hour, the bar attracts people who live nearby to visit.

The Huxley Wallace Collective designed the appetizer-sized communal dishes on the bar's menu. Drinks are dispensed from copper containers shaped like flamingos and bird-inspired names are given to the cocktails. There is no kitchen in the venue so food is served through carts.

==== Scout ====
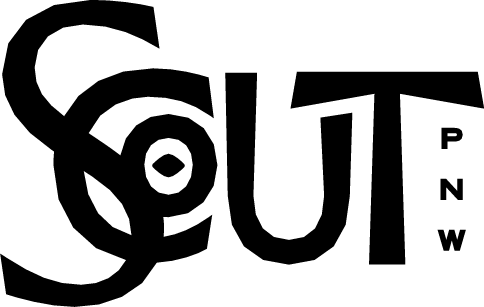
Logo of the former restaurant, Scout

Next to the lobby, the hotel's restaurant Scout seated 75 people. A private opening was held on June 1, 2016, while the public debut happened five days later. The interior designer, Matthew Parker, incorporated references to Seattle and expressed the concept of "scout" in the decor. The private area named "Cabin" that seated 20 people was a log cabin-inspired structure.

The Huxley Wallace Collective founded Scout. Around mid-2018, Thompson Seattle took over Scout's management from the Huxley Wallace Collective after the Collective fragmented. Scout ceased operations on January 14, 2019, to allow for a full overhaul and rename.

==== Conversation ====
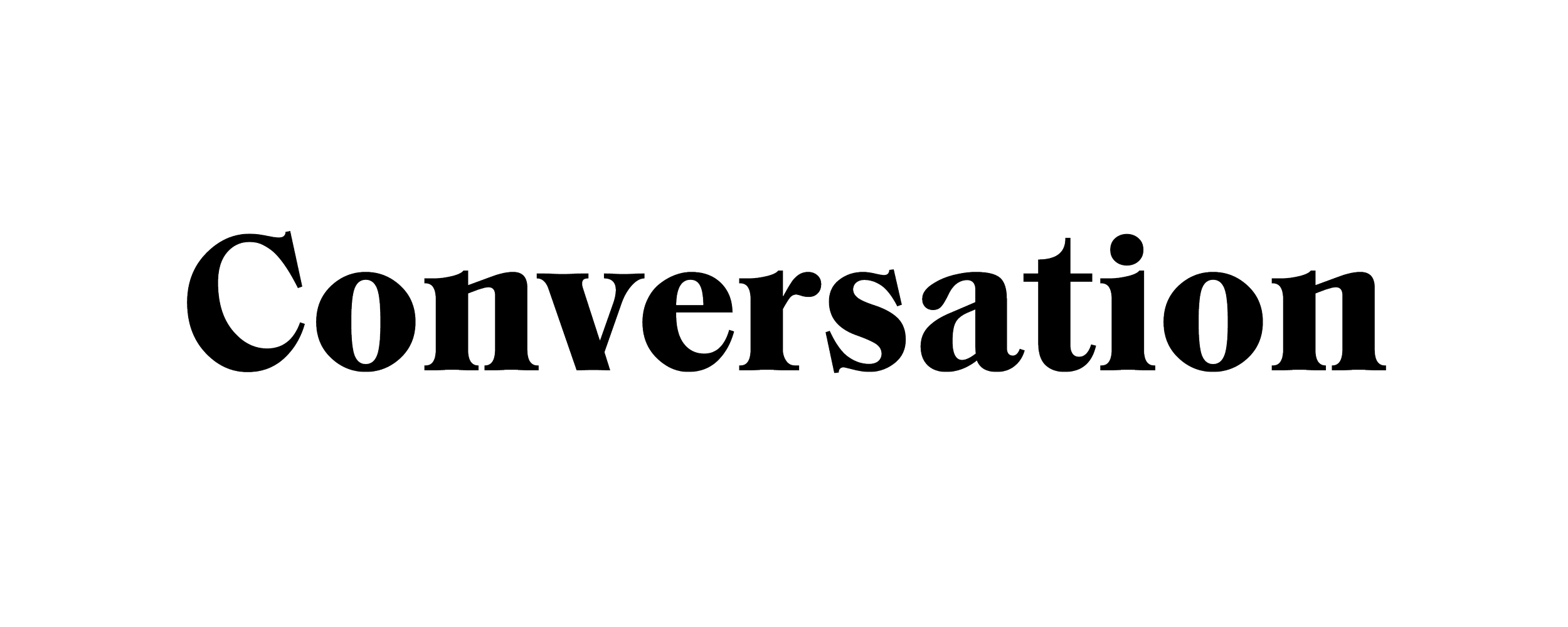
Logo of the restaurant Conversation

Conversation is a restaurant connected to the hotel's lobby. Opened on May 8, 2019, it replaced Scout, which had shut down in January. People who live in the area frequent the restaurant more than tourists. Conversation was designed by Rebel House Design, which is based in Chicago. To encourage conversation, Conversation placed cards in the menu containing questions diners could ask each other.

Conversation's founding executive chef was Derek Simcik, who had managed Scout, its predecessor. Simcik was educated in French cooking techniques and has family in the Southern United States, which heavily influenced the redesigned menu. Conversation serves international cuisine including French and Japanese. The restaurant serves dishes inspired by Seattle's food culture with ingredients sourced from the area's fauna and flora.

=== Facilities and services ===
Thompson Seattle has a small gym that is open to both hotel guests and residents of the neighboring apartment complex. Open 24 hours, it is on the third floor and offers a view of 1st Avenue. The hotel has three floors of underground parking and meeting rooms.

The hotel provides a concierge service. For a fee, concierges in 2018 offered personalized tours around Belltown and Pike Place Market. Guests in 2024 could join a dog-guided truffle foraging experience followed by a truffle-themed dinner. Thompson Seattle had a "Tattoo Artist in Residency" initiative in 2022 that allowed customers to book sessions with visiting tattoo artists.
