= Mark Harris =

Mark Harris may refer to:

== Arts and entertainment ==
- Mark Harris (author) (1922–2007), American novelist known for baseball novels, especially Bang the Drum Slowly
- Mark Yale Harris (born 1936), American sculptor
- Mark Jonathan Harris (born 1941), American documentary filmmaker
- Mark Harris (composer) (born 1955), American musician and composer
- Mark Harris (musician) (born 1962), American Contemporary Christian musician
- Mark Harris (journalist) (born 1963), American entertainment columnist and magazine editor
- Mark Harris (jazz musician) (born 1975), Australian jazz musician and creator/member of band Lah-Lah
- Mark Harris, fictional character in the American TV series Man from Atlantis

== Politics and law ==
- Mark Harris (Maine politician) (1779–1843), United States Representative from Maine
- Mark Harris (North Carolina politician) (born 1966), American pastor and politician
- Mark Harris (Idaho politician), Idaho State Senator since 2015
- Mark O. Harris (born 1950), Wyoming politician
- Mark Harris, a Fathers 4 Justice campaigner in the United Kingdom

== Sports ==
- Mark Harris (rugby league) (1947–2020), Australian rugby league footballer
- Mark Harris (English footballer) (born 1963), English association football player
- Mark Harris (rower) (fl. 1970s), British rower
- Mark Harris (American football) (born 1970), American professional football player
- Mark Harris (softball) (born 1985), Australian softball player
- Mark Harris (Welsh footballer) (born 1998), Welsh international footballer
- Mark Harris (bodybuilder) (fl. 2000s), Welsh professional bodybuilder

== Others ==
- Mark Harris (publisher), American co-founder of Lumina Media (I-5 Publications), successor company to Fancy Publications (BowTie, Inc.)

== See also ==
- Marc Harris, Panamanian accountant
- Marcus Harris (disambiguation)
