= Summerfield Suites =

Former hotel chain

Summerfield Suites was an extended stay hotel chain. It was bought by Hyatt and folded within that company in 2012. All Summerfield Suites Hotels are now branded as Hyatt House hotels.

== History ==
In June 2005, the Blackstone Group acquired Wyndham International for $3.2 billion. Summerfield Suites, Wyndham's extended-stay offering, was included in the deal. On December 1, 2005, Global Hyatt confirmed that it had entered into a definitive agreement to acquire the 21-hotel Summerfield Suites brand from Blackstone for an undisclosed price. The deal concluded in early 2006, and closely followed Hyatt's acquisition of AmeriSuites – now re-branded as Hyatt Place. It took AmeriSuites' former position in the Hyatt lineup and competed in the upscale tier of the extended-stay market with Residence Inn, Homewood Suites, and Staybridge Suites.

Global Hyatt then developed an extended-stay prototype for converting Summerfield Suites hotels to a new Hyatt-branded extended-stay product. The new offering provides fully equipped 1 and 2 bedroom suites, a free hot breakfast buffet, an outdoor BBQ area, 24-hour convenience store, movie rental, dry cleaning and recreational facilities. However, Summerfield Suites targeted both the extended-stay market as well as the group travel market. The first location opened in 1990.

The hotels operated as Hyatt Summerfield Suites until 2012, when the chain was folded into Hyatt House, a then new division of Hyatt incorporating these hotels, as well as the former Sierra Hotels, which had also been bought by Hyatt. The Hyatt House name was a nod to the original name of the entire chain in the 1960s and 1970s, when it was called Hyatt House Hotels.
