= Oscar Wang =

Oscar Wang may refer to:

- Oscar Wang (singer) (born 1998), Chinese singer and dancer
- Oscar Wang (visual artist) (born 1990), Chinese designer and visual artist
