= Hyatt Regency Hong Kong =

Hyatt Regency Hong Kong may refer to:

- Hyatt Regency Hong Kong, Tsim Sha Tsui, located in Kowloon, Hong Kong
- Hyatt Regency Hong Kong, Sha Tin, located in New Territories, Hong Kong
- Hyatt Regency Hong Kong, formerly located at 63 Nathan Road

See also

- Grand Hyatt Hong Kong
