= Marcus Harris =

Marcus Harris may refer to:

- Marcus Harris (cornerback) (born 2001), American football player
- Marcus Harris (cricketer) (born 1992), Australian cricketer
- Marcus Harris (defensive tackle) (born 2000), American football player
- Marcus Harris (wide receiver, born 1974), American football player
- Marcus Harris (wide receiver, born 1989), American football player
- Marcus Harris, child actor in The Famous Five

== See also ==
- Marc Harris (born c. 1965), Panamanian accountant
- Mark Harris (disambiguation)
