= Hyatt =

American multinational hospitality company

Hyatt Hotels Corporation

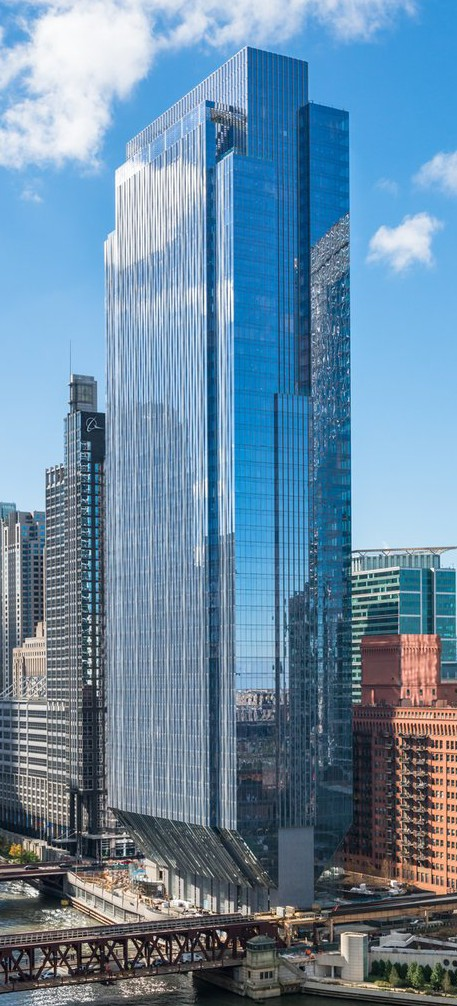
- 150 North Riverside, the headquarters of Hyatt in Chicago, Illinois
- Type: Public
- Traded as: NYSE: H (Class A); FWB: 1HTA; S&P 400 component
- ISIN: US4485791028
- Industry: Hospitality, travel, tourism
- Founded: September 27, 1957; 69 years ago
- Founders: Hyatt Robert von Dehn; Jack D. Crouch; Jay Pritzker
- Headquarters: 150 North Riverside, Chicago, Illinois, U.S.
- Number of locations: 1,335 hotels; 322,141 rooms (2023)
- Area served: Worldwide
- Key people: Mark Hoplamazian, Chairman and CEO
- Products: Hotels and resorts
- Services: Resort management; Brand management; Tour operator; Travel agency; Destination management
- Revenue: ▲US$6.67 billion (2023)
- Operating income: ▼US$305 million (2023)
- Net income: ▼US$220 million (2023)
- Total assets: ▲US$12.8 billion (2023)
- Total equity: ▼US$3.56 billion (2023)
- Number of employees: c. 206,000 (2023)
- Subsidiaries: Apple Leisure Group
- Website: hyatt.com

Hyatt Hotels Corporation, commonly known as Hyatt Hotels & Resorts, is an American multinational hospitality company headquartered in the Riverside Plaza area of Chicago that manages and franchises luxury and business hotels, resorts, and vacation properties. Hyatt Hotels & Resorts is one of the businesses managed by the Pritzker family. Hyatt has more than 1350 hotels and all-inclusive properties in 69 countries, across North America, South America, Europe, Asia, Africa and Australia.

The Hyatt Corporation came into being upon purchase of the Hyatt House, at Los Angeles International Airport, on September 27, 1957. In 1969, Hyatt began expanding internationally.

Hyatt has expanded its footprint through a number of acquisitions, including the acquisition of AmeriSuites (later rebranded Hyatt Place) in 2004, Summerfield Suites (later rebranded Hyatt House) in 2005, Two Roads Hospitality in 2018, Apple Leisure Group in 2021, Dream Hotel Group in 2023 and Standard International in 2024.

== History ==
=== Foundation and early years ===
The first Hyatt House was opened in 1954 by business partners Hyatt Robert von Dehn and Jack Dyer Crouch as a motel near Los Angeles International Airport. In 1957, the hotel was purchased by entrepreneur Jay Pritzker for US$2.2 million. His younger brother, Donald Pritzker, also took on an important role in the company. Considering the growing use of air travel for business, the Pritzker brothers realized that locating a high-quality hotel near a major airport was a valuable business strategy. Within two years, they opened Hyatt House Hotels near San Francisco International Airport and Seattle–Tacoma International Airport.

The company went public in 1962 as Hyatt Corporation. It had two divisions: Hyatt House Hotels and Hyatt Chalet Motels (renamed Hyatt Lodges in 1966).

In 1967, the company opened the Regency Hyatt House in Atlanta, Georgia (today named the Hyatt Regency Atlanta). The futuristic hotel was designed by Atlanta architect John Portman, who would go on to design many other hotels for the chain. It featured a massive indoor atrium, which soon became a distinctive feature of many Hyatt properties.

In 1968, Hyatt International was formed, to operate hotels outside the United States. It would soon become a separate company. In 1969, Hyatt opened its first international hotel, when it was awarded the management contract for the President Hotel in Hong Kong, which was renamed the Hong Kong Hyatt Hotel (later known as the Hyatt Regency Hong Kong).

In 1972, Hyatt formed Elsinore Corporation, a subsidiary to operate the Four Queens Hotel and Casino and the Hyatt Regency Lake Tahoe Resort, Spa & Casino. Donald Pritzker died in 1972 and Jay Pritzker continued to run the company.

Hyatt became a private company in 1979, when the Pritzkers bought the outstanding shares. Elsinore was spun off as a public company. The company opened the Playboy Hotel and Casino as a joint venture with Playboy Enterprises.

Alongside the Hyatt Regency brand, the company introduced the Grand Hyatt brand in 1980, with the opening of the Grand Hyatt New York (now Hyatt Grand Central). That same year, the boutique Park Hyatt brand was also introduced.

The Pritzkers took Hyatt International private as well, in 1982. However, Hyatt and Hyatt International remained two separate companies until June 2004, when substantially all of the hospitality assets owned by the Pritzker family business interests, including Hyatt Corporation and Hyatt International Corporation, were consolidated under a single entity called Global Hyatt Corp. On June 30, 2009, Global Hyatt Corporation changed its name to Hyatt Hotels Corporation.

=== Development since the 2000s ===
In December 2004, Hyatt Hotels Corporation acquired AmeriSuites, an upscale chain of all-suite business class hotels from affiliates of the Blackstone Group, a New York-based private equity investment firm. Blackstone had inherited AmeriSuites from its 2004 acquisition of Prime Hospitality. The AmeriSuites chain was rebranded and called Hyatt Place, a competitor to the limited-service products Marriott International's Courtyard by Marriott and Hilton Worldwide's Hilton Garden Inn.

In December 2005, Hyatt acquired limited service company Summerfield Suites from the Blackstone Group. Blackstone had inherited Summerfield Suites from its purchase of Wyndham International. In January 2012, Hyatt Summerfield Suites were rebranded as Hyatt House in 2012 to compete in the "upscale extended stay market" against Residence Inn, Homewood Suites, and Staybridge Suites.

Hyatt launched its first lifestyle brand, Andaz, in April 2007. Hindi for the word 'style', Andaz is positioned as a luxury brand, with the first hotel being a rebrand of the Great Eastern Hotel in London, followed by hotels in San Diego, West Hollywood, Shanghai and New York City.

In August 2009, it was reported that Hyatt Hotels Corporation filed plans to raise up to $1.15 billion in an initial share sale. That November Hyatt completed an initial public offering and began trading publicly on the New York Stock Exchange under the symbol H. According to the filing Mark S. Hoplamazian was to serve as CEO and Thomas Pritzker as Executive Chairman. The public offering was a result of the acrimonious breakup of the Pritzker family empire. Accused of looting family trusts, Thomas and cousins Penny and Nicholas took control of the family businesses when they and other family members were sued by cousin Liesel Pritzker, claiming fraud and seeking damages of over US$6 billion.

On August 31, 2009 three Hyatt hotels in Boston laid off their entire housekeeping staffs, outsourcing the work to a Georgia company creating strong public backlash. Massachusetts Governor Deval Patrick threatened a boycott of the hotels by state employees traveling on official business. The housekeepers, who were fired without previous notice although some of them had worked for the Hyatt for over 20 years, became collectively known as the Hyatt 100. In December 2009, Hyatt was named the "Massachusetts Scrooge of the Year" by Jobs with Justice.

On September 1, 2011, Hyatt acquired Hotel Sierra, which had 18 properties in 10 states. Along with Hyatt Summerfield Suites hotels, several of these properties were rebranded as Hyatt House in January 2012.

In November 2013, Hyatt introduced their first all-inclusive resort brands, Hyatt Ziva and Hyatt Zilara, with the first resorts being opened in Cancun, Puerto Vallarta, Los Cabos and Rose Hall, Montego Bay, Jamaica.

On October 28, 2015, Hyatt announced that they were in advanced talks to acquire Starwood Hotels in a cash and stock transaction. The transaction was not completed, and Starwood was acquired by Marriott International instead.

In 2018, Hyatt saw expansion with the acquisition of Two Roads Hospitality. This added the Joie de Vivre, Destination, Alila, and Thompson hotel brands to the Hyatt portfolio, a growth of 85 hotels in 23 markets.

In March 2021, Hyatt announced the official opening of Hyatt's 1,000th hotel worldwide, Alila Napa Valley in St. Helena, California.

In August 2021, Hyatt acquired Apple Leisure Group (ALG), a luxury resort-management services, travel and hospitality group, from affiliates of Kohlberg Kravis Roberts and KSL Capital Partners for $2.7 billion in cash. ALG's hotel portfolio consists of over 33,000 rooms operating in 10 countries. The acquisition will extend Hyatt's brand footprint into 11 more European markets.

In November 2022, Hyatt acquired Dream Hotels Group, a lifestyle hotel operator for $125 million, with up to an additional $175 million over the next six years as properties come into the pipeline and open. Dream Hotels Group's portfolio include 12 managed or franchised lifestyle hotels under four brands.

In April 2023, Hyatt acquired Mr and Mrs Smith, a UK-based platform offering direct booking access to over 1,500 boutique and luxury properties worldwide for £53.0 million in cash consideration.

In June 2024, Hyatt acquired the me and all hotels brand from Lindner Hotels AG, for which Hyatt has entered into a strategic collaboration with in 2022, consisting of six lifestyle hotels and over 1,000 rooms in central city locations across Germany.

In August 2024, Hyatt announced the planned acquisition of Standard International, an upscale boutique hotel operator, for $150 million, with up to an additional $185 million over time as additional properties enter the portfolio. The acquisition consists of 21 open hotels and more than 30 future properties under The Standard, Bunkhouse Hotels, Peri Hotels, The StandardX, and The Manner brands. With the transaction, Hyatt will form a new dedicated lifestyle group, managing all lifestyle brands and operations led by Standard International's Executive Chairman Amar Lalvani.

Hyatt acquired Standard International in August 2024.

That same month, Hyatt Regency Orlando, one of the region's largest convention hotels, was sold for $1.02 billion to Los Angeles-based Ares Management and Houston-based Rida Development — the nation's highest hotel sale in 2024. The sale of the 1,641-room hotel at 9801 International Drive came to about $622,000 per guest room.

In 2025, Hyatt closed on the sale of the real estate portfolio acquired from Playa Hotels & Resorts for $1.98 billion.

== Brands ==
Hyatt organizes its global portfolio across five primary brand categories:

=== Luxury ===
- Grand Hyatt
- Park Hyatt
- Alila
- Miraval
- Atona
- Impression by Secrets
- The Unbound Collection by Hyatt
- Mr & Mrs Smith

=== Classics ===
- Hyatt Regency
- Destination by Hyatt
- Hyatt Centric
- Hyatt Vacation Club
- Hyatt Hotels & Resorts

=== Lifestyle ===
- Andaz
- Thompson Hotels
- The Standard
- Dream Hotels
- The StandardX
- Breathless Resorts & Spas
- Joie de Vivre by Hyatt
- Bunkhouse Hotels
- Me and All Hotels

=== Inclusive ===
- Zoëtry Wellness & Spa Resorts
- Hyatt Ziva
- Hyatt Zilara
- Secrets Resorts & Spas
- Dreams Resorts & Spas
- Hyatt Vivid
- Bahia Principe Hotels & Resorts (Note: Bahia Principe is not owned by Hyatt, but they participate in World of Hyatt.)
- Alua Hotels & Resorts
- Sunscape Resorts & Spas

=== Essentials ===
- Caption by Hyatt
- Unscripted by Hyatt
- Hyatt Place
- Hyatt House
- Hyatt Studios
- Hyatt Select
- UrCove by Hyatt

== Notable properties ==
Grand Hyatt Manila housed inside the Metrobank Center.

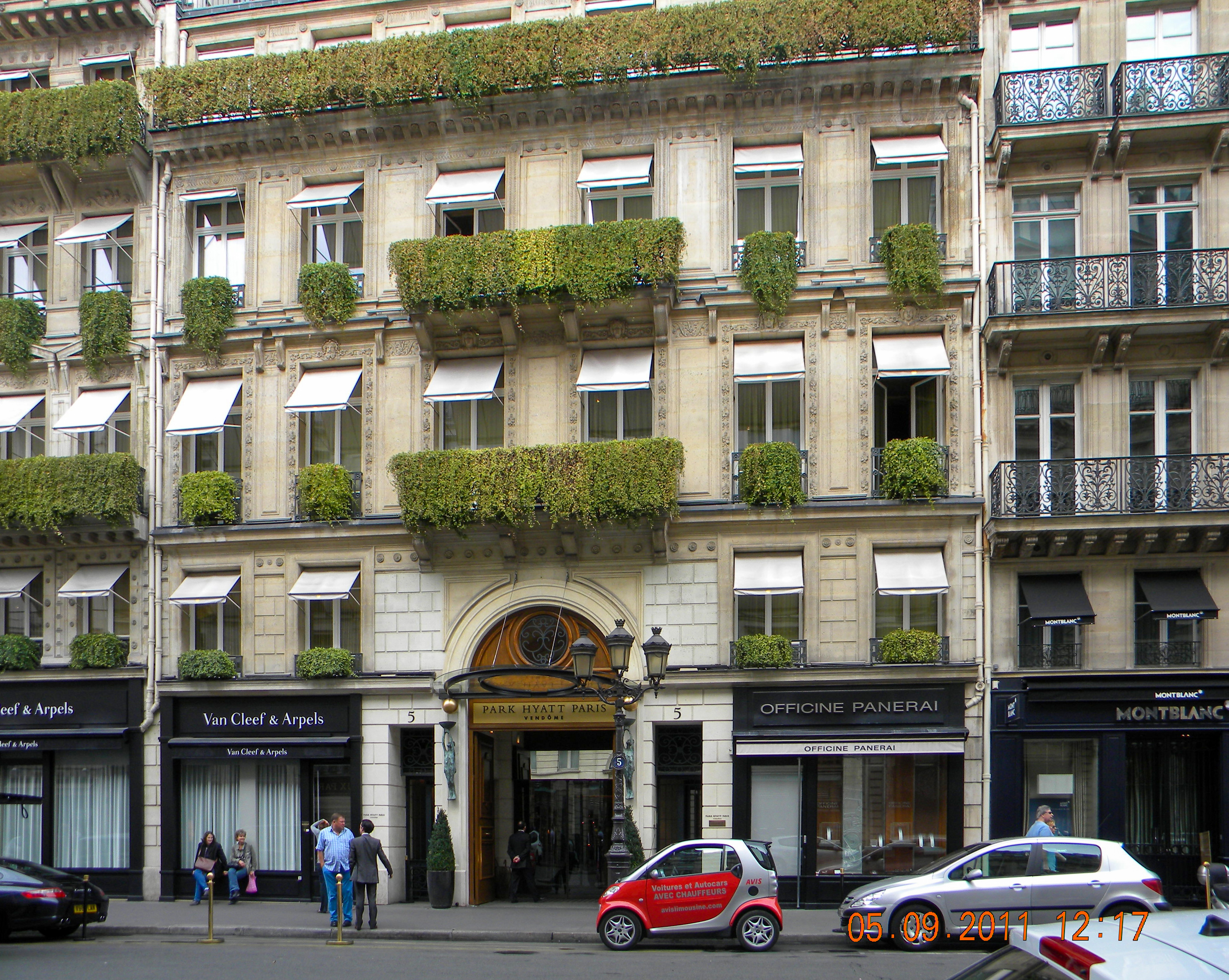
Park Hyatt Paris - Vendôme

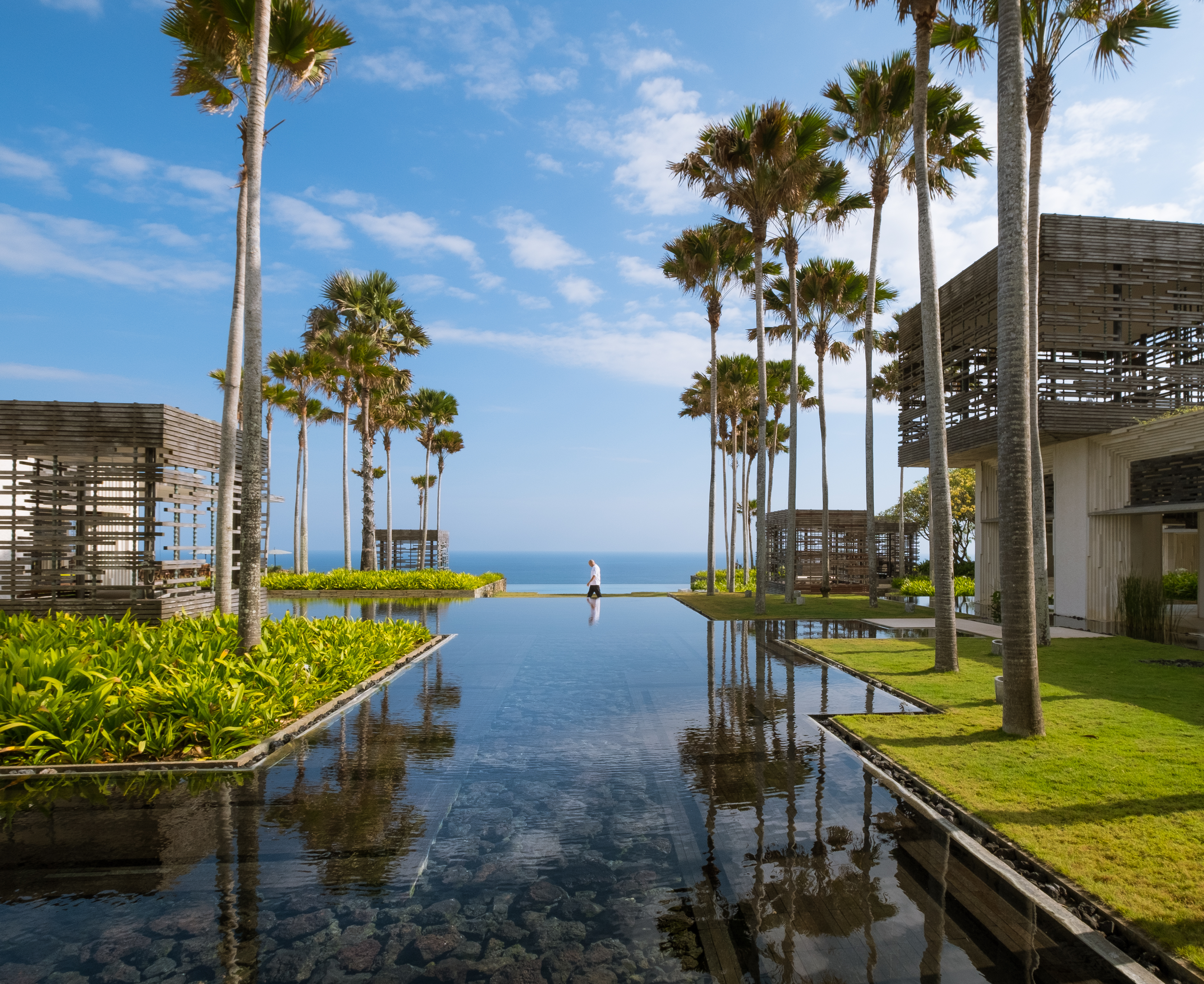
Alila Villas Uluwatu, Bali

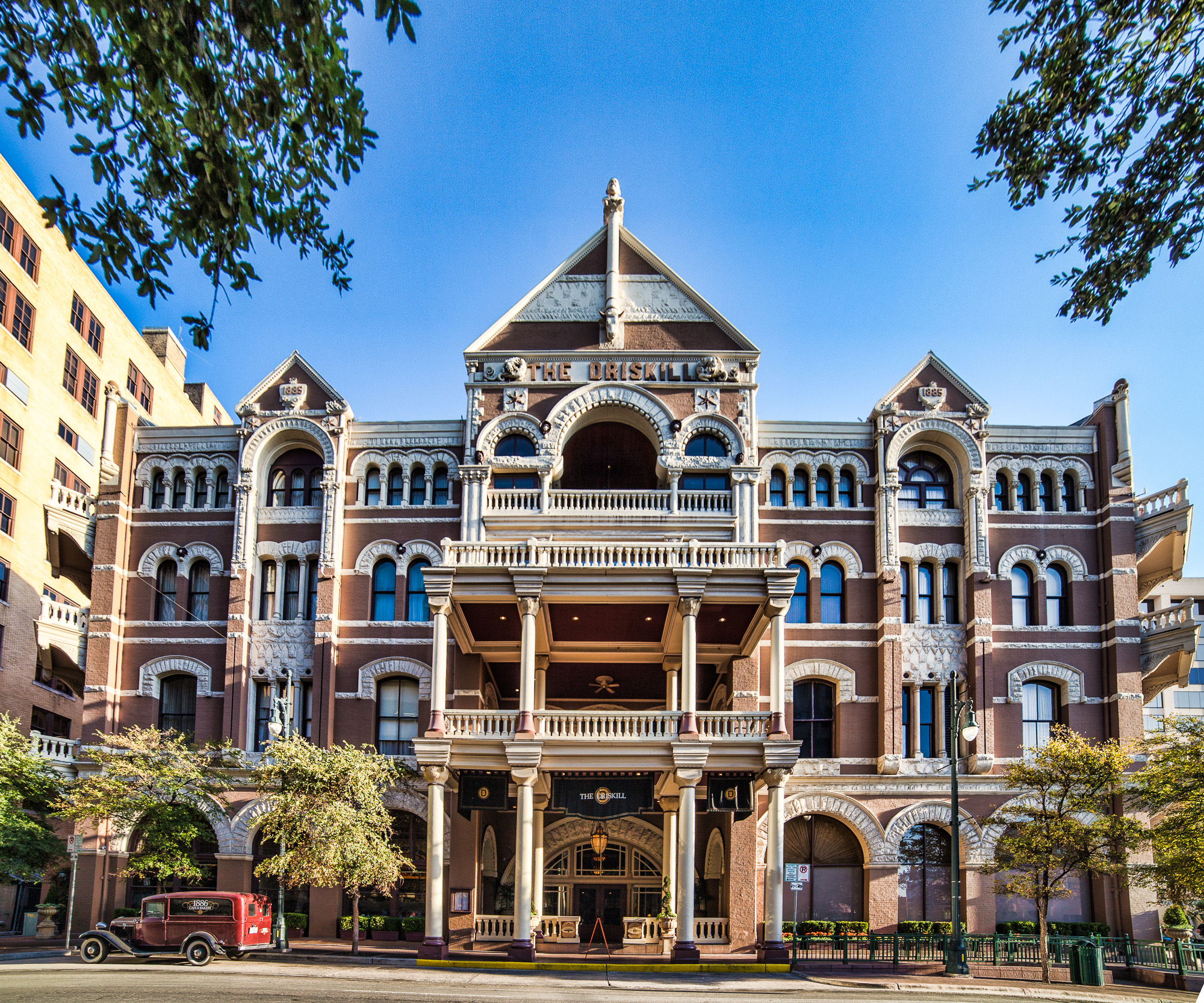
The Driskill in Austin, TX, part of The Unbound Collection by Hyatt

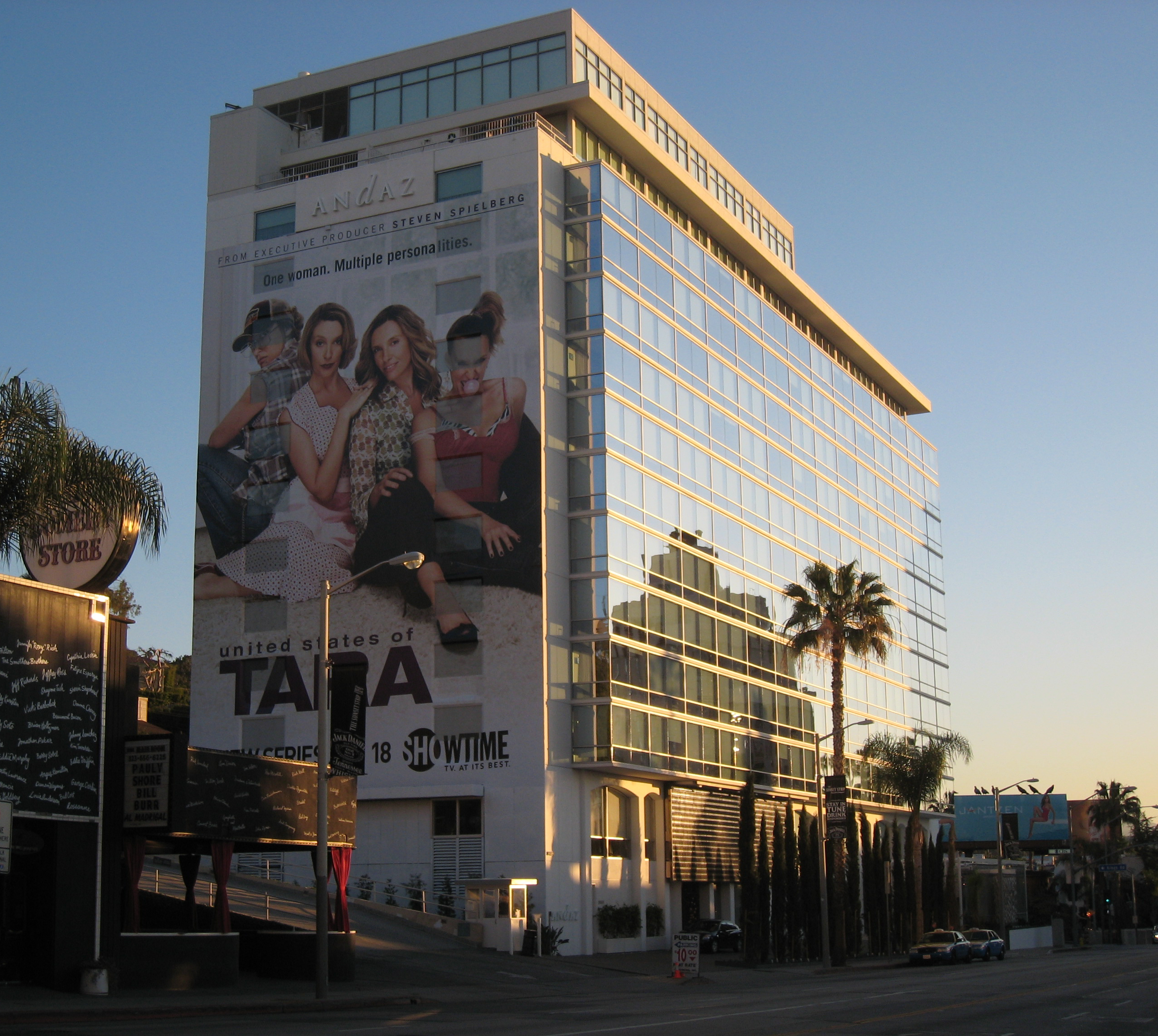
Andaz West Hollywood

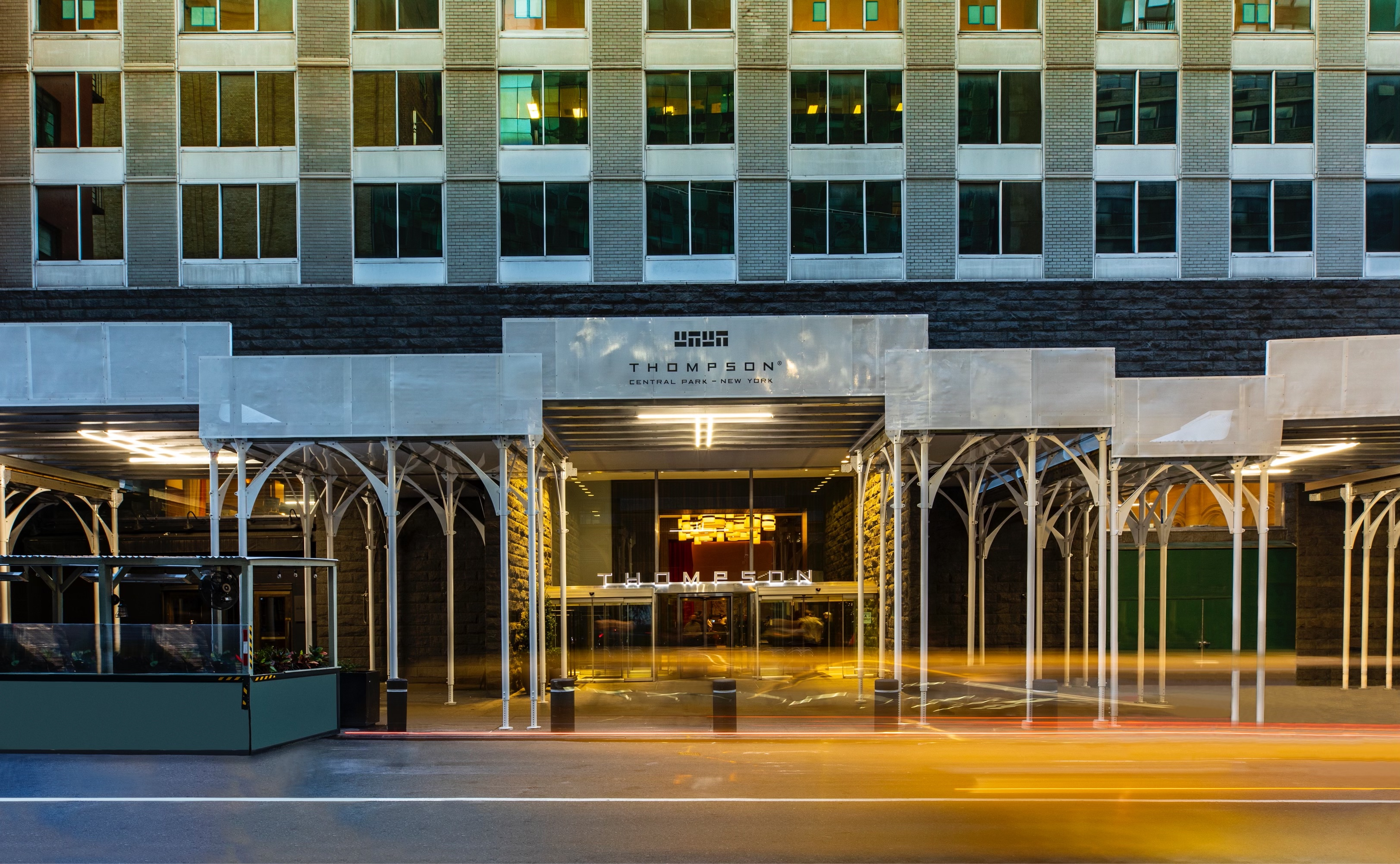
Thompson Central Park - New York

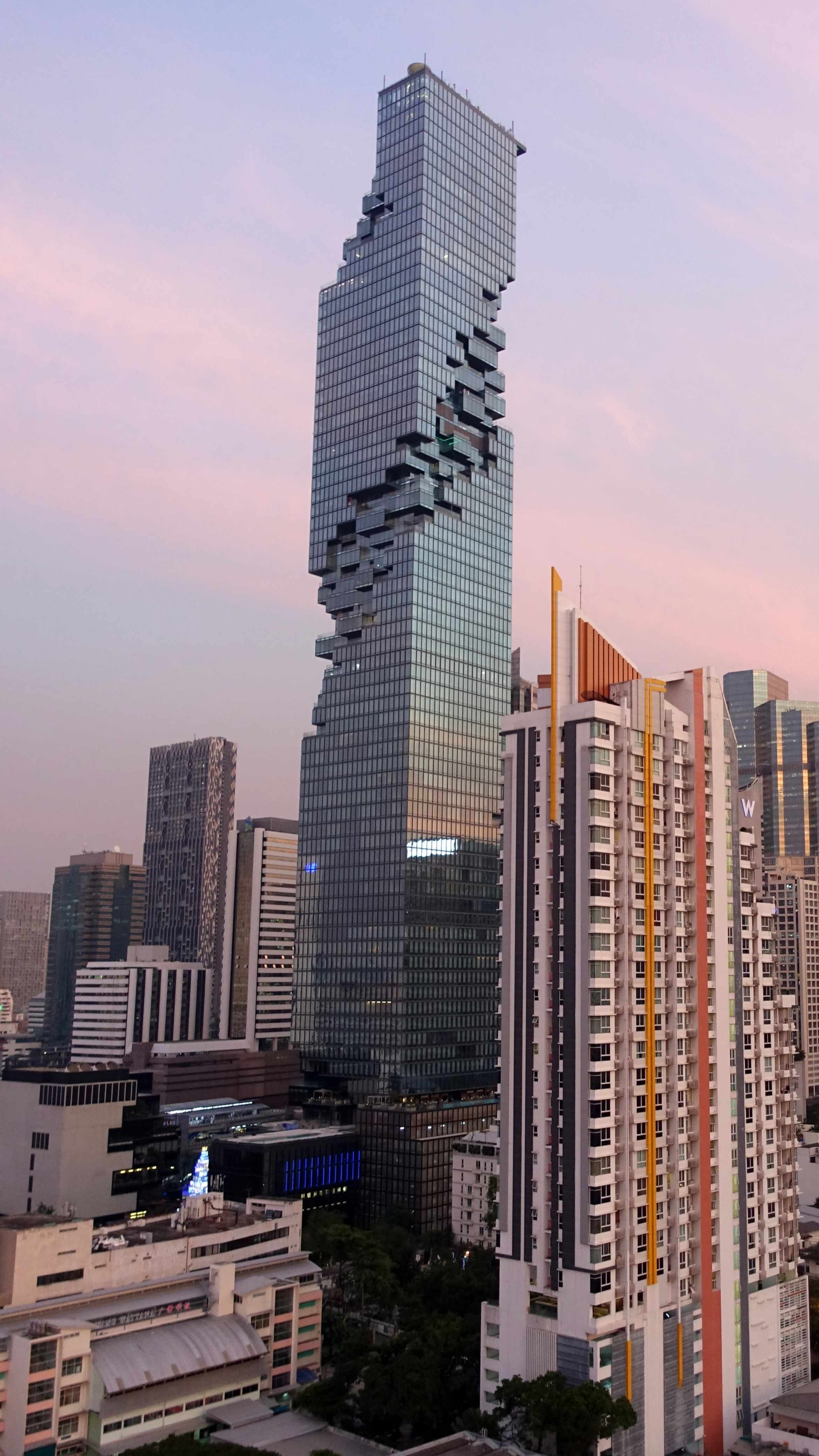
The Standard, Bangkok housed inside the King Power Mahanakhon building

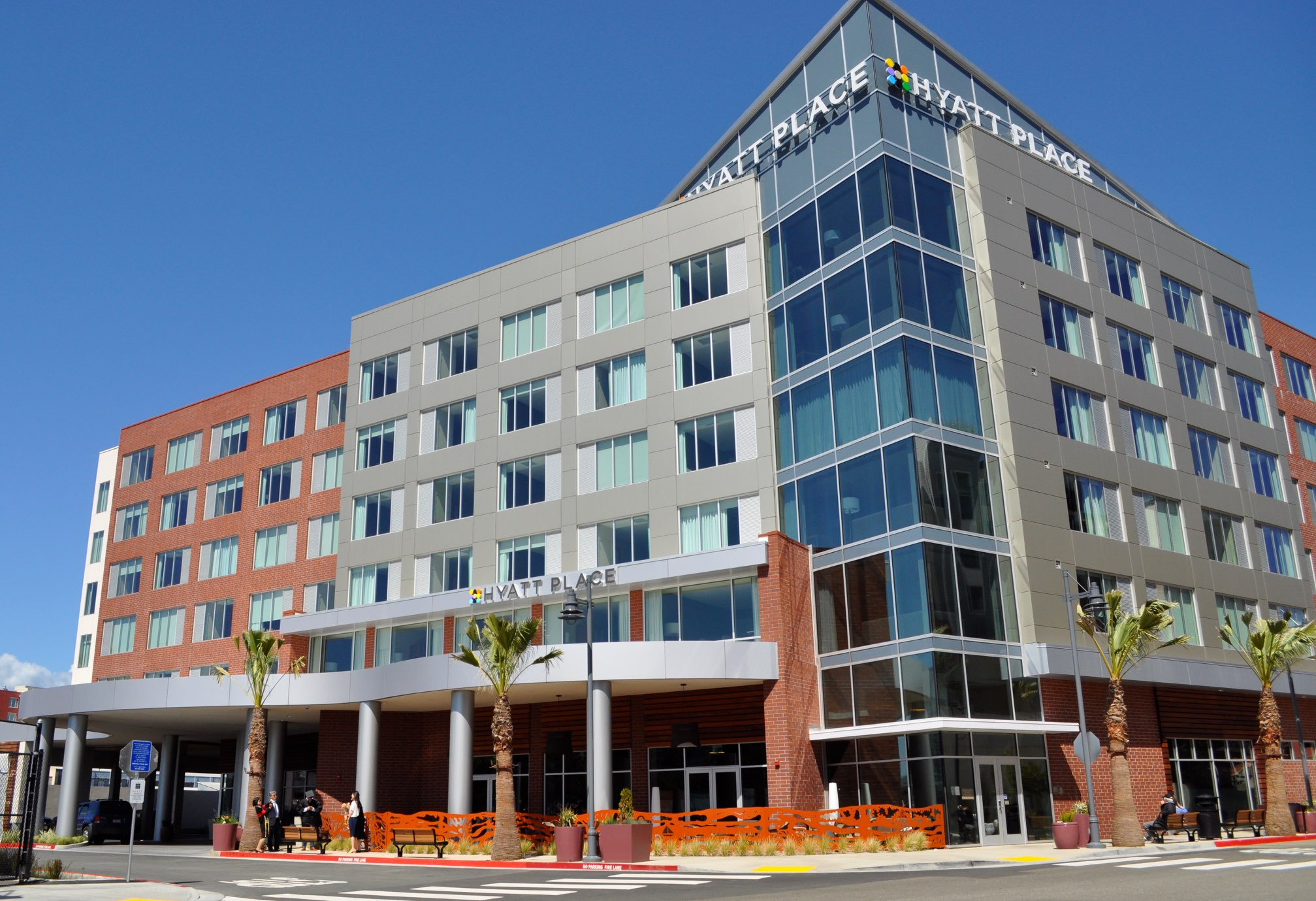
Hyatt Place in Emeryville

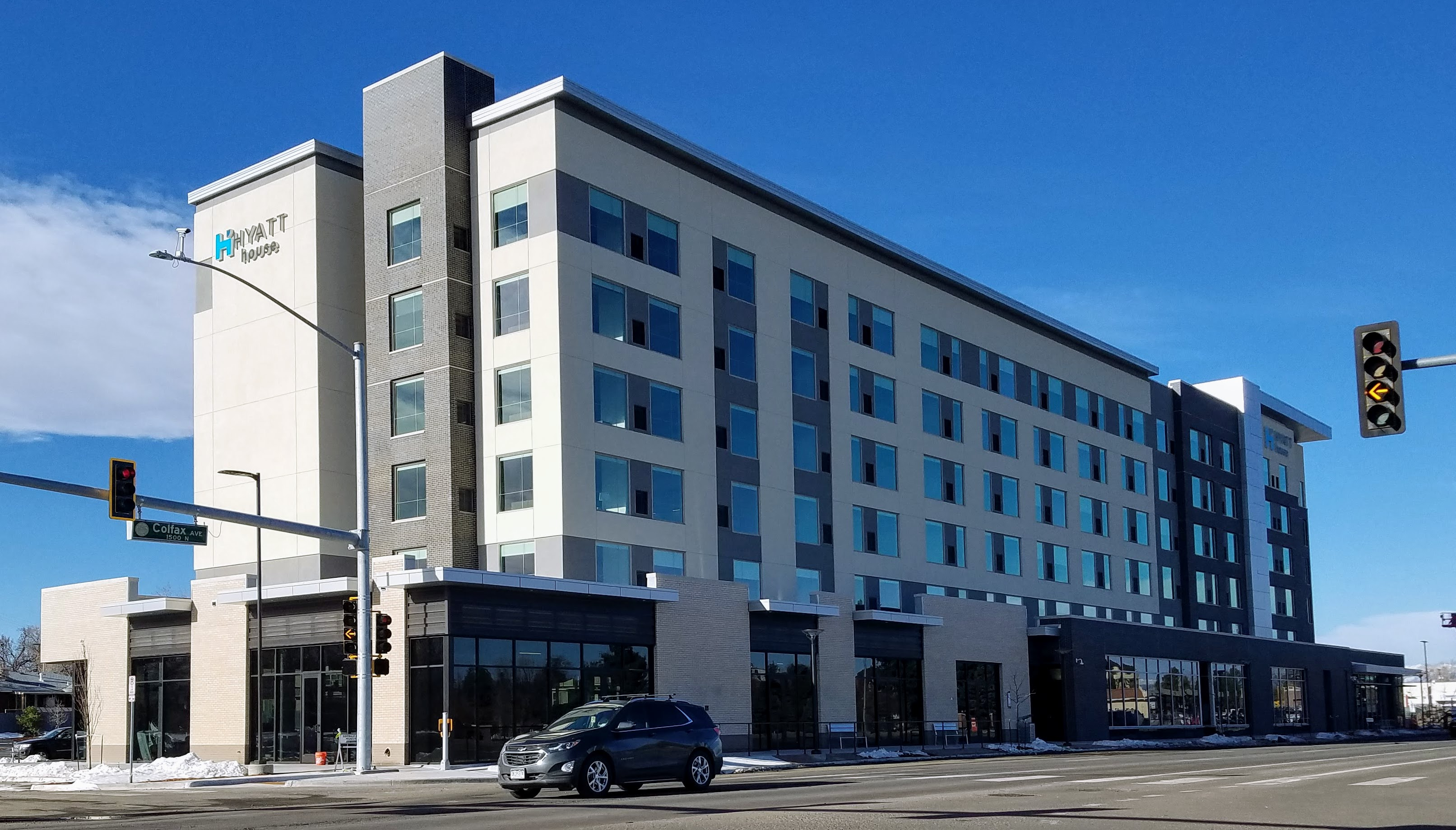
Hyatt House in Denver

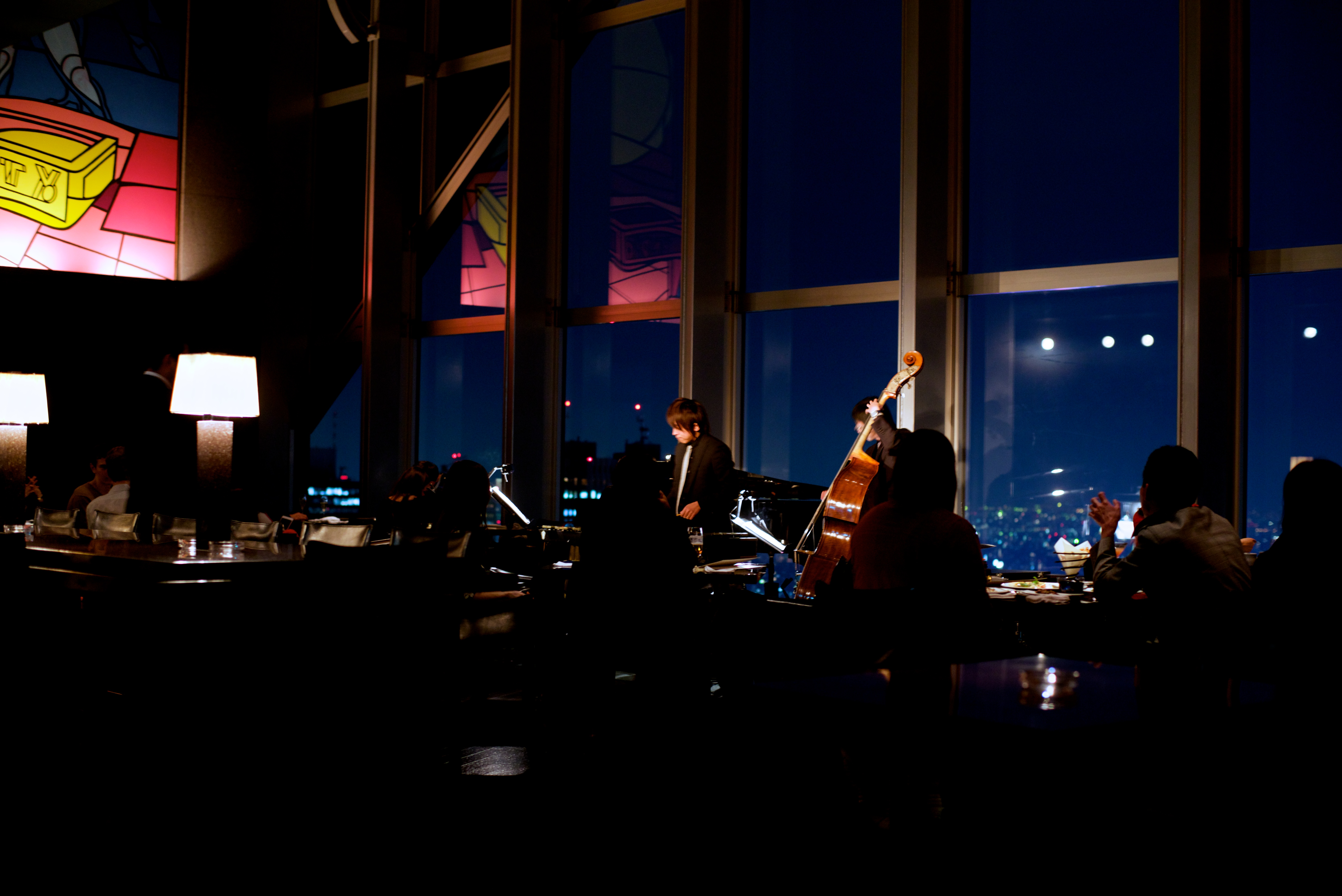
Bar of the Park Hyatt Tokyo that featured in the 2003 film Lost in Translation

- Amman, Jordan: On November 9, 2005, Grand Hyatt Amman was targeted by a series of coordinated terrorist attacks along with a Radisson SAS and a Days Inn hotel.
- Atlanta, United States: The Hyatt Regency Atlanta, the first Hyatt Regency hotel, was built in 1967 as the Regency Hyatt House, and was the first contemporary atrium hotel in the world. As of 2025, it was the only major downtown Atlanta hotel with a front drive on Peachtree Street. Architect John Portman designed the building.
- Austin, United States: The Driskill is the oldest operating hotel in Austin, Texas, and a member of Historic Hotels of America.
- Baguio, Philippines: The Hyatt Terraces Baguio Hotel collapsed after a July 16, 1990, earthquake.
- Bali, Indonesia: Hyatt operates seven hotels on the Indonesian island of Bali: a Grand Hyatt, a Hyatt Regency, an Andaz, and four Alilas (Hyatt Hotels is a JV partner in P.T. Wynncor Bali, the company that owns the first three mentioned hotels).
  - Hyatt Regency Bali, formerly Bali Hyatt, opened in 1973 as one of the first foreign-branded hotels on the island, and remains an important landmark in the Sanur area. Following a five-year-long renovation, it was rebranded as a Hyatt Regency in 2018.
  - Grand Hyatt Bali, opened in Nusa Dua resort complex in 1991 as the largest hotel in Bali at the time, featuring 630 rooms.
- Bangkok, Thailand: The Grand Hyatt Erawan opened in 1991, replacing the government-owned Erawan Hotel at the Ratchaprasong Intersection in the modern-day city center. It is home to the Erawan Shrine, which is popular among wish makers.
- Beijing, China: The Grand Hyatt Beijing opened in 2001, followed by the Park Hyatt Beijing in 2008.
- Birmingham, United Kingdom: The Hyatt Regency Birmingham opened in 1990.
- Burlingame, United States: The Burlingame Hyatt House, the first Hyatt built by the Pritzkers, opened in 1959 near San Francisco International Airport; in 1988 it was demolished and replaced with the Hyatt Regency San Francisco Airport.
- Cairo, Egypt: The Grand Nile Tower Hotel was operated as the Grand Hyatt Cairo from 2003 to 2011, when Hyatt pulled out of the country as a result of the 2011 Egyptian revolution (though it ultimately returned to Egypt in 2021, with the opening of Hyatt Regency Cairo West).
- Carlsbad, United States: The Aviara, opened in 2010, is a Forbes Five Star & AAA Five Diamond resort.
- Casablanca, Morocco: The Hyatt Regency Casablanca, located in the Old Medina of Casablanca, joined Hyatt in the 1980s, having previously been operated as an independent hotel.
- Chicago, United States: With 2,019 rooms, the Hyatt Regency Chicago is the seventh-largest hotel in the world, with the largest freestanding bar in the world. The hotel is known for views of the Chicago River and nearby attractions.
- Dallas, United States: The Hyatt Regency Dallas, built in 1978, is most notable for its association with the Dallas landmark Reunion Tower. Originally freestanding, the base of the tower was integrated into the ground floor of the hotel after an expansion project in 1998.
- Dubai, United Arab Emirates:
  - The Hyatt Regency Dubai, opened in 1980, is the first Hyatt property in the United Arab Emirates.
  - The Grand Hyatt Dubai has 682 rooms, making it the largest hotel in Dubai at the time of its 2003 opening.
- Dushanbe, Tajikistan: The Hyatt Regency Dushanbe, opened in 2009, is Tajikistan's first Hyatt property, as well as the first hotel managed by a Western company following the dissolution of the Soviet Union.
- Biarritz, France: Hôtel du Palais Biarritz – The Unbound Collection by Hyatt. The historic 19th-century seaside palace was chosen as the host venue for the 45th G7 Summit in August 2019, where world leaders including the US president and UK Prime Minister held bilateral meetings.
- Ho Chi Minh City, Vietnam: The Park Hyatt Saigon, which opened in 2005, is the first property of Hyatt in Vietnam. Located at Lam Sơn Square, a plaza surrounding the Saigon Opera House in District 1. This site was previously home to the Brinks Hotel, which was used by the United States Army officers and was bombed by the Viet Cong in 1964.
- Hong Kong: The Grand Hyatt Hong Kong is the Asian flagship of Hyatt International. The Hyatt Regency Hong Kong, Sha Tin and Hyatt Regency Hong Kong are also five-star hotels in Hong Kong.
- Jacksonville, United States: The Hyatt Regency Jacksonville opened in 2001 under the Adam's Mark brand. Ownership of the riverfront hotel changed along with the name in 2005. With 966 rooms, it is the largest hotel in North Florida.
- Jakarta, Indonesia:
  - Grand Hyatt Jakarta, opened in 1991, is adjacent to Plaza Indonesia. It is one of four hotels that surround the landmark Selamat Datang Monument, alongside Hotel Indonesia Kempinski Jakarta, Pullman Jakarta Thamrin CBD, and Mandarin Oriental, Jakarta.
  - Park Hyatt Jakarta, opened in 2022, is touted as the first "six-star" hotel in Jakarta. It is located in Menteng, a historically affluent district of the city.
- Kansas City, United States: The Hyatt Regency Kansas City was the site of one of the worst hotel disasters in U.S. history. On July 17, 1981, two of the three skybridges that traversed the hotel's lobby collapsed during a tea dance. The walkways were packed with people when a structural failure occurred, causing one bridge, which was hung from the bridge above it, to pull both bridges loose from the ceiling and collapse. The accident killed 114 people and injured over 200. The hotel was later renamed the Hyatt Regency Crown Center, and is currently operated by Sheraton.
- Kochi, India: Grand Hyatt Kochi opened in 2018 is the first Grand Hyatt Hotel in South India.
- Kota Kinabalu, Malaysia: Hyatt Regency Kinabalu, opened in 1979 was Hyatt's first hotel in Malaysia and the oldest international-branded hotel in the city.
- London, United Kingdom: Andaz London Liverpool Street, built in 1884. Formerly known as the Great Eastern Hotel, it was the only hotel in the City of London from 1884 until the 1980s.
- Los Angeles, United States:
  - Hollywood: The Continental Hyatt House (now Andaz West Hollywood)
  - Century Plaza Hotel, operated by Hyatt from 2006 to 2016, was restored in 2021 as the Fairmont Century Plaza.
- Maldives: Park Hyatt Maldives Hadahaa, located in Huvadhu Atoll, has developed a reputation for being one of the most exorbitant and exclusive resorts in the country, on account of its remoteness from the capital Malé (a one and a half hour paid plane and speedboat transfers are required to reach the place). It was rebranded in 2011 from Alila Maldives, which had opened two years prior; in 2022, Alila opened another resort, Alila Kothaifaru Maldives, in the Northern Maalhosmadulu Atoll.
- Manila, Philippines: The Grand Hyatt Manila is located in the Metrobank Center, the first supertall building in the Philippines (318m).
- Mumbai, India: Grand Hyatt Hotel, Mumbai was designed by Chicago's Lohan Associates and opened in 2004.
  - In June 2021, the Hyatt Regency Mumbai closed, due to nonfunding for salary payment or operational expenses by Asian Hotels (West) Ltd., the owner of Hyatt Regency Mumbai.
- New Delhi, India: Hyatt Regency Delhi is a luxury hotel in New Delhi, India, built in 1983.
- New Orleans, United States: During Hurricane Katrina (August 23–31, 2005), the Hyatt Regency New Orleans received significant damage as almost all of its windows were blown out and the bottom floor was torn apart by flood damage. The hotel is located in the Central Business District and reopened October 19, 2011.
- New York City, United States: The Grand Hyatt New York, opened in 1980, was the first Grand Hyatt hotel and was the first major real estate development of Donald Trump, in partnership with Hyatt. The partnership deteriorated into a tangle of lawsuits, and the Pritzkers bought off Trump's share in 1996. The structure, built in 1919, is currently named the Hyatt Grand Central New York and is set for demolition and replacement.
- Oyama, Japan: Fuji Speedway Hotel (2022), on the premises of the Fuji Speedway motor racing circuit.
- Phoenix, United States: On Mother's Day, May 9, 2021, a shooting at Hyatt Regency Phoenix left one person dead and seven injured.
- San Francisco, United States: The Hyatt Regency San Francisco formerly housed a rooftop revolving restaurant called Equinox, offering 360-degree views of the city and the bay. The restaurant became a club for Hyatt loyalty members only and no longer rotates. The hotel was sold for close to $200 million to Dune Capital Management and DiNapoli Capital Partners in January 2007, about $250,000 per room.
- Seattle, United States: Hyatt Regency Seattle is the largest hotel in the Pacific Northwest, with 1,260 rooms.
  - Thompson Seattle opened in 2016.
- Singapore: Grand Hyatt Singapore opened in 1971 as the Hyatt Regency and with over 700 rooms, was also the company's largest hotel at the time.
- St. Helena, United States: Alila Napa Valley was Hyatt's 1,000th hotel worldwide.
- Taipei, Taiwan: Grand Hyatt Taipei opened in 1990 as the "first international luxury hotel" in the country.
- Tehran, Iran: The Parsian Azadi Hotel was opened as the Hyatt Crown Tehran in 1978, but Hyatt was forced to pull out after only a few months of operation, due to the Iranian Revolution. It was later reopened as an independent hotel.
- Tokyo, Japan: The Park Hyatt Tokyo is the second-tallest building in Shinjuku, Tokyo. It was the filming location of the 2003 film Lost in Translation.
- Zanzibar, Tanzania: Park Hyatt Zanzibar is the first Park Hyatt hotel in Africa. It is located in Stone Town, a UNESCO World Heritage Site, and occupies a historic palace known as the Mambo Msiige.

== Partnerships ==
In 2013, Hyatt partnered with MGM Resorts International in bringing 12 MGM properties in Las Vegas to Hyatt booking channels, as well as in-depth collaborations with each other's loyalty program. The partnership ended in 2023 when MGM partnered with Marriott International instead.

In 2018, Hyatt began partnering with Small Luxury Hotels of the World, which allowed World of Hyatt members to earn and redeem points during their stays at participating SLH properties. The partnership has since ceased in 2024 following Hyatt's acquisition of Mr & Mrs Smith, a direct booking platform of luxury hotels.

In 2022, Hyatt entered into an exclusive collaboration agreement with Lindner Hotels AG, a German hotel operator, in bringing more than 30 hotels across seven European countries into Hyatt's portfolio under the JdV by Hyatt brand. In 2024, Hyatt purchased the Me And All Hotels brand from Lindner.

== Loyalty program ==
Hyatt operates a loyalty program called World of Hyatt, which replaced Gold Passport on March 1, 2017. This program includes membership tiers of base members, Discoverists, Explorists, and Globalists. The program offers Hyatt members benefits such as room upgrades and complimentary breakfast, based on how many nights they stayed in Hyatt-affiliated hotels or how much they spend in Hyatt properties.

== Recognition ==
Fortune magazine ranked Hyatt #32 on its list of "America's Best Companies to Work For" in 2019, rising to #16 in 2021. The Human Rights Campaign (HRC) has awarded the company 100% in the HRC Equality Index for more than ten years, last in 2020.

== Sustainability ==
=== Animal welfare ===
In 2011, Hyatt announced that it would source 100% cage-free eggs by 2025.

== Controversies ==
=== Iditarod sponsorship ===
Hyatt has come under pressure from People for the Ethical Treatment of Animals (PETA), thanks to The Wildbirch Hotel - JdV by Hyatt becoming a corporate sponsor of the Iditarod, an Alaskan dogsledding race that has lost multiple participants and sponsorships over the years. More than a dozen companies, including ExxonMobil, Alaska Airlines, and Millennium Hotels and Resorts, have dropped their Iditarod sponsorships after learning about the conditions endured by dogs during and between races. As of October 2026, more than 40,000 people have made pleas for Hyatt to reconsider The Wildbirch Hotel’s Sponsorship. Hoplamazian has not released a statement on Hyatt’s sponsorship. According to PETA, more than 150 dogs have died while running the Iditarod, and that number does not include dogs they say are killed during the off-season because they aren't fast or fit enough.
