= Andaz London Liverpool Street by Hyatt =

Hotel in the City of London

Coordinates: 51.5173°N 0.0811°W

Andaz London Liverpool Street
- Historic Logo

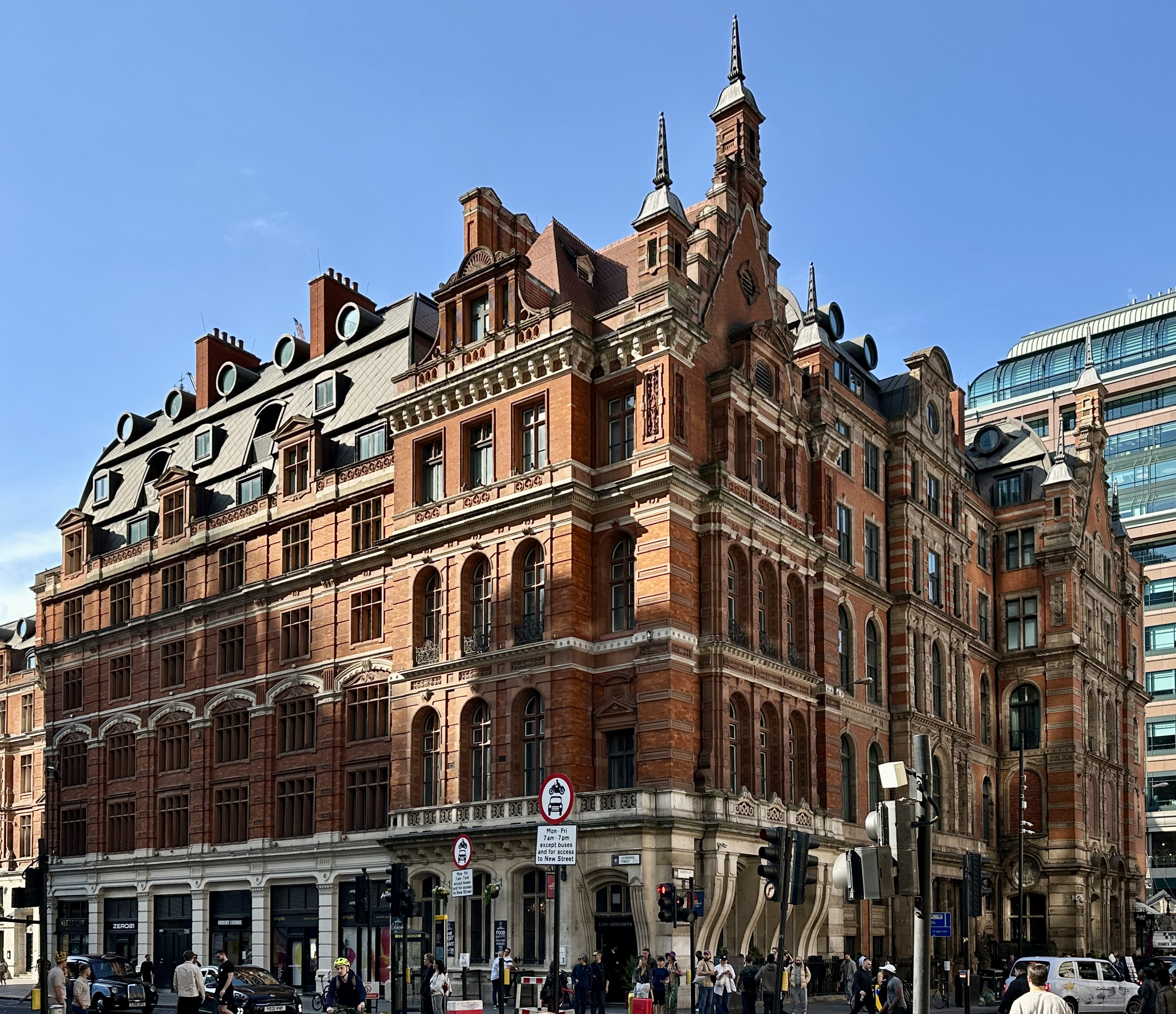
- Former names: Great Eastern Hotel, Liverpool Street Hotel

General information
- Location: London, EC2
- Opening: 1884
- Owner: Hyatt Hotels Corporation

Design and construction
- Architects: Edward Middleton Barry, Charles Barry, Jr.

Other information
- Number of rooms: 267
- Number of suites: 15
- Number of restaurants: 5

Website
- http://andazlondonliverpoolstreet.com

Andaz London Liverpool Street is a 5 star hotel in the Bishopsgate Without area of the City of London; situated immediately south of Liverpool Street station, originally built as the Great Eastern Hotel in 1884. The building underwent extensive renovation and expansion between 1899 and 1901 and again in 2000, when it was co-owned by Terence Conran. Hyatt has owned the hotel since 2006, operating it under the Andaz brand.

The hotel has been listed Grade II on the National Heritage List for England since March 1993.

== History ==
=== Early years ===
From 1247 to 1676, the site was occupied by the Priory of St Mary of Bethlehem, which became England's first hospital for the mentally ill, the Bethlehem Royal Hospital, known colloquially as 'Bedlam'.

The Great Eastern Hotel was built by the Great Eastern Railway to serve its London terminus Liverpool Street Station. It opened in May 1884 and was designed by Charles Barry, Jr. and his son Charles Edward Barry and built by Lucas Brothers. It was expanded in 1901, to designs by Robert William Edis, with interior fittings by Maple & Co. The extension included a suite of reception rooms known as the Abercorn Rooms. Lord Claud Hamilton, son of the Duke of Abercorn was director of the railway, later its chairman.

The hotel's clientele included business people who could avoid City traffic by staying near the railway station. A daily supply of fresh sea water for bathing was brought in by train. The building is notable also for its inclusion of two Masonic Temples—an Egyptian temple in the basement and a Grecian temple on the first floor. Caledonian Lodge No 134, an English lodge for Scottish Masons in London, met at the Great Eastern from 1920 to 1947.

=== Recent history ===
By the second half of the twentieth century, the Great Eastern Hotel was in need of renovations. Following the redesign and improvement of the adjoining railway station in the 1980s,

In 1996, Railtrack sold the hotel to a consortium including Terence Conran. The hotel was closed and restored at a cost of £65 million by Jasper Conran's Conran Holdings and Wyndham International in a 50/50 partnership. Manser Associates served as the architects and Conran Design Group created new interiors in the historic building. A new lobby was created by removing several existing guest rooms, and the capacity was increased to 267 rooms by reusing attic space. The design was informed by the practice of daylighting, realised by providing lightwells in the ceiling of the lobby and in the main dining room and by providing as many views of London as possible in the bedrooms. The hotel reopened on 2 March 2000, managed by Wyndham.

On 14 March 2006, the hotel was sold by Conran Holdings and the Blackstone Group for £150 million to Global Hyatt Corporation and JER Partners, which rebranded it as Andaz London Liverpool Street on November 16, 2007.

In November 2022, plans were announced for a £1.5 billion redevelopment of the entire station complex, designed by Swiss architects Herzog & de Meuron. The plans would have turned the original Great Eastern Hotel building into part of the station, and would have moved the Andaz Hotel business into one of two new adjacent towers. The plans caused significant controversy among preservationists. In November 2024, the plans were significantly revised, due to the objections.

== Facilities ==
The building, including the Abercorn Rooms, is of red brick with stucco and stone ground floor and mildly classical style dressings. Of the 267 rooms, 15 are suites. Seven bars and restaurants are available on the property, as well as a fitness centre and steam room.

== In literature ==
The Great Eastern is where vampire hunter Abraham Van Helsing stays during his first visit to London in Bram Stoker's Gothic fiction horror novel Dracula. The narrator of W. G. Sebald's Austerlitz meets the titular character in the bar of the Great Eastern after a twenty-year separation; Austerlitz recounts details of the building including the Grecian temple.
