= Mr & Mrs Smith (brand) =

Chain of luxury and boutique hotels owned by Hyatt

- Type: Subsidiary
- Industry: Travel; Hospitality
- Founded: 2003; 23 years ago
- Founders: Tamara Lohan; James Lohan
- Headquarters: London, United Kingdom
- Number of locations: 1,500+
- Parent: Hyatt Hotels Corporation
- Website: www.mrandmrssmith.com

Mr & Mrs Smith is a London-based chain of hotels owned by Hyatt. Founded in 2003 as an independent travel publisher and club, the service features a curated collection of over 1,500 hand-picked and anonymously reviewed boutique and luxury hotels and villas worldwide.

In April 2023, hospitality group Hyatt acquired the company for £53 million ($66.6 million USD).

== History ==
=== Foundation and early years (2002–2019) ===
The concept for Mr & Mrs Smith originated in 2002 when co-founders Tamara and James Lohan experienced a disappointing stay at a poorly vetted health retreat. Frustrated by the discrepancy between hotel marketing and actual guest experiences, the couple began compiling a guidebook of romantic boutique hotels.

To fund the initial print run of 10,000 copies, the co-founders remortgaged their home. The first book, Mr & Mrs Smith Hotel Collection: UK, published in 2003, became a commercial success, selling over 25,000 copies during its first holiday season. The name "Mr & Mrs Smith" was chosen as a reference to the pseudonyms historically used by couples checking discreetly into hotel rooms in post-war Britain.

As the platform transitioned online, Tamara Lohan served as Chief Technology Officer (CTO) for 18 years, developing its proprietary booking system. The company expanded from a publisher into a digital travel club, launching "Smith24" (a 24/7 global travel concierge service) and guaranteeing perks such as complimentary welcome gifts and price matching for members.

In 2022, Mr & Mrs Smith earned official B Corp certification in recognition of its social and environmental standards.

=== Acquisition by Hyatt (2023–present) ===
On April 28, 2023, Hyatt Hotels Corporation announced an agreement to acquire Mr & Mrs Smith for £53 million in cash. The transaction was finalized in the second quarter of 2023, integrating over 100 Mr & Mrs Smith employees into Hyatt's commercial services division.

The acquisition gave Hyatt direct access to boutique hotel inventory in over 20 countries where Hyatt had previously maintained no physical presence (including Croatia, Fiji, Anguilla, and Iceland). In April 2024, Hyatt officially began integrating the collection into its World of Hyatt loyalty platform, allowing members to earn and redeem points across eligible properties. Co-founders Tamara and James Lohan remained with the business as Chief Executive Officer and Chief Creative Officer respectively.

== Business model ==
Mr & Mrs Smith operates as a curated travel marketplace and loyalty club. Properties listed on the platform are hand-picked by an internal curation team and subjected to anonymous review by guest tastemakers, travel writers, and critics.

The platform generates revenue through booking commissions and premium membership tiers. Basic membership is free, providing access to curated rates and welcome extras, while paid tiers offer enhanced perks and cash-back rewards.
