= Alila Hotels and Resorts =

Indonesian hotel chain

- Founded: 2001
- Founder: Mark Edleson; Franky Tjahyadikarta
- Area served: Asia and North America
- Parent: Hyatt Hotels Corporation
- Website: alilahotels.com

Alila Hotels and Resorts is an upscale hotel chain founded in Indonesia in 2001 and part of Hyatt since 2018. It has properties in Indonesia, the United States, India, Oman, Malaysia, China, and the Maldives.

== History ==
Alila Hotels and Resorts, which translates to "surprise" in Sanskrit, was established in May 2001. The corporation was founded as part of a takeover of two then GHM-managed hotels in Bali, known as The Serai and The Chedi. Following their separation from GHM, the first Alila hotel opened in Jakarta in 2001. Soon after, hotels in Manggis and Ubud also debuted. The corporate headquarters were relocated from Bali to Singapore in 2004.

Alila established a relationship with Commune Hotels, the company behind Joie de Vivre, Thompson, and tommie, in May 2014. Soon after, Commune bought 51% of Alila. Following Commune's merger with Destination Hotels in 2016, the Alila and the other Commune-owned brands were incorporated under the then recently established holding company Two Roads Hospitality. Alila subsequently joined Hyatt in November 2018 as a result of the purchase of Two Roads Hospitality by the Hyatt Hotels Corporation.

== Properties ==
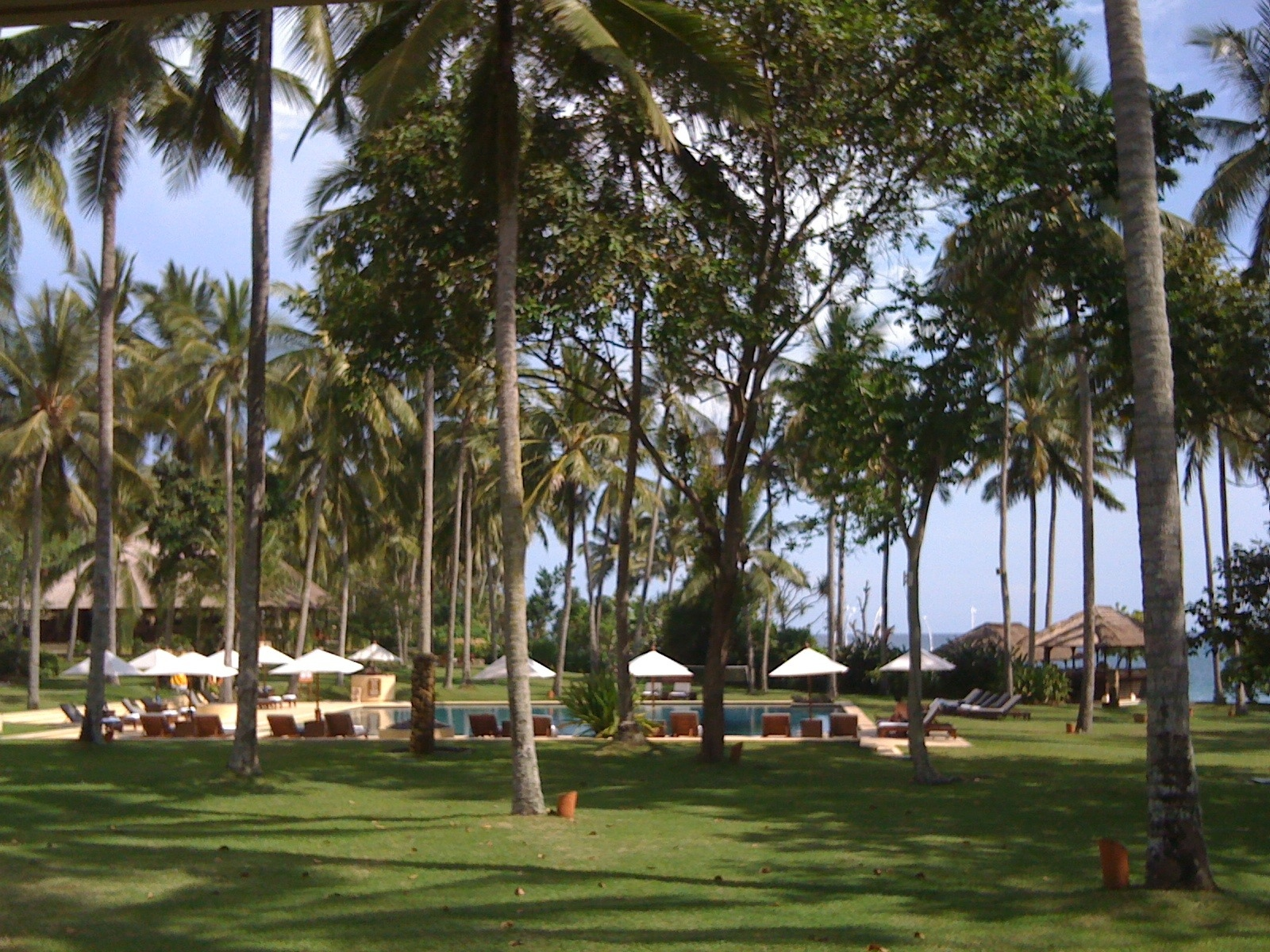
Alila Manggis, Bali

Property	Location	Country	Opened
Alila Bangsar Kuala Lumpur	Kuala Lumpur	Malaysia	2018
Alila Diwa Goa	Goa	India	2009
Alila Fort Bishangarh	Jaipur	India	2017
Alila Hinu Bay	Dhofar	Oman	2021
Alila Jabal Akhdar	Jebel Akhdar	Oman	2014
Alila Kothaifaru Maldives	Northern Maalhosmadulu Atoll	Maldives	2022
Alila Manggis	Karangasem	Indonesia	2001
Alila Marea Beach Resort Encinitas	Encinitas	United States	2021
Alila Napa Valley	Napa Valley	United States	2021
Alila Seminyak	Seminyak	Indonesia	2015
Alila Solo	Surakarta	Indonesia	2015
Alila Ubud	Ubud	Indonesia	2001
Alila Ventana Big Sur	Big Sur	United States	2017
Alila Villas Uluwatu	Uluwatu	Indonesia	2009
Alila Wuzhen	Wuzhen	China	2018
