= Wyndham International =

The company's logo

Wyndham International, previously Patriot American Hospitality, was an American hotel company based in Dallas, Texas.

== History ==
Patriot American Hospitality was formed in April 1995 as a real estate investment trust (REIT) and made its initial public offering in October 1995.

In 1997, Patriot American combined with the parent companies of the Bay Meadows Racetrack in a reverse merger, effectively splitting into two companies under the same ownership: a REIT and an operating company.

In January 1998, Patriot American bought Wyndham Hotel Corporation for $1.3 billion, and changed its operating company's name to Wyndham International.

In June 1998, Patriot American and Wyndham acquired Interstate Hotels, the largest independent hotel operator in the country, for $2.1 billion. Interstate's portfolio included 40 owned-and-operated hotels, most of them in the upscale segment, and 182 other hotels under lease or management. Many of the Interstate hotels were planned to be converted to the Wyndham brand, to strengthen its name recognition.

Later that month, the company acquired the Summerfield Hotel Corporation for $299 million. This acquisition added the all-suite Summerfield Suites and Sierra Suites Hotels brands, with a total of 40 properties, to Wyndham's portfolio.

=== Expansion ===
The firm grew rapidly in the late 1990s, acquiring multiple portfolios of hotels and renaming them Wyndhams. In 1998, the company introduced a short-lived luxury brand, Grand Bay Hotels & Resorts, which would include 11 hotels that the company had acquired over the past few years and would turn Wyndham into a multi-brand hotel operating and ownership organization. The company also included several European properties, including the Great Eastern Hotel in London.

However, the company's rapid growth drained cash and the firm was unable to continue to grow on its own. In March 1999, the group agreed to a $1 billion restructuring when a consortium of private equity firms, including Thomas H. Lee Partners and Apollo Real Estate Advisors, assumed control of the company. As part of this transaction, Patriot and Wyndham merged and dropped their REIT status, forming a single company under the Wyndham International name.

From 1999 to 2004, the firm struggled to pay down debt and was forced to sell off many of the hotels it had acquired in the late 1990s, often at a deep discount in an industry still suffering from the effects of the 9/11 terrorist attacks. The effort to expand, the Grand Bay brand was canceled, and the brand's franchised limited-service offerings, Summerfield Suites and Wyndham Garden Hotels, continued to lose units as hotels converted out of the system. Many of the Summerfield Suites hotels were sold to the Intercontinental Hotels Group and were converted to the Staybridge Suites brand.

=== Sale and breakup ===
In June 2005, Wyndham International agreed to be acquired by the Blackstone Group for $1.4 billion cash plus $1.8 billion of assumed debt. The sale was completed in August 2005.

Wyndham's portfolio at the time of the sale included ownership of 32 hotels, plus management agreements for 29 other properties and franchise agreements for 82 other Wyndham-branded hotels. In the months following the sale, Blackstone transferred 14 of the owned-and-operated hotels to its newly created LXR Luxury Resorts brand, and sold 14 others to Columbia Sussex for $1.4 billion. The Wyndham franchising operation and management business were sold to Cendant in October 2005 for $111 million. The Summerfield Suites brand was sold to Hyatt Hotels in January 2006.
