= The Hyatt 100 =

The Hyatt 100 are a group of housekeepers fired from three Boston-area Hyatt hotels on August 31, 2009. The layoffs drew widespread condemnation from politicians, businesses, and other groups.

== The layoffs ==
On August 31, 2009, 98 housekeepers at three Boston-area Hyatt hotels (the Hyatt Regency Boston, the Hyatt Regency Cambridge, and the Hyatt Harborside at Logan International Airport) were fired and replaced by workers from a Georgia-based temporary agency. The fired housekeepers, some of whom had worked for the Hyatt for more than 20 years, were given no advance notice of the layoffs. They claim that they were asked to train the workers that replaced them under the pretense that these workers could fill in for them when they were sick or on vacation. The housekeepers originally earned around $14–16 per hour, while the replacement workers are paid $8 per hour.

== Hyatt boycott ==
The layoffs generated widespread public outrage. Rallies in support of the fired housekeepers were attended by hundreds of protesters. Governor Deval Patrick of Massachusetts called for state employees to boycott of the Hyatt in response to the layoffs, and Representative Michael Capuano also criticized the layoffs

Other organizations and groups boycotting the Hyatt include the Jewish Labor Committee, the faculty of Emerson College, and the Boston Taxi Drivers Association.

In December 2009, Massachusetts Jobs With Justice voted the Hyatt the Massachusetts Scrooge of the Year in response to the Hyatt layoffs.
