= Bahia Principe =

Hotel chain

Bahia Principe Hotels & Resorts
- Type: Private company
- Industry: Hospitality
- Founded: 1995
- Headquarters: Palma, Spain
- Key people: Pablo Piñero
- Products: Hotels

Bahia Principe Hotels & Resorts is a division of resorts owned by Grupo Piñero, established in 1995 with the opening its first hotel in the town of Rio San Juan on the northern coast of the Dominican Republic.

== Overview ==
The company currently maintains a total of 27 hotels & resorts in: Palma de Mallorca and Tenerife (Spain); Riviera Maya (Mexico); Samaná, La Romana, Punta Cana, and Río San Juan (Dominican Republic); and Runaway Bay (Jamaica). It also keeps travel and tour offices in Argentina, Miami, Florida, Portugal, and Russia.

The resort participates in the UN Initiative for business sustainability. Grupo Piñero releases an annual sustainability report with the results of corporate social responsibility implementation into the resort's agenda.

In March 2026, the chain participated in Hyatt's loyalty program, World of Hyatt, however the brand is not under Hyatt entirely.
