= 150 North Riverside =

Office skyscraper in Chicago, Illinois

150 North Riverside Plaza
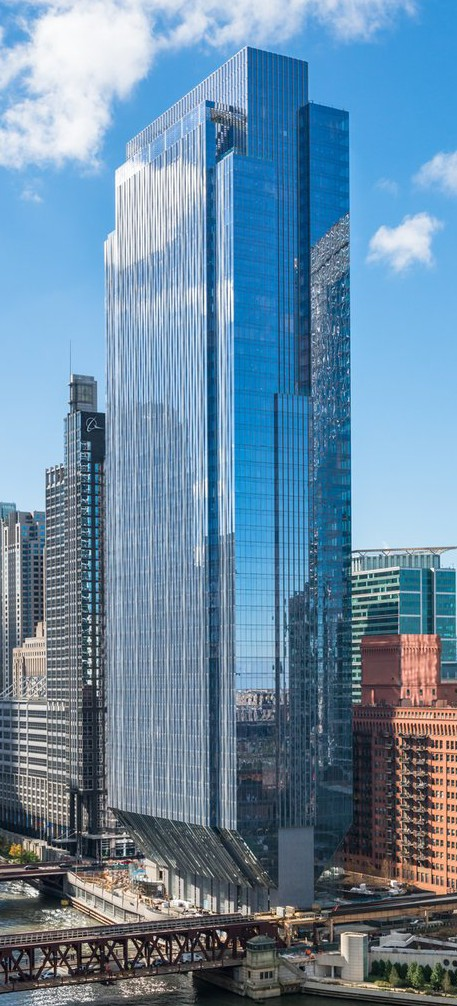
- 150 North Riverside Plaza

General information
- Status: Completed
- Type: Office
- Location: 150 North Riverside Plaza, Chicago, Illinois
- Coordinates: 41.885327°N 87.638531°W
- Construction started: 2015
- Completed: 2017
- Opening: 2017

Height
- Roof: 752 ft (229 m)

Technical details
- Floor count: 54
- Floor area: 111,483 m^{2} (1,199,990 sq ft)
- Lifts/elevators: 22

Design and construction
- Architect: Goettsch Partners
- Developer: Riverside Investment & Development
- Structural engineer: Magnusson Klemencic Associates
- Main contractor: Clark Construction

150 North Riverside Plaza is a skyscraper in Chicago, Illinois, completed in 2017 and anchored by William Blair and Co. The building is 54 stories tall and was designed by Goettsch Partners. The building occupies a two-acre site on the west bank of the Chicago River, whose size and location demanded an unusually small base for the building. The building features 1.2 million square feet (110,000 m^{2}) of leasable office space. Due to its unique superstructure design, it encompasses just 25 percent of the lot. In 2019, the building was given the Chicago Chapter of the American Institute of Architects' highest award for design excellence.

Among the building's tenants is the Hyatt Corporation, who moved their headquarters to the building upon its completion.

== Background ==
As required by the city of Chicago for any new riverfront building, the developer was required to set aside part of the lot size for public park space; 75 percent of the project site is reserved for a public park, amphitheater, and riverwalk. The site is built with air rights over tracks that carry Metra and Amtrak trains into Chicago Union Station. The building has achieved LEED gold and WiredScore Platinum certification.

== Design ==
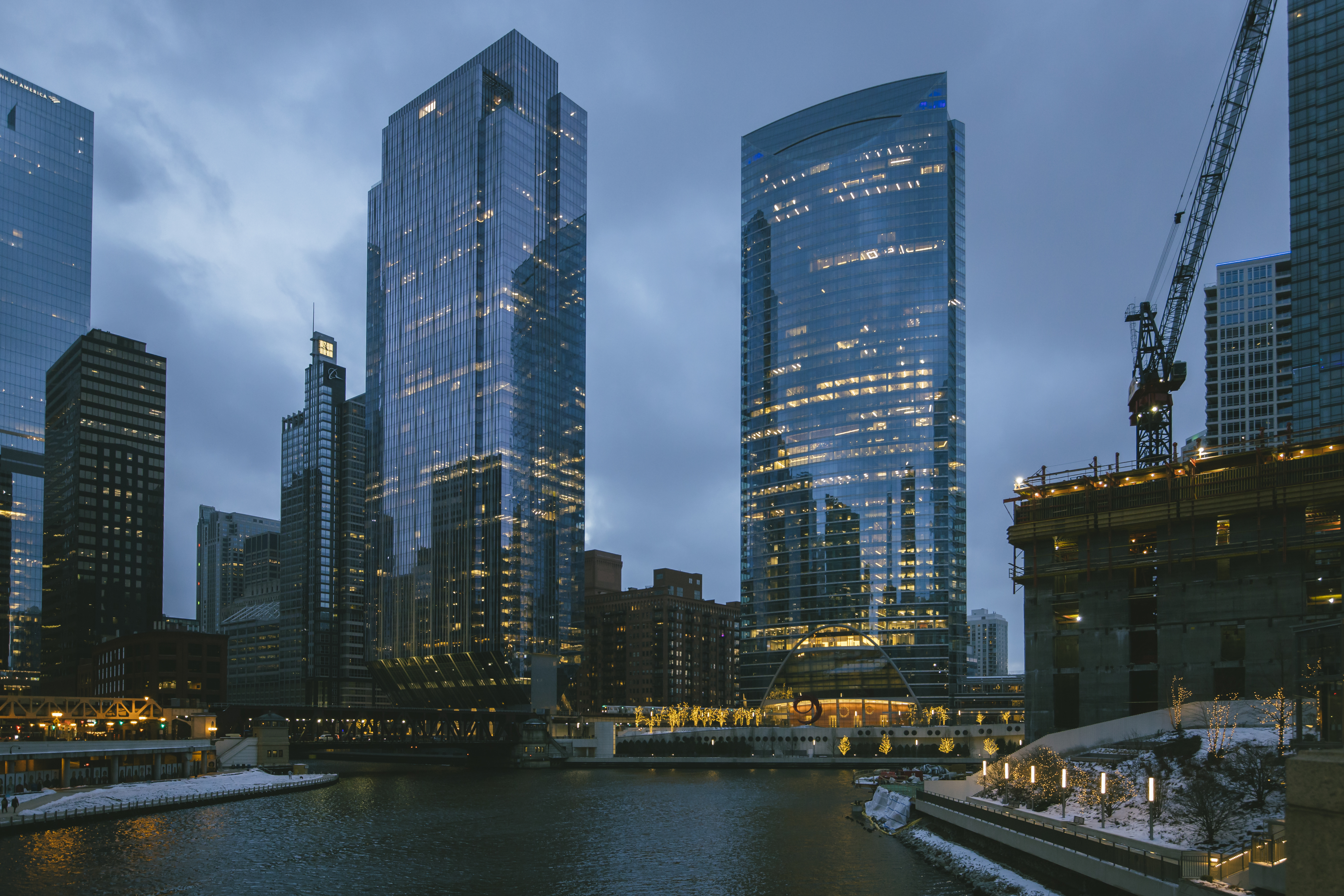
Skyline of Chicago at night, 150 North Riverside visible center-left

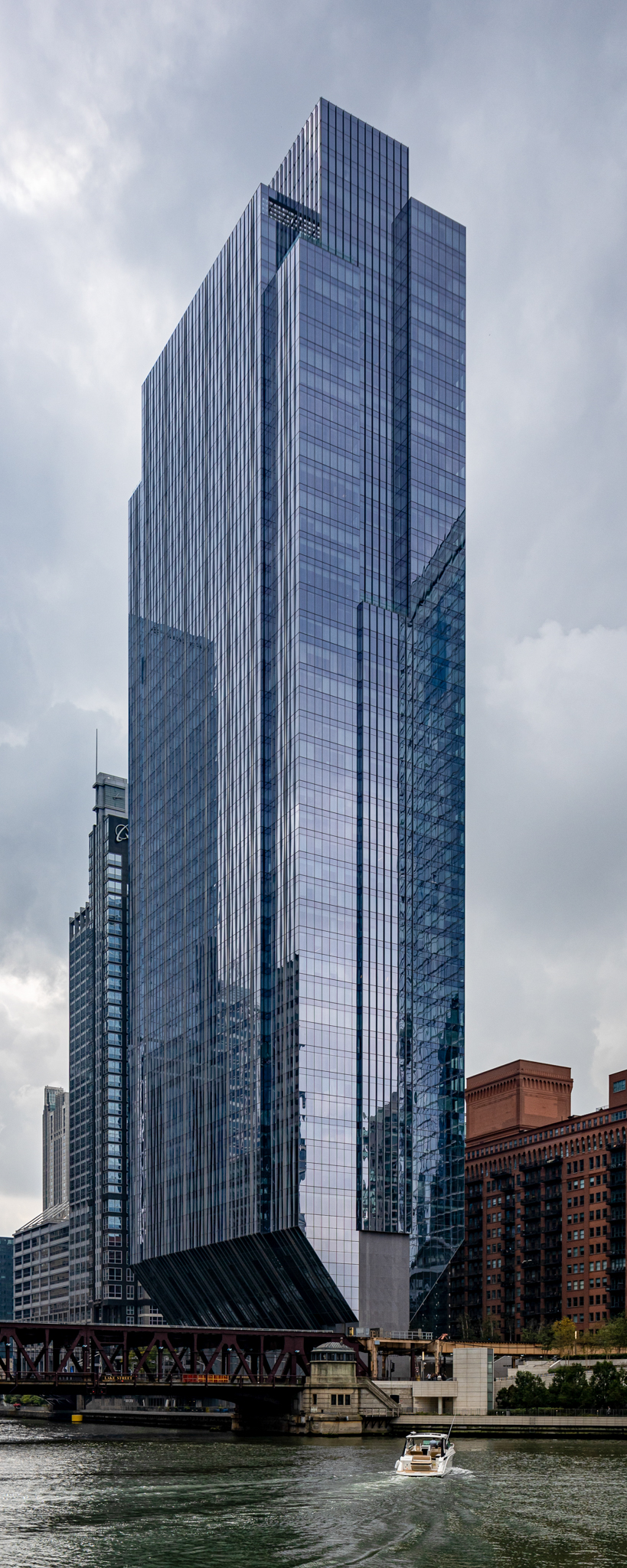
150 North Riverside, designed by Goettsch Partners, built in 2017.

The west side of the building features a lobby with a glass wall that is nearly 100 feet (30 m) tall at its peak. The architect's intention is to connect the interior and exterior visually.

One signature aspect of 150 North Riverside building is the way the office floors cantilever out from the central core. The building is constructed with a smaller base for a height of 8 stories (104 ft), and cantilevers out to the full size of the office floor space. This gives it a slenderness ratio of 1:20 at its base.

With its slender profile, the building was designed with a "tuned liquid damper" system. This system consists of two water-filled concrete vaults, located near the top of the skyscraper. As strong winds push up against the face of the building, the water sloshes in the opposite direction. These counteracting forces eliminate any sway that could occur during harsh weather.

Standing 752 ft (229m) tall, it is the tallest building in Chicago that is located west of the Chicago River.

== 150 Media Stream ==
Located in the lobby of 150 N Riverside, the 150 Media Stream is a public media art installation divided into 89 LED blades. It stretches over 150 feet long and reaches 22 feet high, the largest structure of its kind in the city.

== Reception ==
Variously referred to by popular names like "The Tuning Fork", "The Champagne Flute", or "The Guillotine", the building has become a highlight of architectural boat tours. Architecture critic Blair Kamin in his positive review calls it "a persuasive blend of the pragmatic and dramatic."

== See also ==
- List of tallest buildings in Chicago
