= Fort Beshangarh =

Fort in Jaipur, Rajasthan, India

Fort Beshangarh is a (former) fort in Manoharpur, Jaipur district, Rajasthan, India built in the 18th century on a single granite hill.

Its history dates back to the Shahpura royalty.

Since 2017, it houses a five-star hotel (Alila Hotels and Resorts) providing 59 suites.

== See also ==
- List of forts in India
- List of hotels: Countries I#India
