= Mark Yale Harris =

American sculptor (b. 1936)

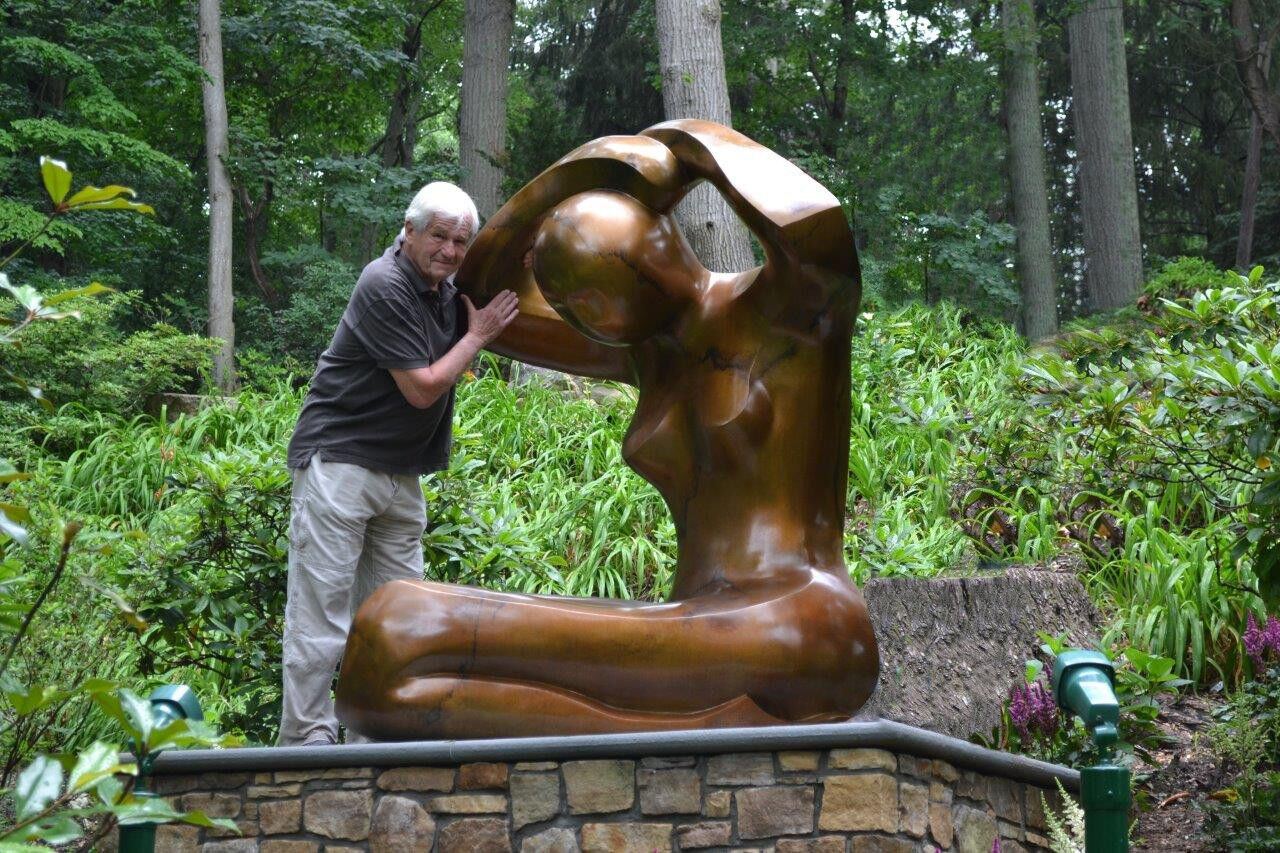
Mark Yale Harris (2015)

Mark Yale Harris (born 1936) is an American sculptor, and a former businessperson. He is working primarily in stone and bronze for his art. Beginning his professional life in the business sector, in 1972 Harris co-founded and was executive vice president of Red Roof Inns. In 1991, he founded AmeriSuites Hotels, where he served as CEO. He lives and works in the Roaring Fork Valley region of Colorado.

== Early life ==
Harris was born in Buffalo, New York in 1936. He attended the business program at Ohio State University (OSU), earning a B.S.S. degree in 1961.

== Business career ==
Harris worked for more than 30 years in hospitality/urban development. In 1972, he partnered with Jim Trueman, also an OSU alumnus, to co-found Red Roof Inn in Columbus, Ohio. The company opened over 300 properties primarily in the Midwest, South, and Eastern United States. In 1991, Harris founded Amerisuites. Within a short time, the company opened approximately 100 locations throughout the United States. In the late ‘90s, he sold this business to The Blackstone Group.

Based in Austin, Texas at the time, Harris chaired the Urban Land Institute, Austin District council 1998 to 2000, which led to his chairmanship of the 2nd Annual Smart Growth Conference, also in Austin, in 1999.

== Early artistic work and education ==
While Harris sold his main business in 1996, he continued with business projects while learning to carve stone. This became a passion after taking an alabaster carving class in Austin, Texas.

Harris then sought out a mentor in Aleut sculptor Bill Prokopiof, whose work he had long admired and collected. The artist invited Harris to work alongside him in his studio in Santa Fe, New Mexico. Nez Perce sculptor Doug Hyde took him under his wing. Both sculptors had been among the protégés of Native American sculptor Allan Houser (Chiricahua/Apache). Houser was known for his willingness to share his knowledge and Prokopiof and Hyde followed his lead.

While beginning to find a measure of recognition for his work, Harris continued to challenge himself and expand his creative development. Several intensive workshops contributed to his process and skill, including studies with singer-songwriter and multidisciplinary artist Terry Allen, Jo Harvey Allen, James Surls, Lincoln Fox and John Forno at the Anderson Ranch Arts Center and the Marble Institute of Colorado.

== Artwork ==
=== Stone ===
Harris began to work in alabaster, marble and limestone. Regarding his work, Harris said, “The motivation for me is to try and interpret an emotion, be it human or animal, within my media. In my case, attempting to blend form, figure, emotion and gesture often result in a figurative abstraction.” Of his intentions, he stated, “Life has a hard, aggressive side, as does much of my work, represented by rigid, angular lines. However, the soft side is also apparent, visible as curves and soft forms. My evolving body of work evokes this duality.”

=== Monumental bronze ===
In 2006, the artist enlarged a tabletop-sized maquette into monumental proportions. He found that some pieces work best on an intimate scale, while others require sheer size. He formed large works that lent themselves more to bronze. Recent instruction at CREATE Center for the Arts introduced Harris to the use of the virtual reality program Oculus as an adjunct to his existing practice of drawing preliminary sketches before working directly with the stone. He sponsored a lecture and demonstration series, Untapped Potential, VR for Artists, at Carbondale Arts and The Art Base.

=== Animal sculpture ===
Though known for his figurative works, Harris also has a significant portfolio of animal sculptures. The psychological overtones of his figurative works give way to moments in time and the whimsy of nature. Harris captures the lumbering bear’s walk, the graceful leap of fish from the water, the lazy heaviness of cattle.

== Selected exhibitions ==
Harris' art is represented by over twenty galleries in the US and UK. He has appeared in solo, museum and international exhibitions, including the Royal Academy of London, United Kingdom; Marin MOCA; High Desert Museum; Ventana Fine Art, Santa Fe, New Mexico; National Museum of Wildlife Art; Orange County Center for Contemporary Art; Royal Scottish Academy, Edinburgh, United Kingdom; National Sculpture Society, New York, New York; Millicent Rogers Museum, Taos, New Mexico; The Wildlife Experience Museum; Peace Arch Park; Museum of the Southwest; Palm Springs Art Museum; Cheyenne Frontier Days Old West Museum; Yellowstone Art Museum; and the Austin Museum of Art.

== Recognition ==
- Columbus Museum of Art’s Decorator Show House - Columbus, Ohio (2015)
- Second Place, Sculpture - Museum of the Southwest, Group Exhibition - Midland, Texas (2009)
- Best of Show: Second Place, 3D Mixed Media Division - Museum of the Southwest, Spring Juried Art Exhibition - Midland, Texas (2007)
- Roswell Museum, Sculpture - sponsor, Roswell Chamber of Commerce - Roswell, New Mexico (2002)
- First Place, Elisabeth Ney Museum Sculpture Show - Austin, Texas (1996)

== Organizations ==
- International Sculpture Center
- Carbondale Public Arts Commission (Colorado), former Chair
- New Mexico Sculptors Guild, former Vice-Chair
- National Sculpture Society Texas Society of Sculptors
- Texas Fine Arts Association
- Friends of Contemporary Art Santa Fe
- Austin Visual Artist’s Association
- Society of Animal Artists
