= Oscar Wang (visual artist) =

Chinese visual artist

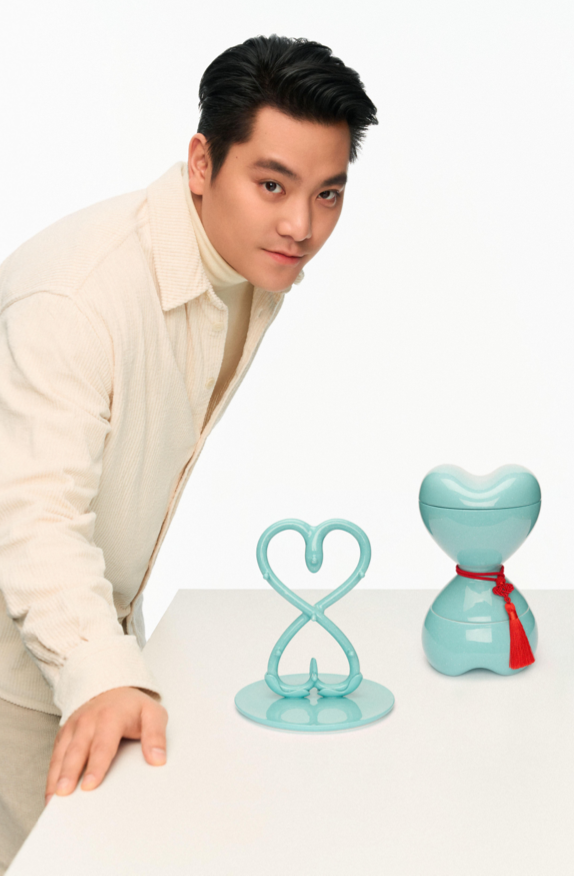
- Born: 王令塵; 16 August 1990 (age 36); Hong Kong
- Mother: Sylvia Chang

Oscar Wang (simplified Chinese: 王令尘; traditional Chinese: 王令塵; pinyin: Wang Lingchen; Jyutping: wong4 ling6 can4, born August 16, 1990) is a Chinese designer and visual artist, currently living in Shanghai.

== Early life and career ==
Wang was born in Hong Kong in 1990. In 2000, at the age of 9, he was kidnapped in Mong Kok with a ransom demand of 15 million Hong Kong dollars. The incident led to him and his mother, actress and director Sylvia Chang, relocating abroad for an extended period. In a 2023 interview, Wang described this experience as not being "part of normal growth."

In 2013, Wang graduated from the Chelsea College of Arts in the UK with a degree in Fine Art Sculpture and Spatial Design. During his education in the United Kingdom, he interned at David Collins Studio, where he gained experience in spatial design and brand development projects. Following graduation in 2014, he returned to Shanghai to work in the design field and established Openwork Studio in 2019.

Wang has collaborated with several fashion brands throughout his career. In 2015, he worked with Louis Vuitton on a travel trunk design for Louis Vuitton X that incorporated bird flight path motifs into the traditional Monogram pattern.

In 2017, he designed the brand image for actor Jet Li's Tai Chi brand GSD, developing designs for competition venues and athlete uniforms. The following year, Wang participated as a Chinese designer representative at Design Miami upon Fendi's invitation, creating designs for the brand's Peekaboo bag line.

== Collaborations ==
=== Fendi ===
In 2018, Wang was invited to the Design Miami exhibition, where he created a design for Fendi's Peekaboo bag inspired by the concept of family. This marked the beginning of a long-term collaboration with Fendi, including the 2019 "FENDI Panda Family" installation at Chengdu IFS. In 2022, he contributed to Fendi's global holiday campaign, designing a Christmas installation titled "FENDINO," featuring the character seated atop a Fendi baguette.

=== Stella McCartney ===
In 2021, Wang collaborated with designer brand Stella McCartney to develop the "STELLA FRIENDS" cartoon animal series, overseeing concept development, character design, and animation.

=== Daniel Arsham ===
In December 2022, Wang launched the "Dongxi" (东西) limited-edition collectible project in collaboration with Daniel Arsham's platform, Archive Editions. The artwork made its debut at Design Miami's exhibition in Shanghai at Zhangyuan.

=== Li-Ning ===
In 2023, Wang provided visual and set design for Li-Ning's "MY-VERSE" Paris SS24 fashion show.

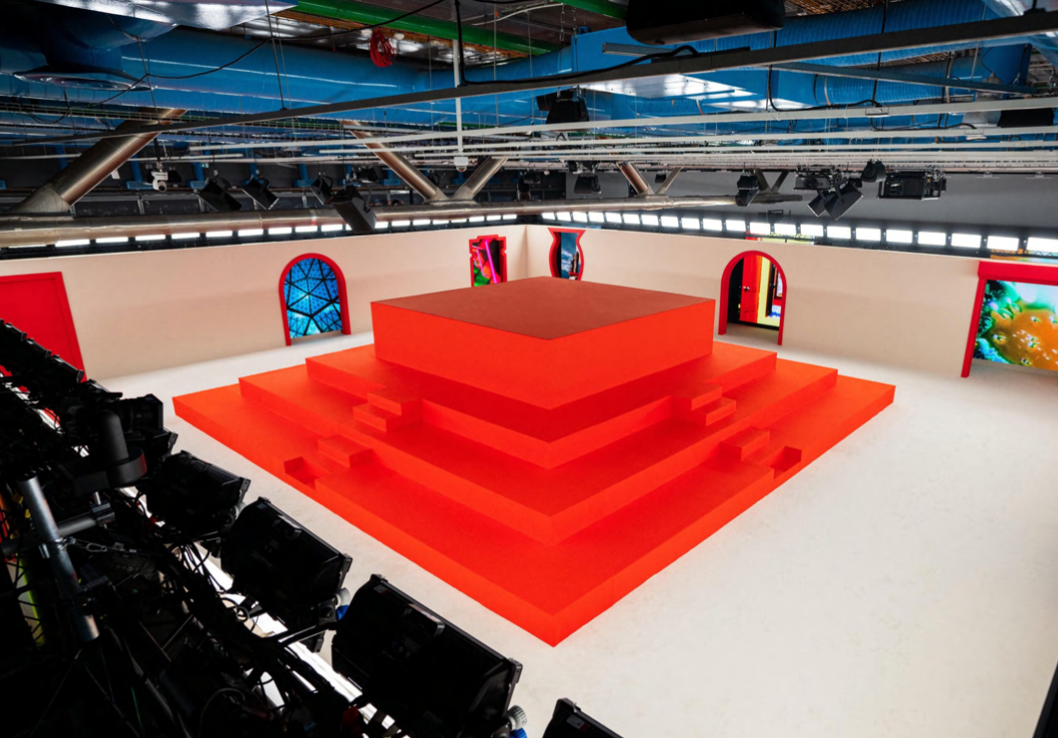
Li-Ning's fashion runway

=== Alila Hotel ===
In 2024, Wang designed the "Shu Ju (树聚)" installation and a series of ceramic incense burners for the Alila Hotel in Shanghai.

=== Ferragamo ===
In March, Wang designed the "LONG TIME NO HUG" display for Ferragamo's Landmark store in Hong Kong and hosted a Ferragamo dinner event.

=== Suhe Art Festival ===
In November, Wang's work "Journey" (蓝途) was exhibited at the Suhe Art Festival, featuring a large tree intertwined with the nearby Suzhou Creek. In December, Wang collaborated on the BELOWGROUND limited-edition tea set.

=== Tiffany & Co. ===
In January 2025, Wang created a limited-edition porcelain collection for Tiffany & Co.'s Chinese New Year campaign, featuring Dehua white porcelain with the brand's signature blue glaze and traditional Chinese knot motifs.
