= Hyatt Regency Hong Kong, Sha Tin =

Coordinates: 22.41195°N 114.21133°E

Hyatt Regency Hong Kong, Sha Tin 香港沙田凱悅酒店
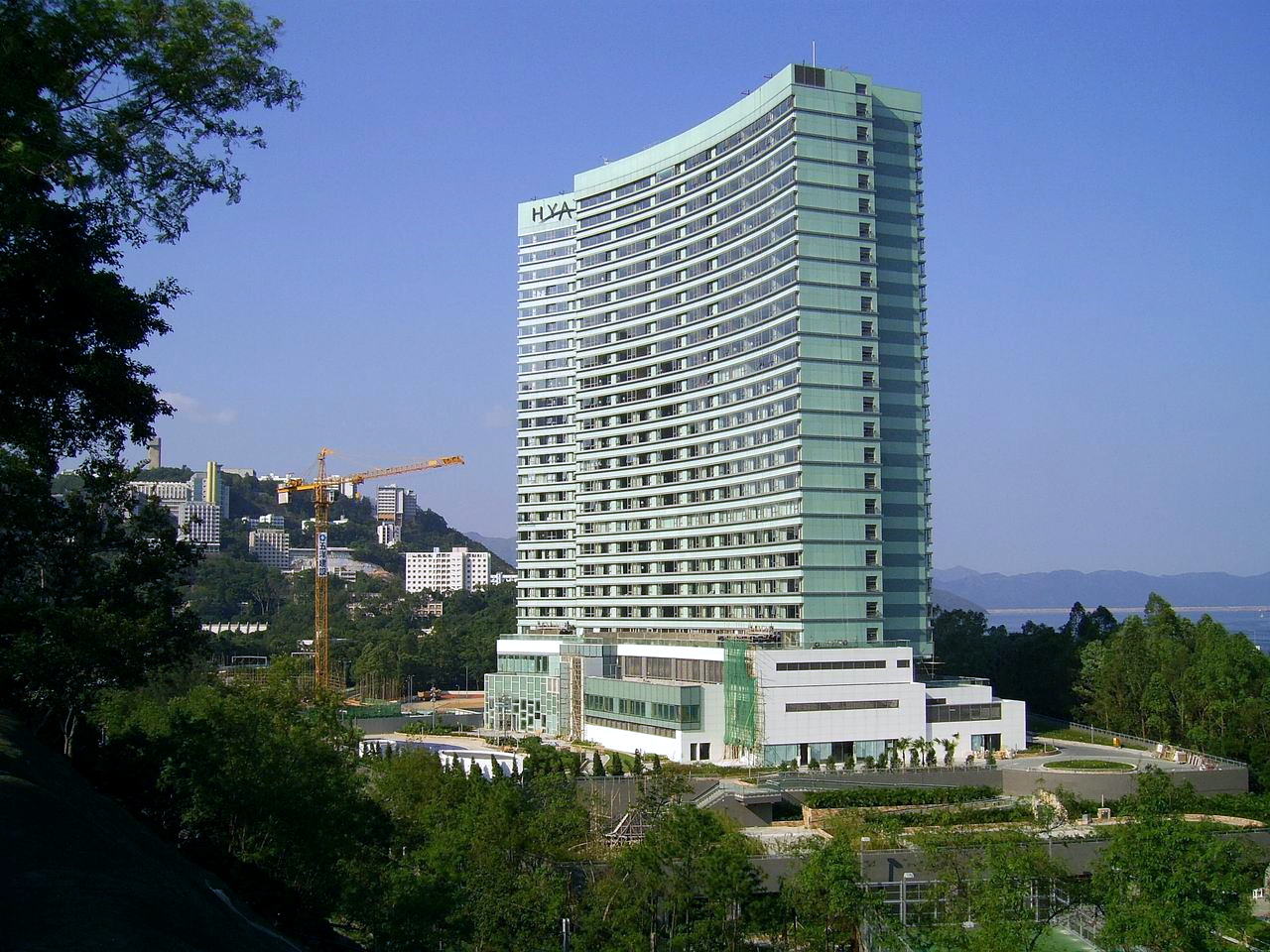
- Hyatt Regency Hong Kong, Sha Tin.
- Interactive map of the Hyatt Regency Hong Kong, Sha Tin 香港沙田凱悅酒店 area

General information
- Location: 18 Chak Cheung Street, Sha Tin District, New Territories, Hong Kong
- Opening: 11 February 2009; 17 years ago
- Owner: New World Development (under license of Hyatt Hotels Corporation)

Technical details
- Floor count: 26

Other information
- Number of rooms: 559
- Number of suites: 132
- Number of restaurants: 2 restaurants and a bar

Website
- http://hongkong.shatin.hyatt.com/

Hyatt Regency Hong Kong, Sha Tin, on 18 Chak Cheung Street, Ma Liu Shui, Sha Tin District, New Territories, Hong Kong, is the first international hotel in the New Territories. It is a 5 star hotel.

== Facilities ==
The hotel has 427 guestrooms and suites, including 132 Long Stay Suites and a Presidential Suite.

The hotel is home to 5 restaurants and bars.

Over 750 square metres (10,764 sq ft) has been dedicated to meeting and event space, including the pillar-less Regency Ballroom and three Salon meeting rooms.

Other recreational facilities include a fitness centre, a 25m outdoor heated swimming pool, tennis court, sauna and steam facilities.

== Location ==
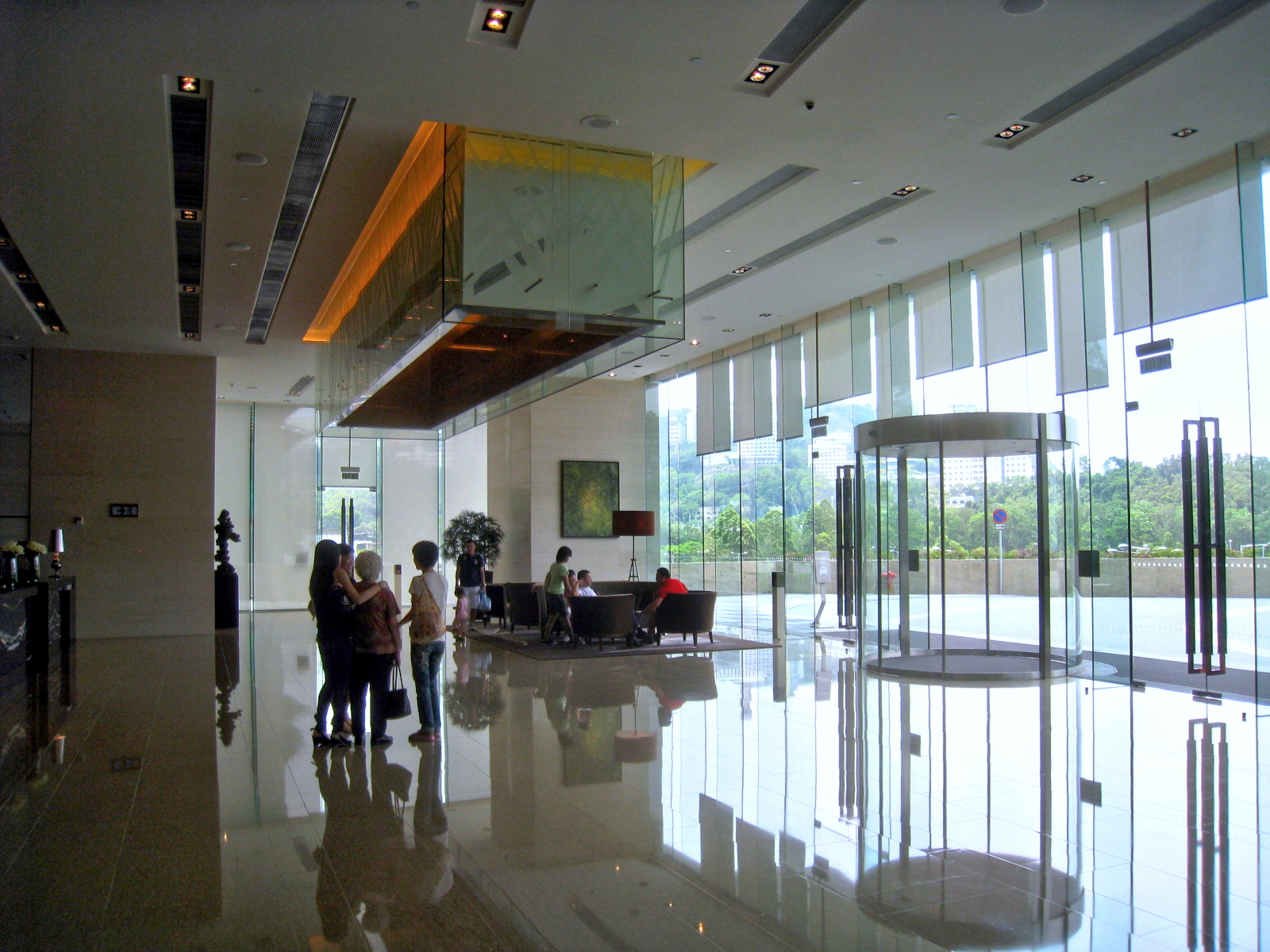
Hyatt Regency Shatin hotel lobby.

Situated adjacent to the Chinese University of Hong Kong and located by University station, the hotel offers direct access to Tsim Sha Tsui, Hong Kong Island, Lo Wu and Lok Ma Chau via the East Rail.

== Relationship with Chinese University of Hong Kong ==
The Hotel is built as a hotel partner with the support of the New World Development Company, Ltd. The project included two components – a commercial hotel and the teaching facilities nextdoor. It provides School of Hotel and Tourism Management (SHTM) students at the Chinese University of Hong Kong an opportunity to learn from Hyatt via the six specially designed training rooms and experience sharings by the hotel's management team. The teaching facilities is the first phase of the CUHK BA Block. It includes 10,000 square meters of conference and teaching facilities, SHTM students will have first hand and learning through running and managing the Cafe in the teaching facilities.

== Gallery ==
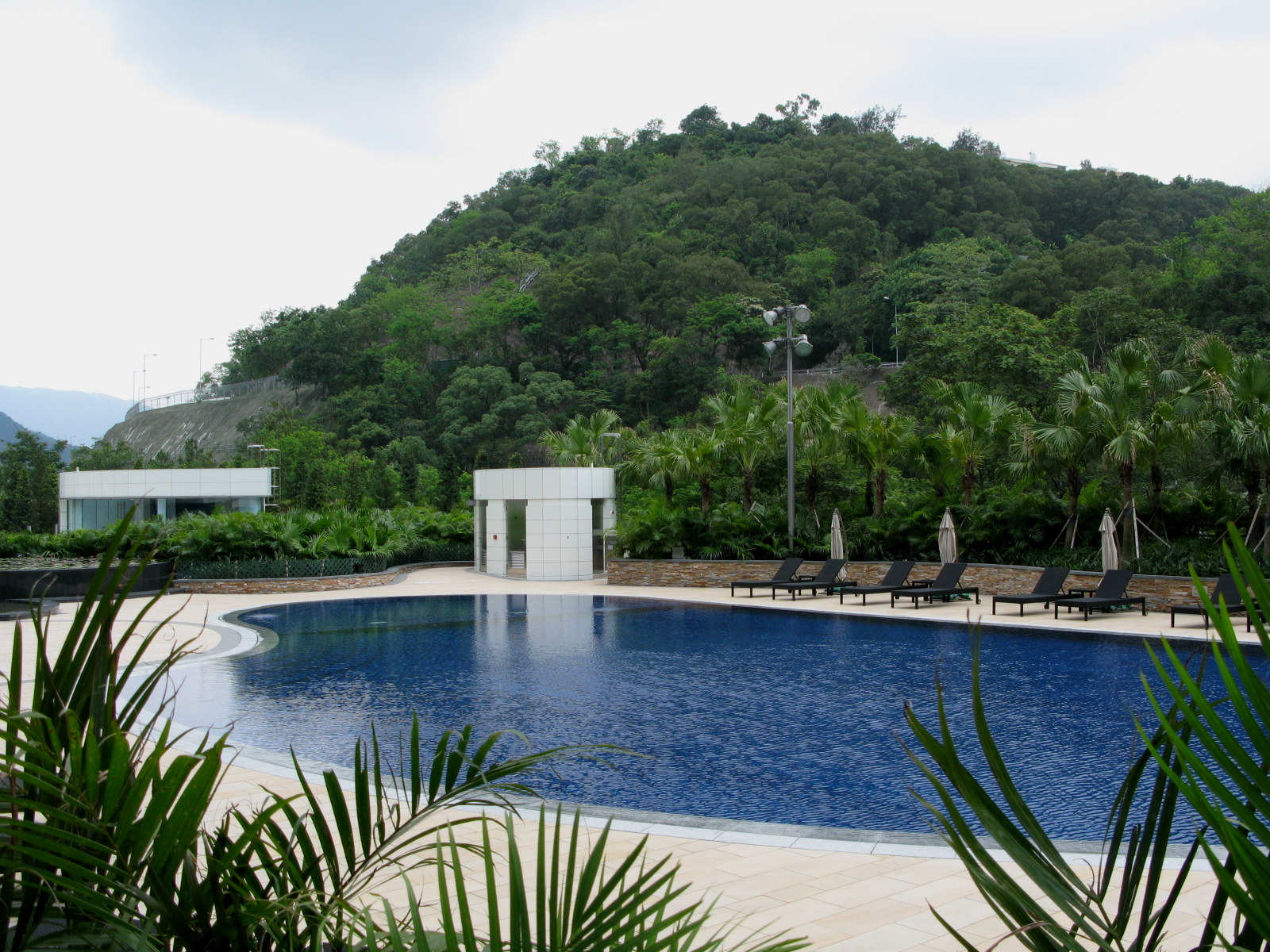

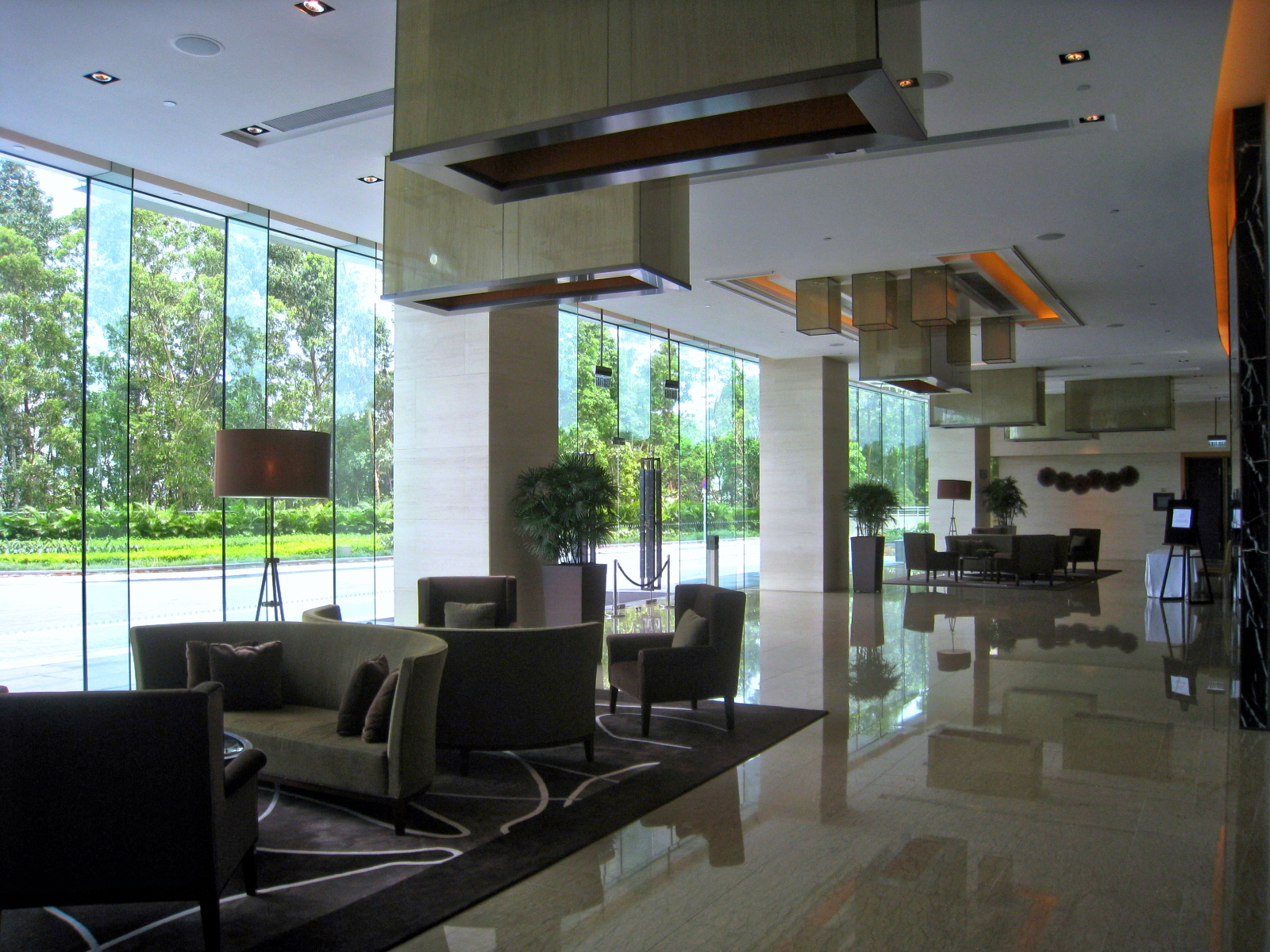

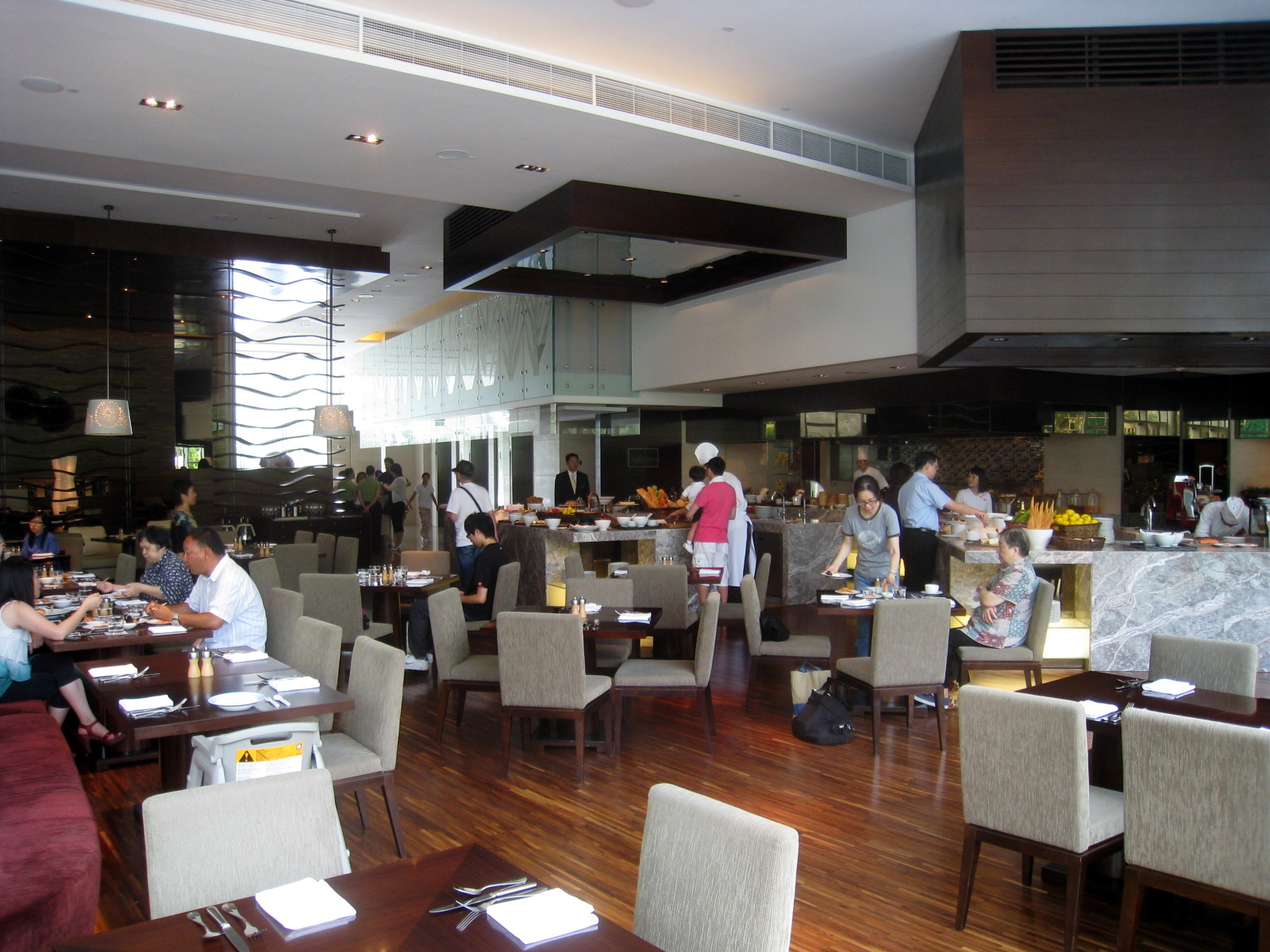
