= Destination by Hyatt =

American lodging management company

- Type: Private
- Industry: Hospitality management
- Founded: 1972; 54 years ago
- Headquarters: Englewood, Colorado
- Number of locations: 40
- Owner: Hyatt
- Website: www.hyatt.com/destination-by-hyatt/en-US

Destination by Hyatt is a privately held lodging management company headquartered in Englewood, Colorado. It is the United States' largest independent hospitality management company, representing 40 luxury and upscale hotels, resorts and golf clubs internationally. The collection includes a mix of mountain, beach and city properties across the United States and Scotland.

== History ==
Destination Hotels began in 1972 (as Destination Hotels & Resorts) with the opening of The Gant in Aspen, one of the first condominium resort properties in the United States to offer contemporary hotel services such as concierge and front desk. Destination Hotels was a subsidiary of Lowe Hospitality Group (LHG), which is owned by Lowe Enterprises, a privately held national real estate investment, management and development firm headquartered in Los Angeles, California until October 2018. The company partners with affiliate Lowe Destination Development, also an LHG subsidiary, to development hospitality projects including both hotels and resort residential communities. LDD hotel and resort projects are managed by Destination Hotels upon completion.

In January 2016, Destination Hotels merged with Commune Hotels. In October 2018, Hyatt purchased Two Roads Hospitality which owned Destination Hotels at the time.

== Properties ==
The company's portfolio features 21 golf courses, 20 full-service spas, six IACC certified conference centers, and 110 bars and restaurants located in key states. On 5 October 2022, a new addition was announced, the first property outside of the US, in the Scottish Borders.
