= AmeriSuites =

Former American hotel chain

AmeriSuites Hotels was an American hotel chain last owned by Hyatt, which merged it into its Hyatt Place brand.

== History ==
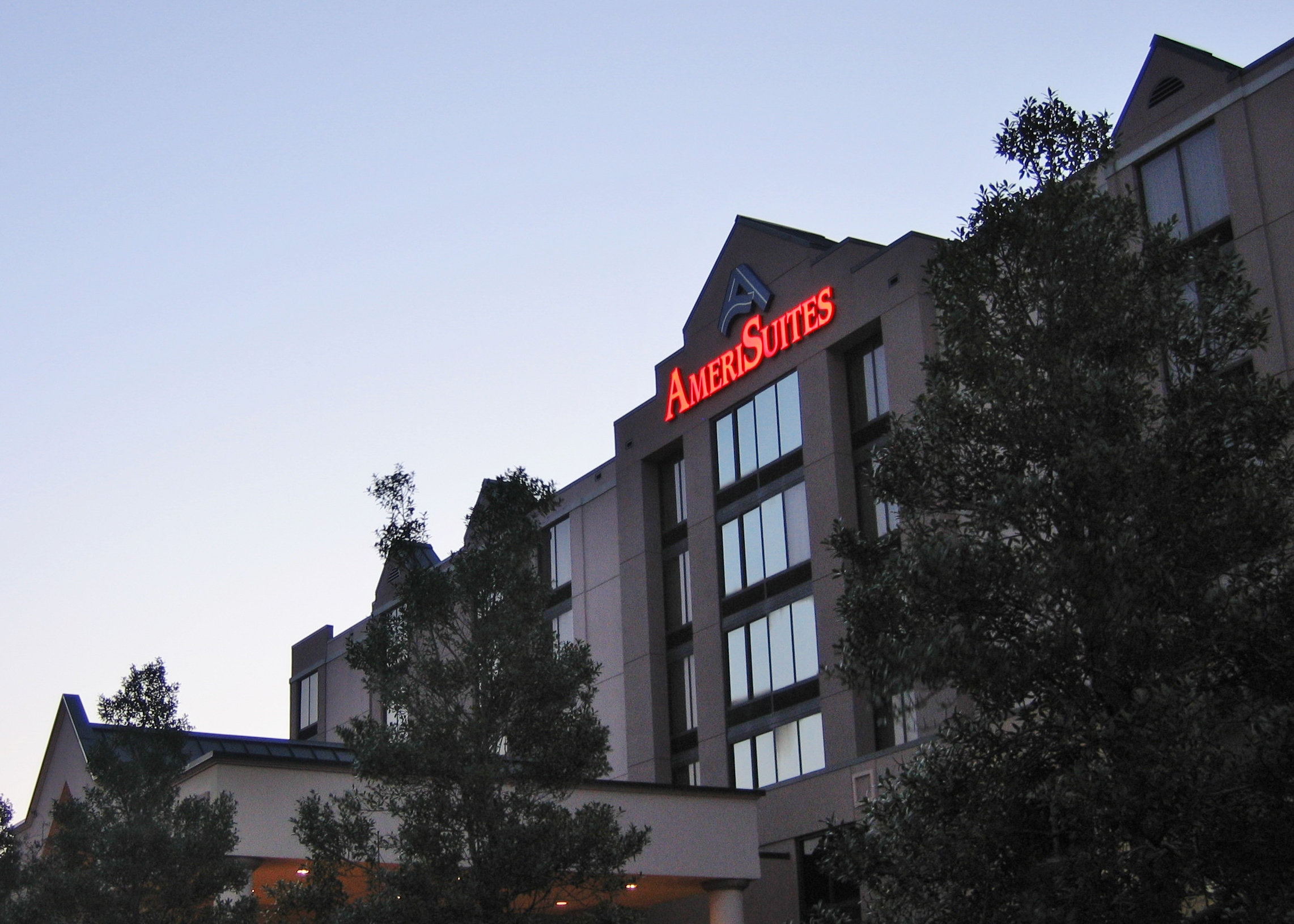
A former AmeriSuites hotel.

It was founded by Mark Yale Harris, cofounder of Red Roof Inns. In 1991, Harris founded AmeriSuites Hotels. AmeriSuites was an innovator in offering one of the first available affordable suite accommodations. It grew to over 100 locations throughout the United States.

In 1998, AmeriSuites was sold to the Blackstone Group, who operated AmeriSuites under its Prime Hospitality division. In 2005 Blackstone Real Estate Partners sold AmeriSuites to Hyatt. Between 2006 and 2009, Hyatt phased out the AmeriSuites brand and converted the properties into the then-new Hyatt Place brand.
