= Governor Smith =

Governor Smith may refer to:

== In the United States ==
- Al Smith (1873–1944), Governor of New York
- Benjamin Smith (North Carolina politician) (1756–1826), Governor of North Carolina
- Charles Aurelius Smith (1861–1916), Governor of South Carolina
- Charles Manley Smith (1868–1937), Governor of Vermont
- Edward Curtis Smith (1854–1935), Governor of Vermont, son of J. Gregory Smith.
- Elmo Smith (1909–1968), Governor of Oregon
- Forrest Smith (1886–1962), Governor of Missouri
- George William Smith (politician) (1762–1811), acting Governor of Virginia
- Green C. Smith (1826–1895), Territorial Governor of Montana
- Henry Smith (Texas governor) (1788–1851), Governor of Texas
- Henry Smith (Rhode Island governor) (1766–1818), Governor of Rhode Island
- Hoke Smith (1855–1931), Governor of Georgia
- Hulett C. Smith (1918–2012), Governor of West Virginia
- Israel Smith (1759–1810), Governor of Vermont
- J. Gregory Smith (1818–1891), Governor of Vermont
- James Milton Smith (1823–1890), Governor of Georgia
- James Y. Smith (1809–1876), Governor of Rhode Island
- Jeremiah Smith (lawyer) (1759–1842), Governor of New Hampshire
- John Smith (explorer) (1580–1631), Colonial Governor of Virginia from 1608 to 1609
- John Smith (President of Rhode Island) (died 1663), Governor of Rhode Island
- John Butler Smith (1838–1914), Governor of New Hampshire
- John Cotton Smith (1765–1845), Governor of Connecticut
- John Walter Smith (1845–1925), Governor of Maryland
- Nels H. Smith (1884–1976), Governor of Wyoming
- Persifor Frazer Smith (1798–1858), 6th Military Governor of California
- Preston Smith (governor) (1912–2003), Governor of Texas
- Robert Burns Smith (1854–1908), Governor of Montana
- Jason Jones' nickname to Rod Blagojevich (b. 1956), Governor of Illinois
- Roy Campbell Smith (1858–1940), Governor of Guam
- Samuel E. Smith (1788–1860), Governor of Maine
- Thomas Smith (governor of South Carolina) (1648–1694), Governor of colonial South Carolina from 1693 to 1694
- William Smith (Virginia governor) (1797–1887), 30th and 35th Governor of Virginia
- William E. Smith (politician) (1824–1883), Governor of Wisconsin
- William Hugh Smith (1826–1899), Governor of Alabama
- William "Tangier" Smith (1655–1705), Provincial Governor of New York

== In other places ==
- Augustus Smith (politician) (1804–1872), Governor of the Isles of Scilly
- Cecil Clementi Smith (1840–1916), Governor of the Straits Settlements from 1887 to 1893
- Gerard Smith (governor) (1839–1920), Governor of Western Australia
- Sir Harry Smith, 1st Baronet (1787–1860), Governor of the Province of Queen Adelaide, and of Cape Colony from 1847 to 1852
- Henry Abel Smith (1900–1993), Governor of Queensland
- James Francis Smith (1859–1928), Governor-General of the Philippines
- John Hilary Smith (born 1928), Governor of the Gilbert and Ellice Islands from 1973 to 1978
- John Hope Smith (1780s–1831), Governor of the Committee of Merchants of the Gold Coast from 1817 to 1822
- Sir Lionel Smith, 1st Baronet (1778–1842), Governor of Jamaica
- Peter Smith (diplomat) (born 1942), Governor of the Cayman Islands from 1999 to 2002
- Reginald Dorman-Smith (1899–1977), Governor of Burma
- Robert Smith (colonial administrator) (1887–1959), British Governor of North Borneo from 1937 to 1942 and from 1945 to 1946
- Thomas Smith (Royal Navy officer, died 1762) (1707–1762), Governor of Newfoundland in 1741 and 1743

== See also ==
- Frederick Smyth (New Hampshire politician) (1819–1899), Governor of New Hampshire
- Henry Augustus Smyth (1825–1906), Acting Governor of Cape Colony in 1889 and Governor of Malta from 1890 to 1893
- Leicester Smyth (1829–1891), Governor of Gibraltar from 1890 to 1891
- Judge Smith (disambiguation)
- Justice Smith (disambiguation)
- Mayor Smith (disambiguation)
- Mister Smith (disambiguation)
- President Smith (disambiguation)
