= Lyndall =

Lyndall is a given name and a surname. Notable people with the name include:

- Lyndall Barbour (1916–1986), Australian actress, primarily of radio
- Lyndall Bass (born 1952), American realist painter
- Lyndall Fraker (born 1959), American politician
- Lyndall Gordon (born 1941), British-based biographical and former academic writer
- Lyndall Hadow (1903–1976), Western Australian short story writer and journalist
- Lyndall Hobbs (born 1952), Australian film director and producer
- Lyndall Jarvis, South African model and television presenter
- Dorothy Lyndall (1891–1979), American dancer and dance educator
- Lyndall Ryan, AM, FAHA (born 1943), Australian academic and historian
- Lyndall Urwick MC (1891–1983), British management consultant and business thinker

== See also ==
- Lindahl (disambiguation)
- Lindale (disambiguation)
- Lindell (disambiguation)
- Lindley (disambiguation)
- Lindol (disambiguation)
- Lyndale (disambiguation)
