= Lindol =

Lindol may refer to:

- Lindol Smith (1832–?), mayor of Moscow, Idaho, United States
- Luisito Espinosa (born 1967), nicknamed "Lindol", retired Filipino boxer
- Lindol, a trade name for a lubricant additive consisting primarily of tricresyl phosphate

== Television ==
- "Lindol", an episode of Tadhana
- "Lindol", an episode of Parasite Island
- "Lindol", an episode of Abot-Kamay na Pangarap

== See also ==
- List of earthquakes in the Philippines
- Lindell (disambiguation)
- Lyndall, a surname
