= Lindal (disambiguation) =

Lindal in Furness is a village in Cumbria, England.

Lindal may also refer to:

- Lindal Homes, American manufacturer of prefabricated houses
- Lindal valve, a valve used in gas canisters

== People with the name ==
=== Given name ===
- Lindal Rohde (born 1990), Australian rules footballer

=== Surname ===
- Andre Lindal (born 1977), Norwegian musician based in United States
- Tommy Lindal, Norwegian goth metal musician
- Vic Lindal (born 1937), Canadian volleyball coach

== See also ==
- Lindale (disambiguation)
