= Propane, butane, and LPG container valve connections =

Fuel gas connections

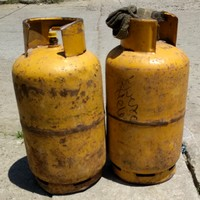
LPG distribution in Colombia.

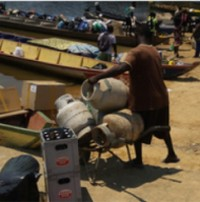
LPG distribution in Suriname.

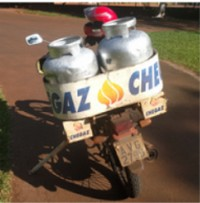
LPG distribution in Brazil.

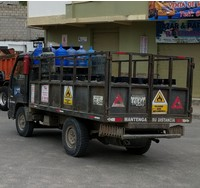
LPG distribution in Ecuador.

Several types of valve connections for propane, butane, and LPG containers exist for transport and storage, sometimes with overlapping usage and applications, and there are major differences in usage between different countries. Even within a single country more than one type can be in use for a specific application. This requires adequate tooling and adapters for replenishment in multiple countries. For example for overlanders and users of autogas traveling with a container originating in one country to other parts of the world this is a major concern. This article describes existing standards and the standards in use for a number of countries. For disposable containers the availability per country is described. Filling stations may be able and allowed to fill foreign containers if adequate adapters are available. Adapters are provided by, amongst others, camping stores. The iOverlander database maintained by travelers, My LPG and the Facebook group "Cooking Gas Around the World" provide more information about individual sources per country. Much general information about global LPG use and standardization is available from the World LPG Association and the AEGPL

== Container types ==
The main containers of liquefied petroleum gas, propane and butane are automotive tanks, disposable cylinders, permanent tanks and portable cylinders.

Container Type	Important Uses	Way of Replenishment
Automotive	Autogas	Fuel station
Disposable cylinders	Camping, tools	Replacement
Portable cylinders	Heating, cooking	Exchange, filling station, gravity filling
Permanent tanks	Heating, cooking	Tank truck

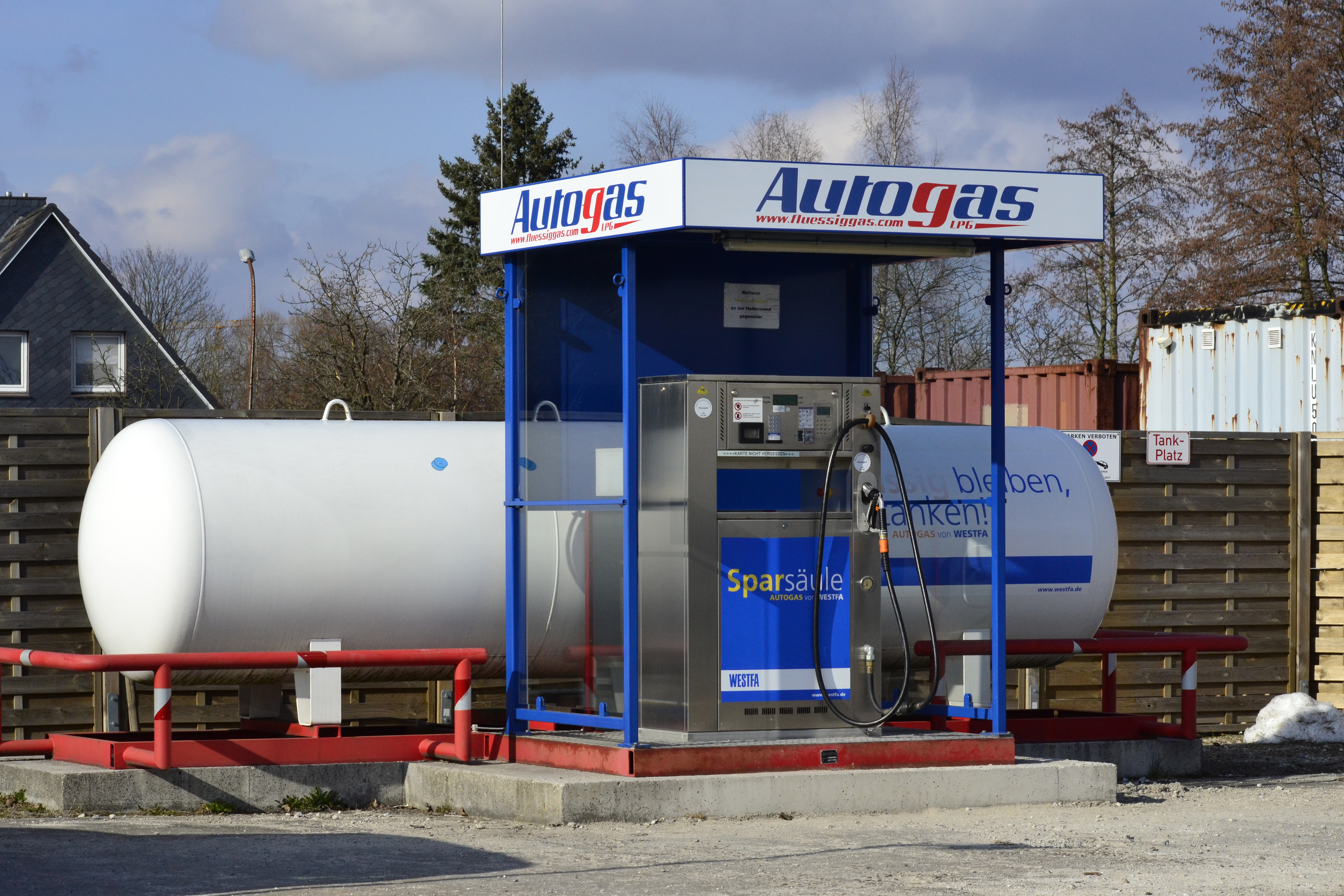
An autogas station in Germany.

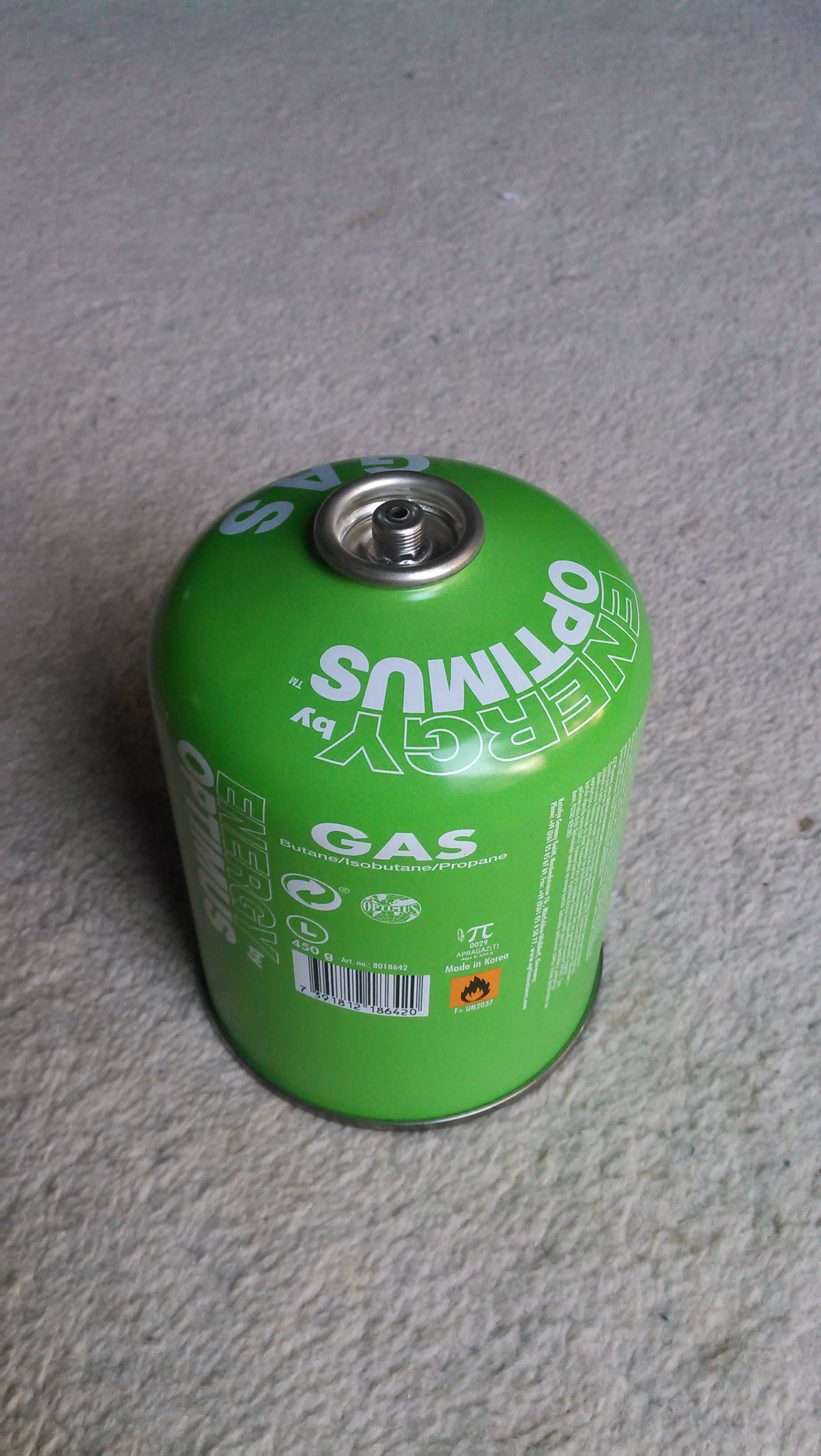
Disposable 450 g camping gas cylinder.

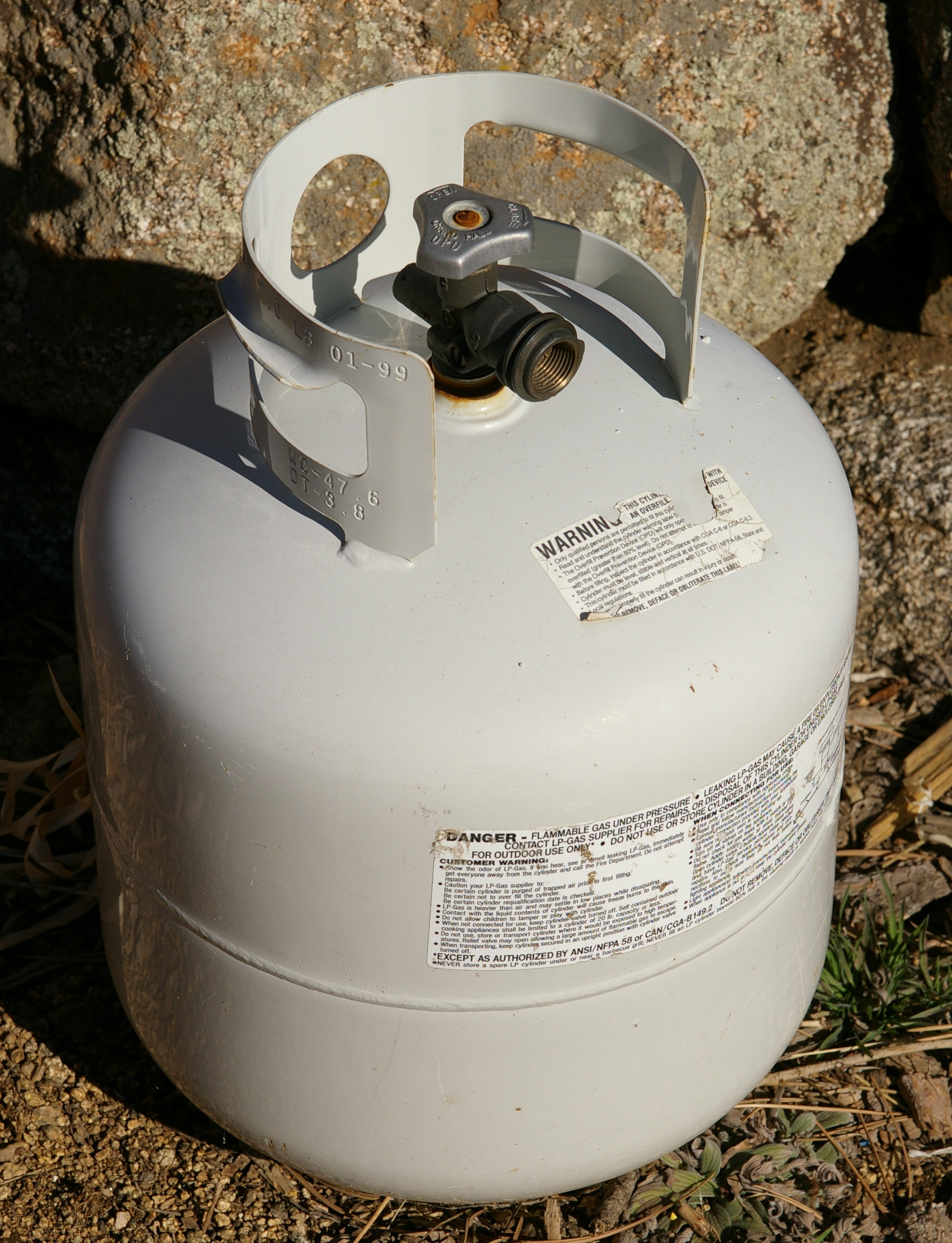
A 9 kg portable propane tank.

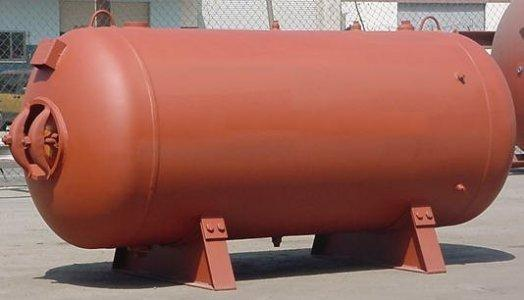
A permanent pressure vessel storage tank.

== Connector types and standards ==
The list of standards shows one applicable standard for each connector type listed in the table below. A single applicable standard has been chosen in case multiple versions of the same standard have been published, for example a German and a European version.

=== Overview of standards ===
Name	Description
ABNT NBR 8614	Brazilian standard for automatic valves for transportable containers of 2 kg, 5 kg and 13 kg of LPG, first published in 1997. (Portuguese name: Válvulas automáticas para recipientes transportáveis para 2 kg, 5 kg e 13 kg de GLP.
Autogas	Can refer to several connector standards, colloquially known as ACME, Bayonet, Dish or Euronozzle connectors.
DIN 477-1 No. 4	A DIN standard for gas cylinder valves for test pressures up to 300 bar (4,400 psi).
EN 15202	A European standard for LPG equipment and accessories, specifying LPG cylinder valve connections.
EN 417	European norm specification concerning non-refillable metallic cartridges for liquefied petroleum gases. The EN 417 norm specifies container construction, but does however not specify any connectors.
IS-8737	Indian standard for LPG connectors for use with cylinders of more than 5 liter water capacity.
KHK S0126	Japanese standard for LPG container valve design and manufacturing.
SAEF	American standard specified by U.S. based SAE International.
SANS 10019:2011	South African standard for connectors.
SNI 1591 : 2008	Indonesia: Forms, materials and components, construction requirements, quality requirements, and test methods of LPG steel tube valves.
M-thread	The designation used for international ISO metric screw threads.
BSP	British Standard Pipe, a type of threads originating from Britain.
UNEF	A Unified Thread Standard originating from the USA, where the EF designation indicates an "Extra Fine" thread pitch.

=== List of connector types ===
The Connector Types Table lists connectors that are found on propane, butane and LPG containers, the standards these connectors adhere to as well as the most important parameters of these connectors.

Name	Connector standard	Thread standard	Nominal diameter (mm)	Pitch (mm)	Nominal diameter (inch)	Pitch (TPI)	Interface	Direction
1 ¾" x 6 ACME (G.31)	Autogas Acme		44.5 mm	6.35 mm	1-3/4"	4 TPI	EXT	RH
1 1/4" x 5 ACME (G.29)	EN 15202					No thread		
1 1/4" x 5 ACME LH (G.30)	EN 15202					No thread		LH
7/16" UNEF camping	N/A	Lindal B188	11.1 mm	0.907 mm	7/16"	28 TPI	EXT	
1 lb (16 oz) propane bottle (Coleman) 1"-20	CGA600	UNEF	25.4 mm	1.27 mm	1"	20 tpi	EXT	RH
ABNT NBR 13794	ABNT NBR 8614	NPT	19.1 mm	1.814 mm	3/4"	14 TPI		
ABNT NBR 8614 a	ABNT NBR 8614	NPT	9.5 mm		3/8"	No thread		
ABNT NBR 8614 b	ABNT NBR 8614	NPT	19.1 mm	1.814 mm	3/4"	14 TPI		
Bayonet	Autogas Bayonet					No thread		
Bayonet camping	N/A					No thread	EXT	N/A
Butane Canister, 225 g (8 oz)	N/A					No thread	EXT	N/A
Camping gas VBC02 (G.3)	EN 15202	ISO	16.0 mm	1.5 mm	0.629"	16.93 TPI	INT	RH
Camping gas VBC03 (G.33)	EN 15202	BSP	16.7 mm	1.337 mm	3/8"	19 TPI		
DIN 477-1 No. 4	DIN 477-1 No. 4	BSP	16.7 mm	1.337 mm	3/8"	19 TPI		
Dish	Autogas Dish					No thread	INT	
Euro Nozzle	Autogas Euro					No thread	EXT	
EU-Shell (G.8)	EN 15202	BSW	21.8 mm	1.814 mm	0.858"	14 TPI	EXT	LH
G 3/8 LH (G.33)	EN 15202	BSP	16.7 mm	1.337 mm	3/8"	19 TPI		
G 3/8 LH EN ISO 228-1 (G.25)	EN 15202					No thread		LH
Gaz (G.3)	EN 15202	ISO	16 mm	1.5 mm	0.629"	16.93 TPI	INT	RH
GF – Grossflasche (G.04)	EN 15202	ISO	21.8 mm	1.814 mm	0.858"	14 TPI	EXT	LH
IS-8737	IS-8737					No thread		
Ital. A (EN 16129 G.1)	EN 15202	BSW	20 mm	1.814 mm	0.787"	14 TPI	EXT	LH
KHK S0126 clip on	KHK S0126					No thread		
KLF – Kleinflasche (G.12)	EN 15202	BSW	21.8 mm	1.814 mm	0.858"	14 TPI	EXT	LH
Liquid withdrawal VL07	EN 15202	NGO	21.8 mm	1.814 mm	0.885"	14 TPI	INT	LH
Neck valve 20 mm (G.64)	EN 15202		20 mm		0.787"	No thread	INT	
POL 105 (EN 16129 G.7)	EN 15202	BSP	22.9 mm	1.814 mm	5/8"	14 TPI	INT	LH
POL US (G.9)	EN 15202	NGO	22.3 mm	1.814 mm	0.880"	14 TPI	INT	LH
POL-WS (G.10)	EN 15202	NGO	22.3 mm	1.814 mm	0.880"	14 TPI	INT	LH
Primus (G.32)	EN 15202	ISO	14 mm	1.5 mm	0.551"	16.93 TPI	INT	RH
QCC Type 1 (G.9)	EN 15202		33.3 mm	5.080 mm	1-5/16"	5 TPI	EXT	RH
Quick coupling 16 mm (G.50)	EN 15202		16 mm		0.629	No thread	INT	
Quick coupling 19 mm (G.51)	EN 15202		19 mm		0.748"	No thread	INT	
Quick coupling 20 mm (G.52)	EN 15202		20 mm		0.787"	No thread	INT	
Quick coupling 21 mm (G.53)	EN 15202		21 mm		0.827"	No thread	INT	
Quick coupling 21.7 mm threaded (G.57)	EN 15202		21.7 mm		0.858"	No thread		
Quick coupling 22 mm (G.54)	EN 15202		22 mm		0.866	No thread		
Quick coupling 24.4 mm (G.58)	EN 15202		24.4 mm		1"	No thread		
Quick coupling 24.5 mm (G.55)	EN 15202		24.5 mm		1"	No thread		
Quick coupling 24.5 mm (G.60)	EN 15202		25.4 mm		1"	No thread		
Quick coupling 27 mm (G.59)	EN 15202		27 mm		1.063"	No thread		
Quick coupling 35 mm Jumbo (G.56)	EN 15202		35 mm		1.378"	No thread		
Quick coupling bayonet (G.61)	EN 15202					No thread		
Quick Coupling Fork Lift (G.66)	EN 15202					No thread		
Quick Coupling Fork Lift Bayonet (G.65)	EN 15202					No thread		
SAEF 1/2"	SAEF		12.7 mm	1.954 mm	1/2"	13 TPI	INT	RH
SANS 10019 small cylinders	SANS 10019	BSP	16.7 mm	1.337 mm	3/8"	19 TPI		
Shell-F (G.2)	EN 15202	ISO	21.7 mm	1.814 mm	0.858"	14 TPI	EXT	LH
SNI 1591 : 2008 a	SNI 1591	NPT	12.7 mm		1/2"			
SNI 1591 : 2008 b	SNI 1591	NPT	19.1 mm		3/4"	No thread		
SNI 1591 : 2008 c	SNI 1591	NPT	19.1 mm		3/4"	No thread		
Threaded connection W 14,8 x 1/18 (G.21)	EN 15202		14.8 mm	0.056 mm	0.582677165		EXT	LH
VP01 (G.9)	EN 15202		POL					
VP02 (G.9)	EN 15202		POL					
VP03 (G.9)	EN 15202		POL					
W 21,8 x 1,814 LH – 55° (G.05)	EN 15202	BSW	21.8 mm	1.814 mm	0.858"	14 TPI	EXT	LH
W 21,8 x 1,814 LH (G.19)	EN 15202		21.8 mm	1.814 mm	0.858"	14 TPI	EXT	LH
W 22 x 1,155 LH (G.06)	EN 15202					No thread		LH

=== Gallery of threaded connectors ===
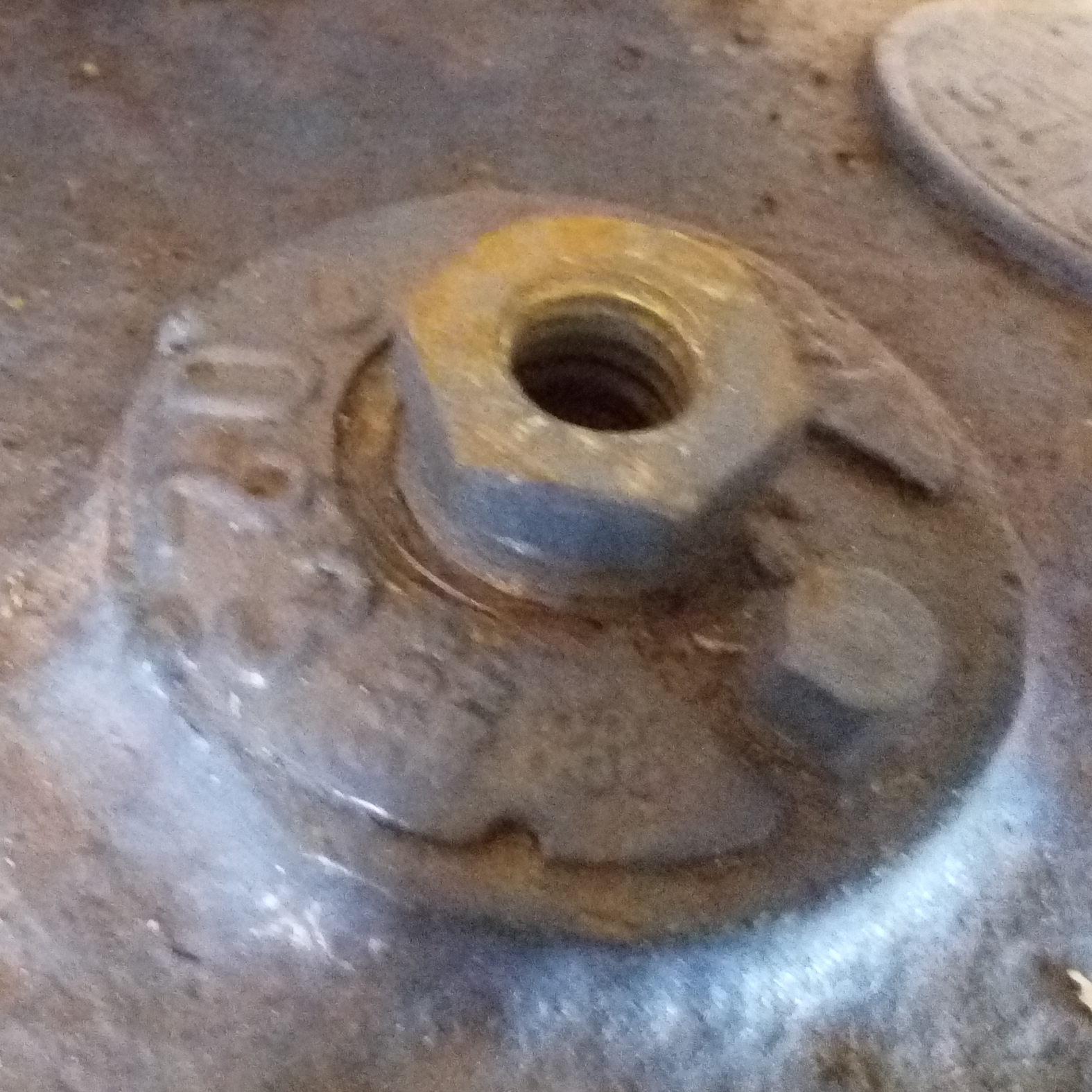
ABNT NBR 8473

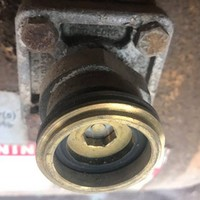
Acme

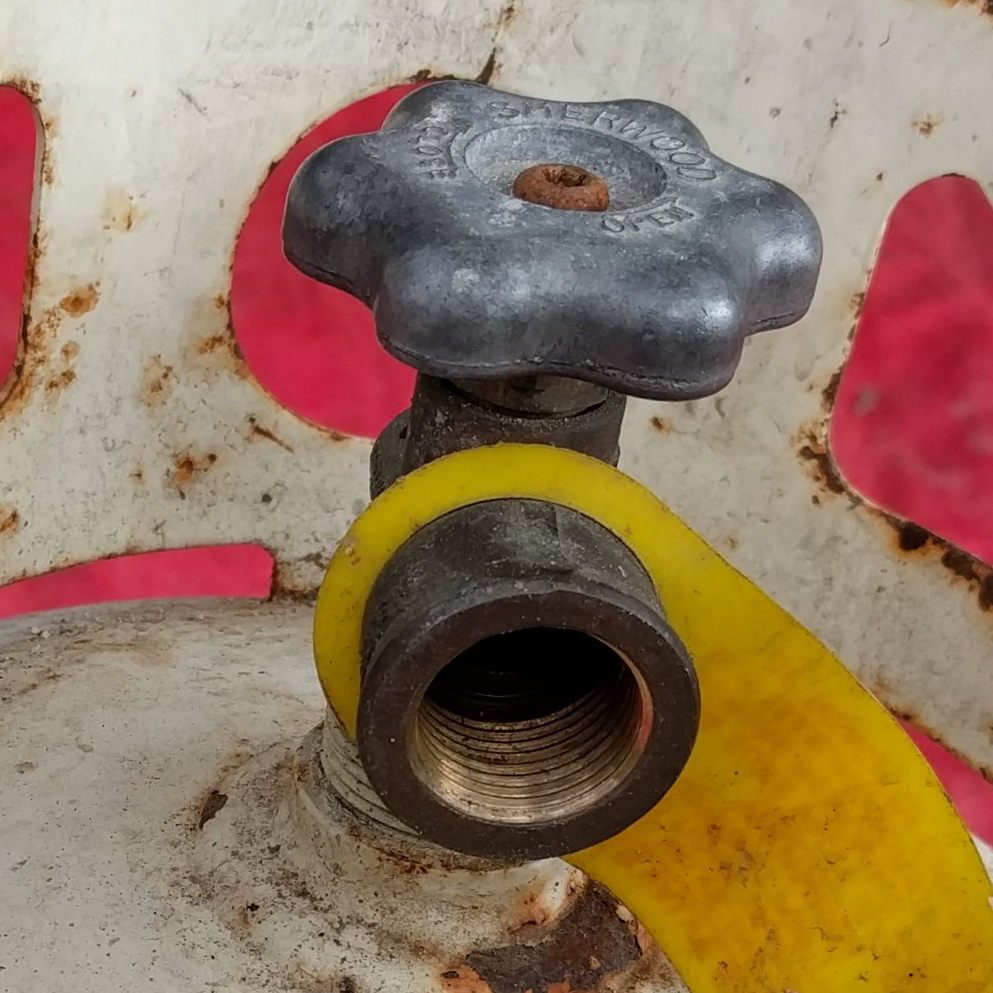
POL

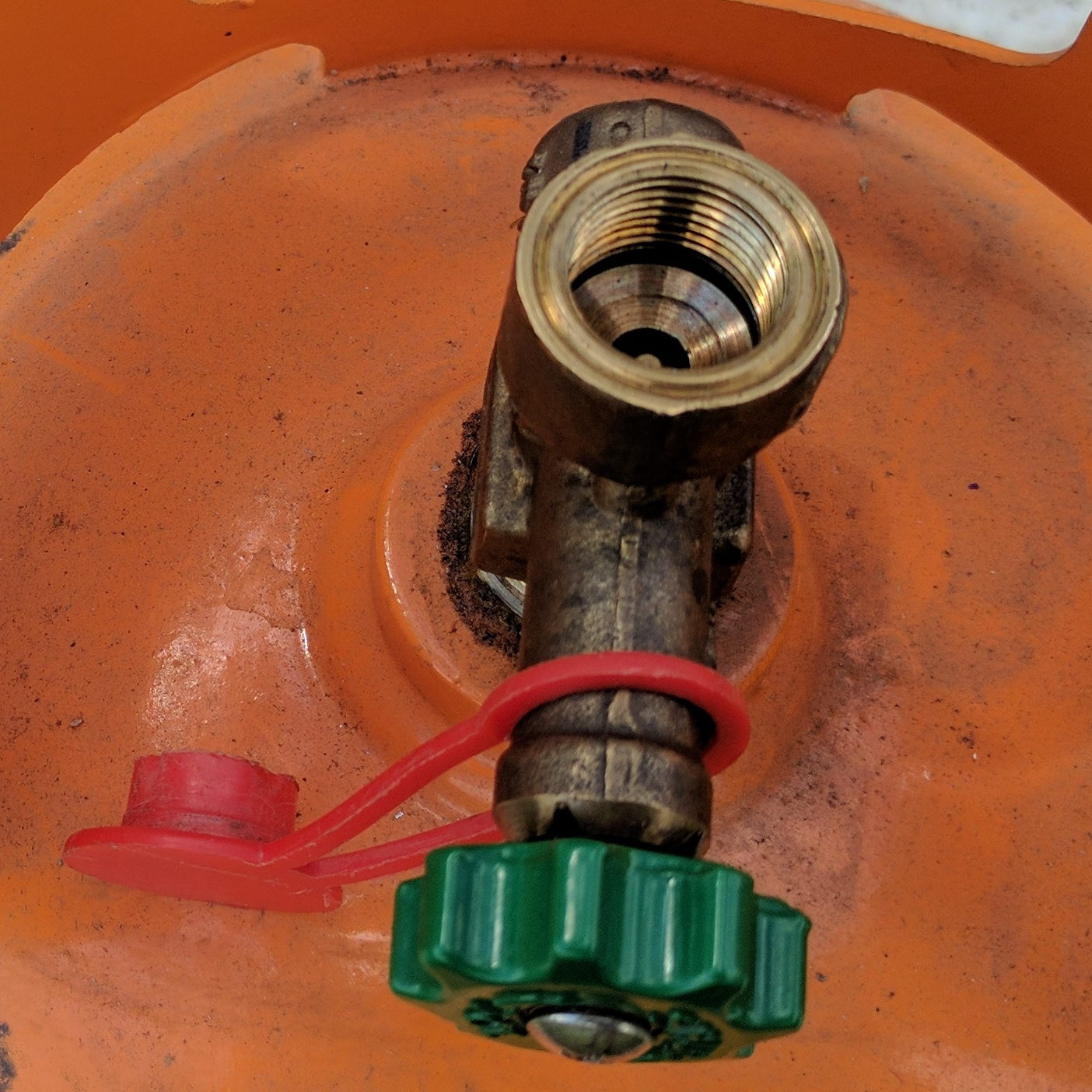
SANS 10019

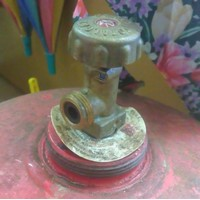
Shell F (G.2)

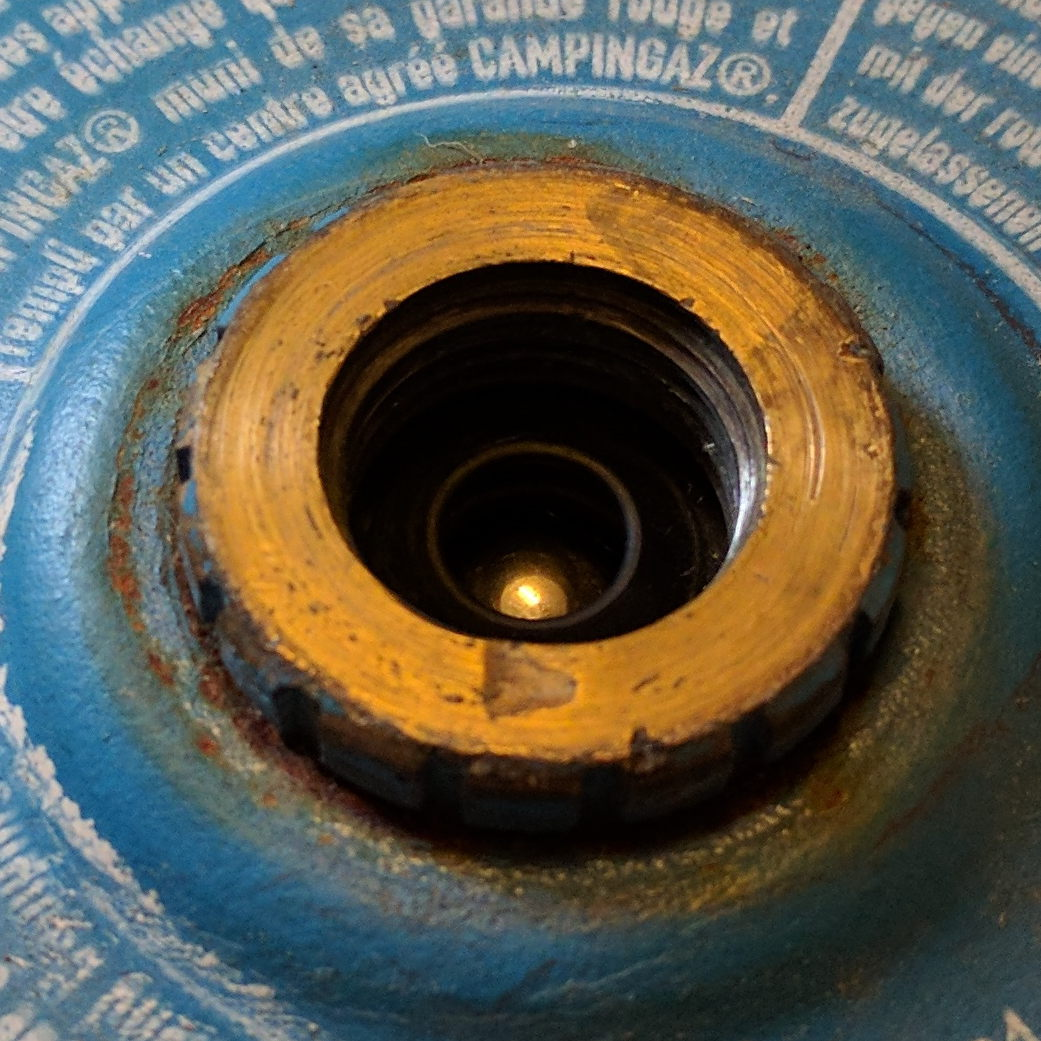
CampinGaz (G.3)

=== Gallery of quick coupling connectors ===
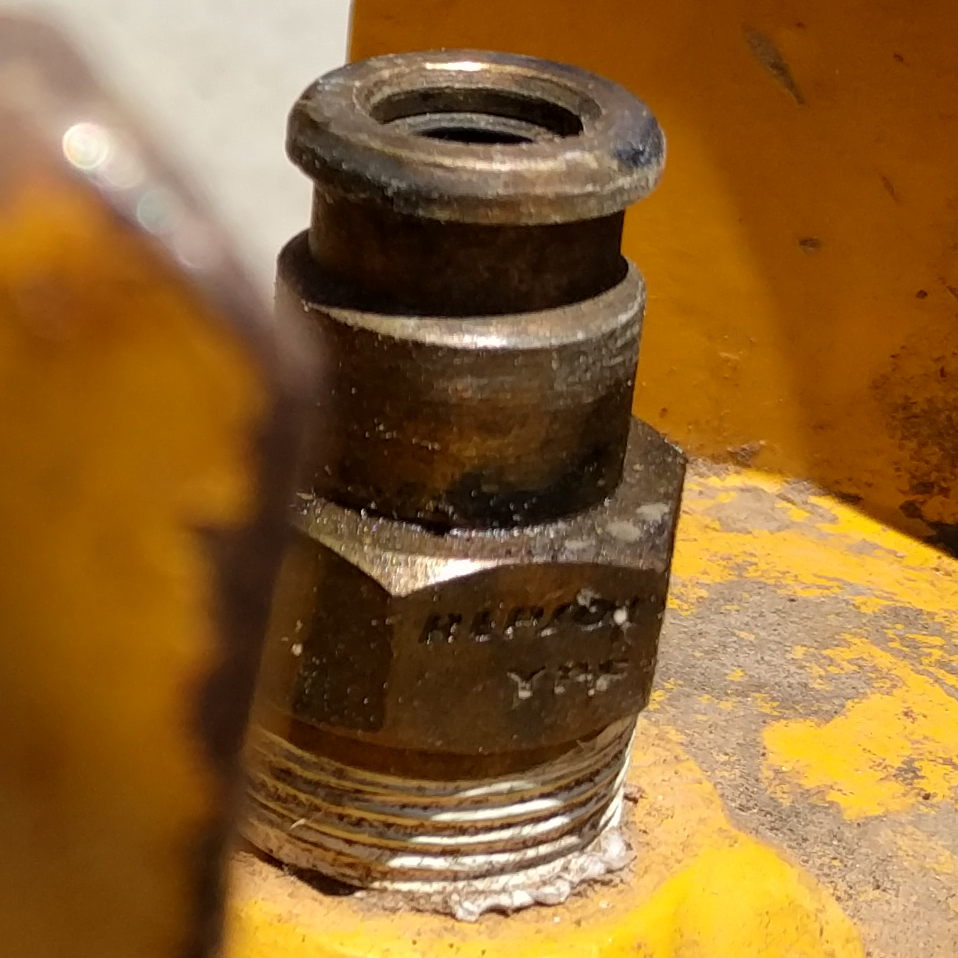
QC 22 mm

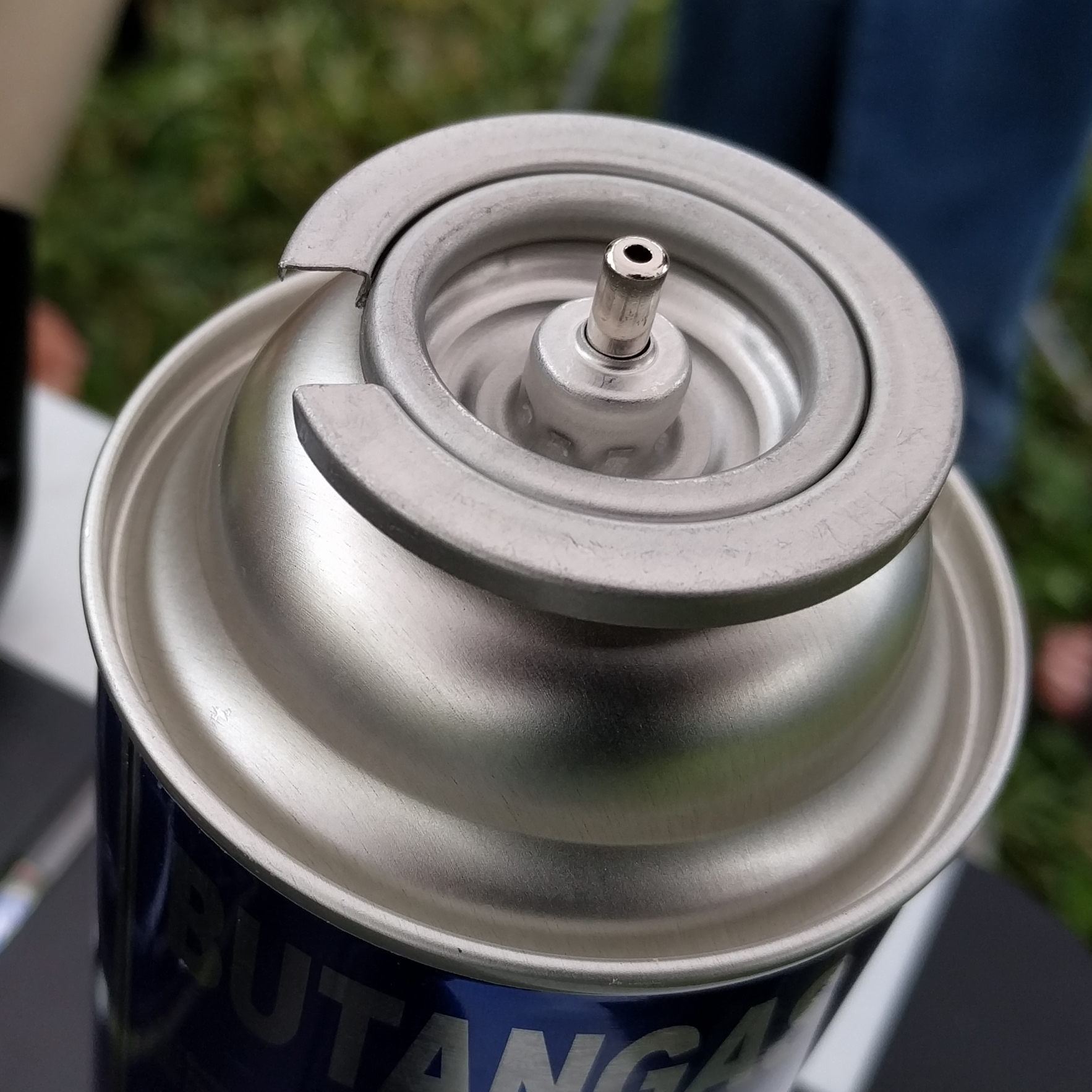
Butane Canister

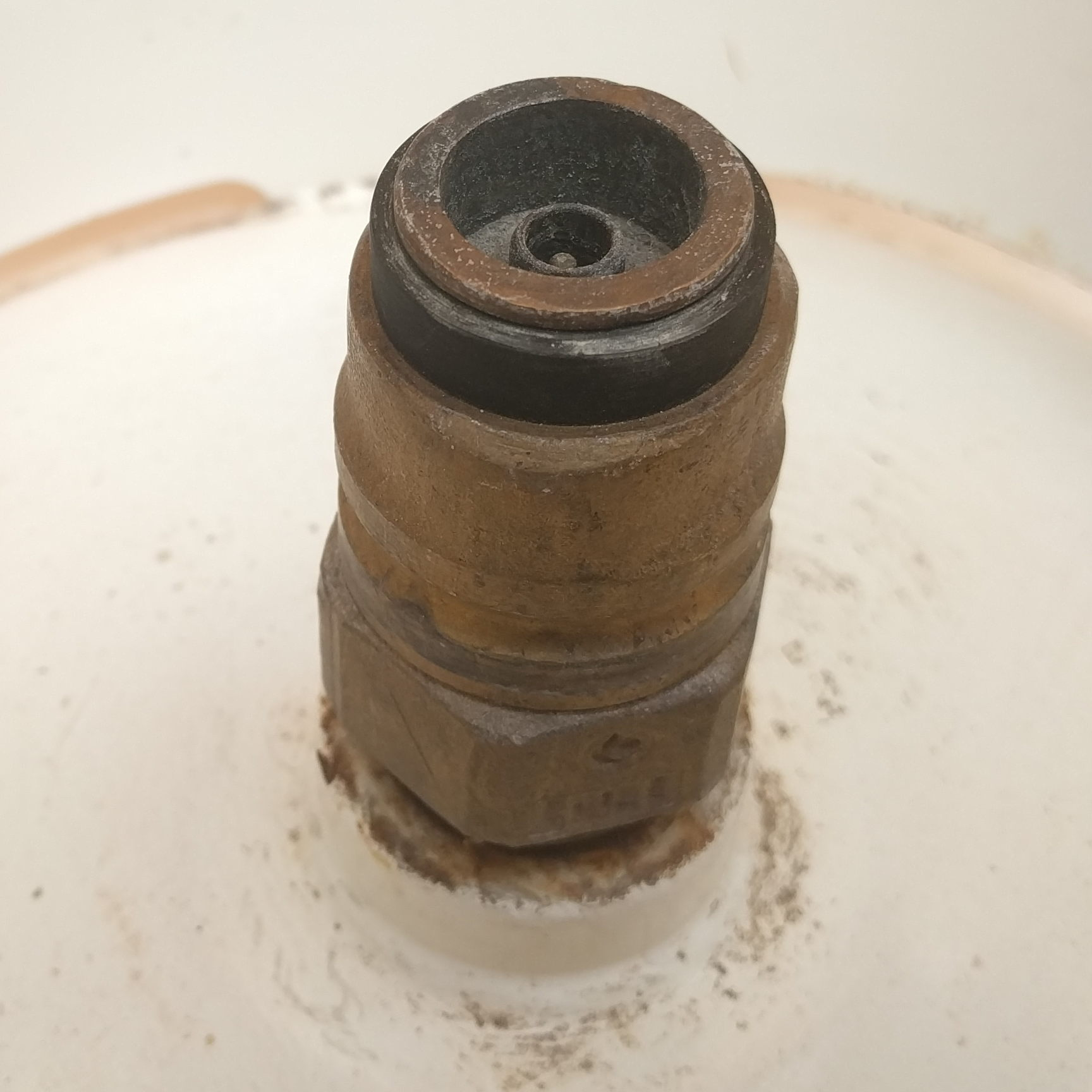
QC 35 mm Jumbo

== Standards in use per country ==
The list of standards in use per country shows per country for each application which connectors are use. In some countries multiple connectors are used for the same application.

Container Type	Continent	Country	Standard Name
Automotive	Africa	South Africa	Acme 1-3/4
Automotive	Americas	Argentina	Acme 1-3/4
Automotive	Americas	Argentina	Bayonet
Automotive	Americas	Argentina	Dish
Automotive	Americas	Bolivia	Acme 1-3/4
Automotive	Americas	Bolivia	Dish
Automotive	Americas	Canada	QCC Type 1 (G.9)
Automotive	Americas	Chile	Acme 1-3/4
Automotive	Americas	Chile	Dish
Automotive	Americas	Colombia	Acme 1-3/4
Automotive	Americas	Costa Rica	Dish
Automotive	Americas	Ecuador	Dish
Automotive	Americas	Mexico	Acme 1-3/4
Automotive	Americas	Paraguay	Acme 1-3/4
Automotive	Americas	Paraguay	Dish
Automotive	Americas	Peru	Dish
Automotive	Americas	Suriname	Acme 1-3/4
Automotive	Americas	Uruguay	Acme 1-3/4
Automotive	Americas	Venezuela	Dish
Automotive	Asia and Middle East	Azerbaijan	Acme 1-3/4
Automotive	Asia and Middle East	China	Acme 1-3/4
Automotive	Asia and Middle East	China	Dish
Automotive	Asia and Middle East	India	Dish
Automotive	Asia and Middle East	Kazakhstan	Dish
Automotive	Asia and Middle East	Kyrgyzstan	Dish
Automotive	Asia and Middle East	Mongolia	Dish
Automotive	Asia and Middle East	Nepal	Dish
Automotive	Asia and Middle East	Tajikistan	Dish
Automotive	Asia and Middle East	Turkey	Dish
Automotive	Europe	Albania	Dish
Automotive	Europe	Austria	Acme 1-3/4
Automotive	Europe	Austria	Dish
Automotive	Europe	Belarus	Dish
Automotive	Europe	Belgium	Acme 1-3/4
Automotive	Europe	Bosnia and Herzegovina	Dish
Automotive	Europe	Bulgaria	Dish
Automotive	Europe	Croatia	Acme 1-3/4
Automotive	Europe	Croatia	Dish
Automotive	Europe	Croatia	Ital. A (EN 16129 G.1)
Automotive	Europe	Czech Republic	Dish
Automotive	Europe	Denmark	Bayonet
Automotive	Europe	Denmark	Dish
Automotive	Europe	Estonia	Dish
Automotive	Europe	Finland	None - vehicle LPG not available
Automotive	Europe	France	Dish
Automotive	Europe	Germany	Acme 1-3/4
Automotive	Europe	Greece	Dish
Automotive	Europe	Hungary	Dish
Automotive	Europe	Ireland	Acme 1-3/4
Automotive	Europe	Italy	Dish
Automotive	Europe	Kosovo	Dish
Automotive	Europe	Latvia	Dish
Automotive	Europe	Lithuania	Dish
Automotive	Europe	Luxembourg	Acme 1-3/4
Automotive	Europe	Luxembourg	Bayonet
Automotive	Europe	Macedonia	Dish
Automotive	Europe	Malta	Dish
Automotive	Europe	Moldova	Dish
Automotive	Europe	Montenegro	Dish
Automotive	Europe	Netherlands	Bayonet
Automotive	Europe	Norway	Bayonet
Automotive	Europe	Norway	Dish
Automotive	Europe	Poland	Dish
Automotive	Europe	Portugal	Dish
Automotive	Europe	Romania	Dish
Automotive	Europe	Russia	Dish
Automotive	Europe	San Marino	Dish
Automotive	Europe	Serbia	Dish
Automotive	Europe	Slovakia	Dish
Automotive	Europe	Slovenia	Dish
Automotive	Europe	Spain	Bayonet
Automotive	Europe	Spain	Euro Nozzle
Automotive	Europe	Sweden	Dish
Automotive	Europe	Switzerland	Acme 1-3/4
Automotive	Europe	Switzerland	Dish
Automotive	Europe	Ukraine	Dish
Automotive	Europe	United Kingdom	Acme 1-3/4
Automotive	Europe	United Kingdom	Bayonet
Automotive	Oceanea	Australia	Acme 1-3/4
Automotive	Oceanea	Australia	Bayonet
Automotive	Oceanea	New Zealand	Bayonet
Disposable cylinders	Africa	Botswana	7/16" UNEF
Disposable cylinders	Africa	Cape Verde	Bayonet camping
Disposable cylinders	Africa	Côte d'Ivoire	Bayonet camping
Disposable cylinders	Africa	Kenya	Bayonet camping
Disposable cylinders	Africa	Malawi	7/16" UNEF
Disposable cylinders	Africa	Malawi	Bayonet camping
Disposable cylinders	Africa	Mauritania	Bayonet camping
Disposable cylinders	Africa	Morocco	Bayonet camping
Disposable cylinders	Africa	Namibia	7/16" UNEF
Disposable cylinders	Africa	Namibia	Bayonet camping
Disposable cylinders	Africa	Senegal	Bayonet camping
Disposable cylinders	Africa	South Africa	7/16" UNEF
Disposable cylinders	Africa	South Africa	Bayonet camping
Disposable cylinders	Africa	Tanzania	Bayonet camping
Disposable cylinders	Africa	Zambia	7/16" UNEF
Disposable cylinders	Americas	Argentina	7/16" UNEF
Disposable cylinders	Americas	Argentina	Butane Canister, 8-oz.
Disposable cylinders	Americas	Belize	Butane Canister, 8-oz.
Disposable cylinders	Americas	Brazil	Butane Canister, 8-oz.
Disposable cylinders	Americas	Canada	7/16" UNEF
Disposable cylinders	Americas	Canada	Bayonet camping
Disposable cylinders	Americas	Canada	Butane Canister, 8-oz.
Disposable cylinders	Americas	Canada	1" UNEF
Disposable cylinders	Americas	Canada	Propane bottle, 1 lb (16-oz.)
Disposable cylinders	Americas	Chile	7/16" UNEF
Disposable cylinders	Americas	Chile	Butane Canister, 8-oz.
Disposable cylinders	Americas	Colombia	7/16" UNEF
Disposable cylinders	Americas	Colombia	Butane Canister, 8-oz.
Disposable cylinders	Americas	Costa Rica	7/16" UNEF
Disposable cylinders	Americas	Costa Rica	Butane Canister, 8-oz.
Disposable cylinders	Americas	Ecuador	7/16" UNEF
Disposable cylinders	Americas	Guatemala	Butane Canister, 8-oz.
Disposable cylinders	Americas	Haiti	Bayonet camping
Disposable cylinders	Americas	Mexico	Butane Canister, 8-oz.
Disposable cylinders	Americas	Panama	7/16" UNEF
Disposable cylinders	Americas	Peru	7/16" UNEF
Disposable cylinders	Americas	United States	7/16" UNEF
Disposable cylinders	Americas	United States	Bayonet camping
Disposable cylinders	Americas	United States	Butane Canister, 8-oz.
Disposable cylinders	Americas	United States	1" UNEF
Disposable cylinders	Americas	United States	Propane bottle, 1 lb (16-oz.)
Disposable cylinders	Americas	Uruguay	Butane Canister, 8-oz.
Disposable cylinders	Asia and Middle East	India	7/16" UNEF
Disposable cylinders	Asia and Middle East	India	Bayonet camping
Disposable cylinders	Asia and Middle East	Israel	7/16" UNEF
Disposable cylinders	Asia and Middle East	Nepal	7/16" UNEF
Disposable cylinders	Asia and Middle East	Pakistan	7/16" UNEF
Disposable cylinders	Asia and Middle East	Pakistan	Bayonet camping
Disposable cylinders	Asia and Middle East	Philippines	Bayonet camping
Disposable cylinders	Asia and Middle East	Turkey	Bayonet camping
Disposable cylinders	Europe	Austria	7/16" UNEF
Disposable cylinders	Europe	Austria	Bayonet camping
Disposable cylinders	Europe	Belgium	7/16" UNEF
Disposable cylinders	Europe	Belgium	Bayonet camping
Disposable cylinders	Europe	Bulgaria	Bayonet camping
Disposable cylinders	Europe	Croatia	7/16" UNEF
Disposable cylinders	Europe	Croatia	Bayonet camping
Disposable cylinders	Europe	Czech Republic	7/16" UNEF
Disposable cylinders	Europe	Czech Republic	Bayonet camping
Disposable cylinders	Europe	Denmark	7/16" UNEF
Disposable cylinders	Europe	Denmark	Bayonet camping
Disposable cylinders	Europe	Estonia	7/16" UNEF
Disposable cylinders	Europe	Estonia	Bayonet camping
Disposable cylinders	Europe	Finland	7/16" UNEF
Disposable cylinders	Europe	Finland	Bayonet camping
Disposable cylinders	Europe	France	7/16" UNEF
Disposable cylinders	Europe	France	Bayonet camping
Disposable cylinders	Europe	Germany	7/16" UNEF
Disposable cylinders	Europe	Germany	Bayonet camping
Disposable cylinders	Europe	Greece	7/16" UNEF
Disposable cylinders	Europe	Greece	Bayonet camping
Disposable cylinders	Europe	Hungary	7/16" UNEF
Disposable cylinders	Europe	Hungary	Bayonet camping
Disposable cylinders	Europe	Iceland	7/16" UNEF
Disposable cylinders	Europe	Iceland	Bayonet camping
Disposable cylinders	Europe	Iceland	Butane Canister, 8-oz.
Disposable cylinders	Europe	Ireland	7/16" UNEF
Disposable cylinders	Europe	Ireland	Bayonet camping
Disposable cylinders	Europe	Italy	7/16" UNEF
Disposable cylinders	Europe	Italy	Bayonet camping
Disposable cylinders	Europe	Latvia	7/16" UNEF
Disposable cylinders	Europe	Latvia	Bayonet camping
Disposable cylinders	Europe	Lithuania	7/16" UNEF
Disposable cylinders	Europe	Lithuania	Bayonet camping
Disposable cylinders	Europe	Luxembourg	7/16" UNEF
Disposable cylinders	Europe	Luxembourg	Bayonet camping
Disposable cylinders	Europe	Netherlands	7/16" UNEF
Disposable cylinders	Europe	Netherlands	Bayonet camping
Disposable cylinders	Europe	Norway	Bayonet camping
Disposable cylinders	Europe	Poland	7/16" UNEF
Disposable cylinders	Europe	Poland	Bayonet camping
Disposable cylinders	Europe	Portugal	7/16" UNEF
Disposable cylinders	Europe	Portugal	Bayonet camping
Disposable cylinders	Europe	Romania	7/16" UNEF
Disposable cylinders	Europe	Romania	Bayonet camping
Disposable cylinders	Europe	Russia	Bayonet camping
Disposable cylinders	Europe	Slovakia	7/16" UNEF
Disposable cylinders	Europe	Slovakia	Bayonet camping
Disposable cylinders	Europe	Slovenia	Bayonet camping
Disposable cylinders	Europe	Spain	7/16" UNEF
Disposable cylinders	Europe	Spain	Bayonet camping
Disposable cylinders	Europe	Sweden	7/16" UNEF
Disposable cylinders	Europe	Sweden	Bayonet camping
Disposable cylinders	Europe	Switzerland	7/16" UNEF
Disposable cylinders	Europe	Switzerland	Bayonet camping
Disposable cylinders	Europe	Ukraine	Bayonet camping
Disposable cylinders	Europe	United Kingdom	7/16" UNEF
Disposable cylinders	Europe	United Kingdom	Bayonet camping
Permanent tanks	Americas	Canada	Acme 1-3/4
Permanent tanks	Americas	United States	Acme 1-3/4
Portable cylinders	Africa	Botswana	POL 105 (EN 16129 G.7)
Portable cylinders	Africa	Botswana	POL US (G.9)
Portable cylinders	Africa	Botswana	SANS 10019 small cylinders
Portable cylinders	Africa	Cape Verde	Gaz (G.3)
Portable cylinders	Africa	Côte d'Ivoire	Gaz (G.3)
Portable cylinders	Africa	Kenya	Camping gas VBC02 (G.3)
Portable cylinders	Africa	Malawi	POL 105 (EN 16129 G.7)
Portable cylinders	Africa	Malawi	SANS 10019 small cylinders
Portable cylinders	Africa	Mauritania	Gaz (G.3)
Portable cylinders	Africa	Morocco	Gaz (G.3)
Portable cylinders	Africa	Namibia	POL 105 (EN 16129 G.7)
Portable cylinders	Africa	Namibia	POL US (G.9)
Portable cylinders	Africa	Namibia	SANS 10019 small cylinders
Portable cylinders	Africa	Senegal	Gaz (G.3)
Portable cylinders	Africa	South Africa	Camping gas VBC03 (G.33)
Portable cylinders	Africa	South Africa	POL 105 (EN 16129 G.7)
Portable cylinders	Africa	South Africa	POL US (G.9)
Portable cylinders	Africa	South Africa	SANS 10019 small cylinders
Portable cylinders	Africa	Zambia	POL 105 (EN 16129 G.7)
Portable cylinders	Africa	Zambia	SANS 10019 small cylinders
Portable cylinders	Africa	Zimbabwe	POL 105 (EN 16129 G.7)
Portable cylinders	Africa	Zimbabwe	SANS 10019 small cylinders
Portable cylinders	Americas	Argentina	DIN 477-1 No. 4
Portable cylinders	Americas	Argentina	POL US (G.9)
Portable cylinders	Americas	Bahamas	POL US (G.9)
Portable cylinders	Americas	Barbados	POL US (G.9)
Portable cylinders	Americas	Bermuda	POL US (G.9)
Portable cylinders	Americas	Bolivia	POL US (G.9)
Portable cylinders	Americas	Brazil	ABNT NBR 13794
Portable cylinders	Americas	Brazil	ABNT NBR 8614 a
Portable cylinders	Americas	Brazil	ABNT NBR 8614 b
Portable cylinders	Americas	Brazil	POL US (G.9)
Portable cylinders	Americas	Canada	POL US (G.9)
Portable cylinders	Americas	Canada	QCC Type 1 (G.9)
Portable cylinders	Americas	Chile	POL US (G.9)
Portable cylinders	Americas	Chile	QCC Type 1 (G.9)
Portable cylinders	Americas	Chile	Quick coupling 35 mm Jumbo (G.56)
Portable cylinders	Americas	Colombia	POL US (G.9)
Portable cylinders	Americas	Colombia	Quick coupling 22 mm (G.54)
Portable cylinders	Americas	Costa Rica	POL US (G.9)
Portable cylinders	Americas	Ecuador	Quick coupling 22 mm (G.54)
Portable cylinders	Americas	French Guiana	EU-Shell (G.8)
Portable cylinders	Americas	Guatemala	POL US (G.9)
Portable cylinders	Americas	Guyana	POL US (G.9)
Portable cylinders	Americas	Guyana	Quick coupling 35 mm Jumbo (G.56)
Portable cylinders	Americas	Haiti	Gaz (G.3)
Portable cylinders	Americas	Haiti	VP02 (G.9)
Portable cylinders	Americas	Honduras	POL US (G.9)
Portable cylinders	Americas	Jamaica	Bayonet
Portable cylinders	Americas	Nicaragua	POL US (G.9)
Portable cylinders	Americas	Paraguay	POL US (G.9)
Portable cylinders	Americas	Paraguay	VP02 (G.9)
Portable cylinders	Americas	Paraguay	VP03 (G.9)
Portable cylinders	Americas	Peru	POL US (G.9)
Portable cylinders	Americas	Peru	Quick coupling 20 mm (G.52)
Portable cylinders	Americas	Suriname	POL US (G.9)
Portable cylinders	Americas	United States	POL US (G.9)
Portable cylinders	Americas	United States	QCC Type 1 (G.9)
Portable cylinders	Americas	Venezuela	POL US (G.9)
Portable cylinders	Asia and Middle East	Brunei	POL US (G.9)
Portable cylinders	Asia and Middle East	Hong Kong	Quick coupling 20 mm (G.52)
Portable cylinders	Asia and Middle East	Hong Kong	VP01 (G.9)
Portable cylinders	Asia and Middle East	Hong Kong	VP03 (G.9)
Portable cylinders	Asia and Middle East	India	Gaz (G.3)
Portable cylinders	Asia and Middle East	India	IS-8737
Portable cylinders	Asia and Middle East	Indonesia	SNI 1591 : 2008 a
Portable cylinders	Asia and Middle East	Indonesia	SNI 1591 : 2008 b
Portable cylinders	Asia and Middle East	Indonesia	SNI 1591 : 2008 c
Portable cylinders	Asia and Middle East	Japan	KHK S0126 clip on
Portable cylinders	Asia and Middle East	Myanmar	POL US (G.9)
Portable cylinders	Asia and Middle East	Pakistan	Gaz (G.3)
Portable cylinders	Asia and Middle East	Philippines	Bayonet
Portable cylinders	Asia and Middle East	Philippines	Gaz (G.3)
Portable cylinders	Asia and Middle East	Turkey	Gaz (G.3)
Portable cylinders	Asia and Middle East	Turkey	Ital. A (EN 16129 G.1)
Portable cylinders	Europe	Austria	1 ¾" x 6 ACME (G.31)
Portable cylinders	Europe	Austria	Gaz (G.3)
Portable cylinders	Europe	Austria	GF – Grossflasche (G.04)
Portable cylinders	Europe	Austria	KLF – Kleinflasche (G.12)
Portable cylinders	Europe	Belgium	1 ¾" x 6 ACME (G.31)
Portable cylinders	Europe	Belgium	EU-Shell (G.8)
Portable cylinders	Europe	Belgium	G 3/8 LH EN ISO 228-1 (G.25)
Portable cylinders	Europe	Belgium	Gaz (G.3)
Portable cylinders	Europe	Belgium	KLF – Kleinflasche (G.12)
Portable cylinders	Europe	Belgium	Liquid withdrawal VL07
Portable cylinders	Europe	Belgium	POL-WS (G.10)
Portable cylinders	Europe	Belgium	Quick coupling 27 mm (G.59)
Portable cylinders	Europe	Belgium	Shell-F (G.2)
Portable cylinders	Europe	Bosnia and Herzegovina	KLF – Kleinflasche (G.12)
Portable cylinders	Europe	Bulgaria	Gaz (G.3)
Portable cylinders	Europe	Croatia	EU-Shell (G.8)
Portable cylinders	Europe	Croatia	Gaz (G.3)
Portable cylinders	Europe	Croatia	Shell-F (G.2)
Portable cylinders	Europe	Cyprus	Quick coupling 35 mm Jumbo (G.56)
Portable cylinders	Europe	Czech Republic	1 ¾" x 6 ACME (G.31)
Portable cylinders	Europe	Czech Republic	EU-Shell (G.8)
Portable cylinders	Europe	Czech Republic	Gaz (G.3)
Portable cylinders	Europe	Czech Republic	GF – Grossflasche (G.04)
Portable cylinders	Europe	Czech Republic	KLF – Kleinflasche (G.12)
Portable cylinders	Europe	Czech Republic	POL US (G.9)
Portable cylinders	Europe	Czech Republic	Shell-F (G.2)
Portable cylinders	Europe	Denmark	1 ¾" x 6 ACME (G.31)
Portable cylinders	Europe	Denmark	EU-Shell (G.8)
Portable cylinders	Europe	Denmark	G 3/8 LH (G.33)
Portable cylinders	Europe	Denmark	Gaz (G.3)
Portable cylinders	Europe	Denmark	GF – Grossflasche (G.04)
Portable cylinders	Europe	Denmark	KLF – Kleinflasche (G.12)
Portable cylinders	Europe	Denmark	POL US (G.9)
Portable cylinders	Europe	Denmark	Primus (G.32)
Portable cylinders	Europe	Denmark	Quick coupling 16 mm (G.50)
Portable cylinders	Europe	Denmark	Quick coupling 19 mm (G.51)
Portable cylinders	Europe	Denmark	Quick coupling 20 mm (G.52)
Portable cylinders	Europe	Denmark	Quick coupling 21 mm (G.53)
Portable cylinders	Europe	Denmark	Quick coupling 22 mm (G.54)
Portable cylinders	Europe	Denmark	Quick coupling 35 mm Jumbo (G.56)
Portable cylinders	Europe	Denmark	Shell-F (G.2)
Portable cylinders	Europe	Denmark	W 22 x 1,155 LH (G.06)
Portable cylinders	Europe	Estonia	Gaz (G.3)
Portable cylinders	Europe	Finland	1 1/4" x 5 ACME (G.29)
Portable cylinders	Europe	Finland	EU-Shell (G.8)
Portable cylinders	Europe	Finland	Gaz (G.3)
Portable cylinders	Europe	Finland	KLF – Kleinflasche (G.12)
Portable cylinders	Europe	Finland	Quick coupling 35 mm Jumbo (G.56)
Portable cylinders	Europe	Finland	Shell-F (G.2)
Portable cylinders	Europe	Finland	W 21,8 x 1,814 LH – 55° (G.05)
Portable cylinders	Europe	France	EU-Shell (G.8)
Portable cylinders	Europe	France	Gaz (G.3)
Portable cylinders	Europe	France	Quick coupling 20 mm (G.52)
Portable cylinders	Europe	France	Quick coupling 21.7 mm threaded (G.57)
Portable cylinders	Europe	France	Quick coupling 27 mm (G.59)
Portable cylinders	Europe	France	Quick coupling 35 mm Jumbo (G.56)
Portable cylinders	Europe	France	Quick Coupling Fork Lift (G.66)
Portable cylinders	Europe	France	Quick Coupling Fork Lift Bayonet (G.65)
Portable cylinders	Europe	France	Shell-F (G.2)
Portable cylinders	Europe	Germany	1 ¾" x 6 ACME (G.31)
Portable cylinders	Europe	Germany	G 3/8 LH EN ISO 228-1 (G.25)
Portable cylinders	Europe	Germany	Gaz (G.3)
Portable cylinders	Europe	Germany	GF – Grossflasche (G.04)
Portable cylinders	Europe	Germany	KLF – Kleinflasche (G.12)
Portable cylinders	Europe	Germany	POL US (G.9)
Portable cylinders	Europe	Germany	W 21,8 x 1,814 LH (G.19)
Portable cylinders	Europe	Greece	1 ¾" x 6 ACME (G.31)
Portable cylinders	Europe	Greece	Gaz (G.3)
Portable cylinders	Europe	Greece	Ital. A (EN 16129 G.1)
Portable cylinders	Europe	Greece	Quick coupling 20 mm (G.52)
Portable cylinders	Europe	Greece	Quick coupling 22 mm (G.54)
Portable cylinders	Europe	Greece	Quick coupling 24.4 mm (G.58)
Portable cylinders	Europe	Greece	Quick coupling 24.5 mm (G.55)
Portable cylinders	Europe	Hungary	EU-Shell (G.8)
Portable cylinders	Europe	Hungary	Gaz (G.3)
Portable cylinders	Europe	Hungary	Shell-F (G.2)
Portable cylinders	Europe	Iceland	EU-Shell (G.8)
Portable cylinders	Europe	Iceland	Gaz (G.3)
Portable cylinders	Europe	Iceland	POL-WS (G.10)
Portable cylinders	Europe	Iceland	Primus (G.32)
Portable cylinders	Europe	Iceland	Shell-F (G.2)
Portable cylinders	Europe	Ireland	1 ¾" x 6 ACME (G.31)
Portable cylinders	Europe	Ireland	1 1/4" x 5 ACME (G.29)
Portable cylinders	Europe	Ireland	EU-Shell (G.8)
Portable cylinders	Europe	Ireland	Gaz (G.3)
Portable cylinders	Europe	Ireland	Neck valve 20 mm (G.64)
Portable cylinders	Europe	Ireland	POL 105 (EN 16129 G.7)
Portable cylinders	Europe	Ireland	Quick coupling 20 mm (G.52)
Portable cylinders	Europe	Ireland	Quick coupling 21 mm (G.53)
Portable cylinders	Europe	Ireland	Quick coupling 27 mm (G.59)
Portable cylinders	Europe	Ireland	Quick coupling 35 mm Jumbo (G.56)
Portable cylinders	Europe	Italy	1 ¾" x 6 ACME (G.31)
Portable cylinders	Europe	Italy	Gaz (G.3)
Portable cylinders	Europe	Italy	Ital. A (EN 16129 G.1)
Portable cylinders	Europe	Italy	Quick coupling 20 mm (G.52)
Portable cylinders	Europe	Italy	Quick coupling 22 mm (G.54)
Portable cylinders	Europe	Italy	Quick coupling 24.4 mm (G.58)
Portable cylinders	Europe	Italy	Quick coupling 24.5 mm (G.55)
Portable cylinders	Europe	Latvia	Gaz (G.3)
Portable cylinders	Europe	Lithuania	Gaz (G.3)
Portable cylinders	Europe	Luxembourg	EU-Shell (G.8)
Portable cylinders	Europe	Luxembourg	Gaz (G.3)
Portable cylinders	Europe	Luxembourg	Shell-F (G.2)
Portable cylinders	Europe	Macedonia	Ital. A (EN 16129 G.1)
Portable cylinders	Europe	Malta	Ital. A (EN 16129 G.1)
Portable cylinders	Europe	Malta	Quick coupling 22 mm (G.54)
Portable cylinders	Europe	Netherlands	EU-Shell (G.8)
Portable cylinders	Europe	Netherlands	G 3/8 LH EN ISO 228-1 (G.25)
Portable cylinders	Europe	Netherlands	Gaz (G.3)
Portable cylinders	Europe	Netherlands	KLF – Kleinflasche (G.12)
Portable cylinders	Europe	Netherlands	SAEF 1/2"
Portable cylinders	Europe	Netherlands	Shell-F (G.2)
Portable cylinders	Europe	Norway	EU-Shell (G.8)
Portable cylinders	Europe	Norway	Gaz (G.3)
Portable cylinders	Europe	Norway	POL US (G.9)
Portable cylinders	Europe	Norway	POL-WS (G.10)
Portable cylinders	Europe	Norway	Primus (G.32)
Portable cylinders	Europe	Norway	Quick coupling 20 mm (G.52)
Portable cylinders	Europe	Poland	G 3/8 LH (G.33)
Portable cylinders	Europe	Poland	Gaz (G.3)
Portable cylinders	Europe	Poland	GF – Grossflasche (G.04)
Portable cylinders	Europe	Poland	KLF – Kleinflasche (G.12)
Portable cylinders	Europe	Poland	POL US (G.9)
Portable cylinders	Europe	Poland	Quick coupling 27 mm (G.59)
Portable cylinders	Europe	Poland	Shell-F (G.2)
Portable cylinders	Europe	Portugal	Gaz (G.3)
Portable cylinders	Europe	Portugal	POL US (G.9)
Portable cylinders	Europe	Portugal	POL-WS (G.10)
Portable cylinders	Europe	Portugal	Primus (G.32)
Portable cylinders	Europe	Portugal	Quick coupling 20 mm (G.52)
Portable cylinders	Europe	Portugal	Quick coupling 22 mm (G.54)
Portable cylinders	Europe	Portugal	Quick coupling 24.5 mm (G.60)
Portable cylinders	Europe	Portugal	Quick coupling 27 mm (G.59)
Portable cylinders	Europe	Portugal	Quick coupling 35 mm Jumbo (G.56)
Portable cylinders	Europe	Portugal	Quick coupling bayonet (G.61)
Portable cylinders	Europe	Russia	EU-Shell (G.8)
Portable cylinders	Europe	Russia	Gaz (G.3)
Portable cylinders	Europe	Russia	GF – Grossflasche (G.04)
Portable cylinders	Europe	Russia	KLF – Kleinflasche (G.12)
Portable cylinders	Europe	Russia	POL US (G.9)
Portable cylinders	Europe	Russia	Shell-F (G.2)
Portable cylinders	Europe	Serbia	EU-Shell (G.8)
Portable cylinders	Europe	Serbia	Shell-F (G.2)
Portable cylinders	Europe	Slovakia	EU-Shell (G.8)
Portable cylinders	Europe	Slovakia	Gaz (G.3
Portable cylinders	Europe	Slovakia	Shell-F (G.2)
Portable cylinders	Europe	Slovenia	EU-Shell (G.8)
Portable cylinders	Europe	Slovenia	Gaz (G.3)
Portable cylinders	Europe	Slovenia	GF – Grossflasche (G.04)
Portable cylinders	Europe	Slovenia	KLF – Kleinflasche (G.12)
Portable cylinders	Europe	Slovenia	Shell-F (G.2)
Portable cylinders	Europe	Spain	1 ¾" x 6 ACME (G.31)
Portable cylinders	Europe	Spain	EU-Shell (G.8)
Portable cylinders	Europe	Spain	Gaz (G.3)
Portable cylinders	Europe	Spain	Quick coupling 20 mm (G.52)
Portable cylinders	Europe	Spain	Quick coupling 35 mm Jumbo (G.56)
Portable cylinders	Europe	Spain	Shell-F (G.2)
Portable cylinders	Europe	Spain	Threaded connection W 14,8 x 1/18 (G.21)
Portable cylinders	Europe	Sweden	1 1/4" x 5 ACME (G.29)
Portable cylinders	Europe	Sweden	Gaz (G.3)
Portable cylinders	Europe	Sweden	POL US (G.9)
Portable cylinders	Europe	Sweden	POL-WS (G.10)
Portable cylinders	Europe	Sweden	Primus (G.32)
Portable cylinders	Europe	Sweden	Quick coupling 35 mm Jumbo (G.56)
Portable cylinders	Europe	Switzerland	1 ¾" x 6 ACME (G.31)
Portable cylinders	Europe	Switzerland	Gaz (G.3)
Portable cylinders	Europe	Switzerland	Shell-F (G.2)
Portable cylinders	Europe	Ukraine	Gaz (G.3)
Portable cylinders	Europe	United Kingdom	1 1/4" x 5 ACME (G.29)
Portable cylinders	Europe	United Kingdom	1 1/4" x 5 ACME LH (G.30)
Portable cylinders	Europe	United Kingdom	EU-Shell (G.8)
Portable cylinders	Europe	United Kingdom	Gaz (G.3)
Portable cylinders	Europe	United Kingdom	POL 105 (EN 16129 G.7)
Portable cylinders	Europe	United Kingdom	Primus (G.32)
Portable cylinders	Europe	United Kingdom	Quick coupling 20 mm (G.52)
Portable cylinders	Europe	United Kingdom	Quick coupling 21 mm (G.53)
Portable cylinders	Europe	United Kingdom	Quick coupling 22 mm (G.54)
Portable cylinders	Europe	United Kingdom	Quick coupling 27 mm (G.59)
Portable cylinders	Europe	United Kingdom	Quick coupling 35 mm Jumbo (G.56)
Portable cylinders	Oceanea	Australia	DIN 477-1 No. 4
Portable cylinders	Oceanea	Australia	POL US (G.9)
Portable cylinders	Oceanea	Australia	Primus (G.32)
Portable cylinders	Oceanea	New Zealand	DIN 477-1 No. 4
Portable cylinders	Oceanea	New Zealand	QCC Type 1 (G.9)
Portable cylinders	Oceanea	New Zealand	VP01 (G.9)
