= Mayor Smith =

Mayor Smith may refer to:

== Australia ==
- Alexander Kennedy Smith (1824–1881), mayor of Melbourne, Victoria (1875–1876)
- Charles Throsby Smith (1798–1876), mayor of Wollongong, New South Wales
- David Smith (Western Australian politician) (1943–2026), mayor of Bunbury, Western Australia (2005–2013)
- Edwin Thomas Smith (1830–1919), mayor of Kensington and Norwood (1867–1870; 1871–1873) and Adelaide (1879–1882; 1886–1888)
- Harold Gengoult Smith (1890–1983), Lord Mayor of Melbourne (1931–1934)
- Jacob Smith (politician) (c. 1816–1891), mayor of Port Adelaide, South Australia (1859–1863; 1864–1866)
- James Francis Smith (politician) (c. 1844–1908), mayor of Newtown, New South Wales (1877–1878; 1879–1880; 1884–1886; 1896–1897)
- James Joynton Smith (1858–1943), Lord Mayor of Sydney (1918)
- John Smith (Victoria politician) (1816–1879), mayor of Melbourne, Victoria (1851–1853; 1854–1856; 1857–1858; 1860–1861; 1863–1864)
- Luke Smith (politician), mayor of Logan City, Queensland (2016–2019)
- Staniforth Smith (1869–1934), mayor of Kalgoorlie, Western Australia (1900–1901)
- Sydney Smith (Australian politician) (1856–1934), mayor of Leichhardt, New South Wales (1888–1889)
- Thomas Smith (Australian politician) (1846–1925), mayor of South Melbourne (1888) and Port Melbourne (1906–1907; 1914–1915; 1920–1921)
- Tim Smith (Australian politician) (born 1983), mayor of Stonnington, Victoria

== Canada ==
- Bill Smith (Alberta politician) (born 1934), mayor of Edmonton, Alberta (1995–2004)
- Brian Smith (Canadian politician) (born 1934), mayor of Oak Bay, British Columbia (1974–1979)
- Ernest A. Smith (1864–1952), mayor of Shediac, New Brunswick (1906–1907)
- Frank Smith (Canadian politician) (1822–1901), mayor of London, Ontario
- George Wilbert Smith (1855–1931), mayor of Red Deer, Alberta (1916–1918)
- Gerald Smith (Canadian politician) (born 1943), mayor of Lourdes, Newfoundland and Labrador
- Graydon Smith, mayor of Bracebridge, Ontario (2010–2022)
- Jacob W. Smith (1851–1926), mayor of Regina, Saskatchewan (1899; 1902–1903; 1907–1908)
- James Edward Smith (politician) (1831–1892), mayor of Toronto, Ontario (1867–1869)
- John Smith (Kent MPP), mayor of Chatham, Ontario
- John Shuter Smith (c. 1813–1871), mayor of Port Hope, Canada West (1852; 1854–1855; 1868)
- Justus Albert Smith (1894–1971), mayor of Kitchener, Ontario (1935–1937)
- Mike Smith (Nova Scotia politician), mayor of Colchester County, Nova Scotia (2000–2008)
- Percy Smith (Canadian politician) (1921–2009), mayor of Newcastle, New Brunswick
- Robert Knowlton Smith (1887–1973), mayor of Amherst, Nova Scotia (1923)
- Ron Smith (ice hockey, born 1952), mayor of Port Hope, Ontario (1994–2000)

== England ==
- Bernard Smith (MP) (c. 1522–1591), mayor of Totnes (1549–1550; c. 1565 – c. 1566)
- Bracewell Smith (1884–1966), Lord Mayor of London (1946–1947)
- Charlie Smith (Romani poet) (1956–2005), mayor of Castle Point (2002–2003)
- Christopher Smith (MP, died 1835), Lord Mayor of London (1817–1818)
- Cyril Smith (1928–2010), mayor of Rochdale
- David Smith (British Conservative politician) (1826–1886), mayor of Brighton (1880–1881)
- Emily Smith (mayor), mayor of Coventry (1942–1943)
- George Smith (MP for Exeter) (died 1619), mayor of Exeter (1586–1587; 1597–1598; 1607–1608)
- Herbert Smith (trade unionist) (1862–1938), mayor of Barnsley (1932)
- John Smith (Cavalier, born 1608) (c. 1608–1657), mayor of Oxford (1639)
- Joseph Crowther Smith (1818–1886), mayor of Wolverhampton (1865–1866)
- Lawrence Smith (MP) (1515/1516–1582), mayor of Chester (1540–1541; 1558–1559; 1563–1564; 1570–1571)
- Len Smith (trade unionist) (1879–1964), mayor of Northampton (1949–1950)
- Norman Smith (mayor) (1919–1993), mayor of Lewisham (1983–1984; 1986–1988)
- Richard Smith (died 1581) (fl. 1516–1581), mayor of Newcastle-under-Lyme (1547–1548; 1549–1550)
- Samuel Pountney Smith (1812–1883), mayor of Shrewsbury (1873–1874)
- Thomas Smith (Chester MP), mayor of Chester (1622)
- Thomas Smith (Lord Mayor of London) (1746–1823), Lord Mayor of London (1809)
- Thomas Smith (trade unionist) (1847–1919), mayor of Leicester (1907–1908)
- William Robert Smith (physician) (1850–1932), mayor of Holborn (1893–1896)

== United States ==
=== 21st century ===
- Smith Joseph (born 1961), mayor of North Miami, Florida (2014–2019)
- Chuck Smith (baseball) (born 1968), mayor of Woodmere, Ohio
- James E. Smith (Montana politician) (born 1948), mayor of Helena, Montana (2001–2018)
- Jaylen Smith (politician) (born 2003/2004), mayor of Earle, Arkansas (2023–present)
- Jimmie Smith (Mississippi politician), mayor of Meridian, Mississippi (2021–2025)
- John Robert Smith, mayor of Meridian, Mississippi (1993–2009)
- Kandie Smith (born 1969), mayor of Greenville, North Carolina (2017)
- L. Harvey Smith (born 1948), acting mayor of Jersey City, New Jersey (2004)
- Ralph K. Smith (born 1942), mayor of Roanoke, Virginia (2000–2004)
- Sally Smith (politician) (born 1945), mayor of Juneau, Alaska (2000–2003)
- Scott Smith (American politician) (born 1956), mayor of Mesa, Arizona (2008–2014)

=== 20th century ===
- August E. Smith (1879–1969), mayor of Viroqua, Wisconsin
- Benjamin A. Smith II (1916–1991), mayor of Gloucester, Massachusetts (1954–1955)
- Bob Smith (New Jersey politician) (born 1947), mayor of Piscataway, New Jersey (1981–1986)
- Bradford S. Smith (born 1950), mayor of Cinnaminson Township, New Jersey (1979; 1982)
- Bryce B. Smith (1878–1962), mayor of Kansas City, Missouri (1930–1940)
- Charles L. Smith (Seattle politician) (1892–1982), mayor of Seattle, Washington (1934–1936)
- Clarence W. Smith (1855–1937), mayor of Johnstown, New York (1914–1915; 1918–1919)
- Curtis P. Smith (1863–1919), mayor of Dallas, Texas (1906–1907)
- Earl E. T. Smith (1903–1991), mayor of Palm Beach, Florida (1971–1977)
- Edward Clarke Smith (1864–1926), mayor of Manchester, New Hampshire (1911–1912)
- Edward L. Smith (1875–1923), mayor of Hartford, Connecticut (1910–1912)
- Edward Parsons Smith (1860–1930), mayor of Omaha, Nebraska (1918–1921)
- Elmo Smith (1909–1968), mayor of Ontario, Oregon (1940–1943)
- Erastus G. Smith (1855–1937), mayor of Beloit, Wisconsin (1887–1889; 1891–1892; 1924–1926)
- Ferdinand B. Smith (fl. 1903–1923), mayor of Norwalk, Connecticut (1903–1904)
- George S. Smith (1907–1986), mayor of Easton, Pennsylvania (1960–1968)
- George Weissinger Smith (1864–1931), mayor of Louisville, Kentucky (1917–1921)
- Gilbert D. Smith (born 1933/1934), mayor of Carson, California (1970–1971; 1974–1975)
- Harri Anne Smith (born 1962), mayor of Slocomb, Alabama (1996–1998)
- Henry P. Smith III (1911–1995), mayor of Tonawanda, New York (1961–1963)
- J. H. Smith (mayor) (1858–1956), mayor of Everett, Washington (1924–1928)
- James A. Smith (mayor), mayor of Ridgefield, Washington
- James Horace Smith (1852–1931), mayor of Orlando, Florida (1904–1906)
- Jimmy Neil Smith (1947–2025), mayor of Jonesborough, Tennessee (1978–1984)
- Joe F. Smith (1918–2013), mayor of Charleston, West Virginia (1980–1983)
- Joe L. Smith (1880–1962), mayor of Beckley, West Virginia
- John Smith (Maine politician) (1874–1936), mayor of Saco, Maine
- John W. Smith (Detroit mayor) (1882–1942), mayor of Detroit, Michigan (1924–1928; 1933)
- Kenneth Smith (mayor), mayor of Bethlehem, Pennsylvania (1988–1997)
- Leon Smith (politician) (born 1937), mayor of Twin Falls, Idaho
- Martin F. Smith (1891–1954), mayor of Hoquiam, Washington (1928–1930)
- Milburn Smith (1912–1994), mayor of Waco, Texas (1976)
- Patricia Spafford Smith (1925–2002), mayor of Shell Lake, Wisconsin
- Robert A. Smith (mayor) (1827–1913), mayor of St. Paul, Minnesota (1887–1892; 1894–1896; 1900–1908)
- Robert B. Smith (Virginia mayor), mayor of Newport News, Virginia (1956–1958)
- S. Rodmond Smith (1841–1912), mayor of Miami, Florida (1911–1913)
- Simon Smith (politician) (1839–1924), mayor of Beloit, Wisconsin (1899–1904)
- Stanley E. Smith Jr. (1919–1973), mayor of Perry, Georgia (1954–1960)
- Steve Smith (Minnesota politician) (1949–2014), mayor of Mound, Minnesota (1987–1990)
- Thomas B. Smith (mayor) (1869–1949), mayor of Philadelphia, Pennsylvania (1916–1920)
- Thomas F. X. Smith (1928–1996), mayor of Jersey City, New Jersey (1977–1981)
- Thomas S. Smith (politician) (1917–2002), mayor of Asbury Park, New Jersey (1989–1993)
- Walter J. Smith (1870–1950), mayor of Eveleth, Minnesota (1908–1910)
- William Ernest Smith (1890–1973), mayor of Murray, Utah (1946–1947)
- William Pruden Smith (1876–1923), mayor of Miami, Florida (1919–1921)

=== 19th century ===
- Smith Ely Jr. (1825–1911), mayor of New York City (1877–1878)
- A. Hyatt Smith (1814–1892), mayor of Janesville, Wisconsin (1853–1854; 1857–1858)
- Addison Gillespie Smith (1851–1933), mayor of Livingston, Alabama
- Albert E. Smith (Wisconsin politician) (born 1839), mayor of Delavan, Wisconsin
- Augustus L. Smith (1833–1902), mayor of Appleton, Wisconsin (1870–1871)
- Charles Brooks Smith (1844–1899), mayor of Parkersburg, West Virginia (1878–1880)
- Charles Sydney Smith (mayor) (1828–1907), mayor of Providence, Rhode Island (1891–1892)
- Cyrus P. Smith (1800–1877), mayor of Brooklyn, New York (1839–1842)
- Daniel C. Smith (1836–1915), mayor of Houston, Texas (1886–1890)
- Edward O. Smith (1817–1892), mayor of Decatur, Illinois
- Elijah F. Smith (1792–1879), mayor of Rochester, New York (1840–1842)
- Ephraim Smith (1819–1891), mayor of Boise, Idaho (1866–1867)
- Fayette Smith (1830–1867), mayor of Dallas, Texas (1861)
- George Baldwin Smith (1823–1879), mayor of Madison, Wisconsin (1858–1861; 1878–1879)
- Henry K. Smith (1811–1854), mayor of Buffalo, New York (1850–1851)
- James Y. Smith (1809–1876), mayor of Providence, Rhode Island (1855–1857)
- Jerome V. C. Smith (1800–1879), mayor of Boston, Massachusetts (1854–1855)
- Jesse N. Smith (1834–1906), mayor of Parowan, Utah (1859–1861)
- John Hugh Smith (1819–1870), mayor of Nashville, Tennessee (1845–1846; 1850–1853; 1862–1865)
- John Montgomery Smith (1834–1903), mayor of Mineral Point, Wisconsin (1879–1882; 1885–1886)
- John Peter Smith (Montana politician) (born 1848), mayor of Missoula, Montana (1885–1887)
- John Peter Smith (Texas politician) (1831–1901), mayor of Fort Worth, Texas (1882–1886; 1890–1892)
- Jonathan J. Smith (1844–1916), mayor of Barron, Wisconsin
- Joseph Smith (1805–1844), mayor of Nauvoo, Illinois (1842–1844)
- Leonard P. Smith (1814–1886), mayor of Seattle, Washington (1880–1882)
- Lindol Smith (born 1832), mayor of Moscow, Idaho
- Marcus C. Smith (1825–1900), mayor of Muncie, Indiana (1869–1877)
- Milo Smith (1807–1869), mayor of Chattanooga, Tennessee (1842–1844; 1850–1852; 1862–1863)
- Samuel Smith (Maryland politician) (1752–1839), mayor of Baltimore, Maryland (1835–1838)
- Samuel Smith (New York politician) (1788–1872), mayor of Brooklyn, New York (1850)
- Thomas Rhett Smith (1768–1829), intendant of Charleston, South Carolina (1813–1815)
- Thomas Slater Smith (1856–1901), mayor of Tupelo, Mississippi
- Thorowgood Smith (1744–1810), mayor of Baltimore, Maryland (1804–1808)
- William Burns Smith (1844–1917), mayor of Philadelphia, Pennsylvania (1884–1887)
- William Russell Smith (1815–1896), mayor of Tuscaloosa, Alabama (1839)
- Smith D. Woods (1830–1888), mayor of Kansas City, Missouri (1874–1875)

== Other ==
- Frederick Smith (South African politician) (1861–1926), mayor of Cape Town, South Africa (1908–1912)
- Grant Smith (politician) (born 1966/1967), mayor of Palmerston North, New Zealand (2015–present)
- Jason Smith (New Zealand politician) (born 1971/1972), mayor of Kaipara, New Zealand (2018–2022)
- John William Smith (politician) (1792–1845), mayor of San Antonio, Republic of Texas (1837–1838; 1840–1841; 1842–1844)
- Nick Smith (New Zealand politician) (born 1964), mayor of Nelson, New Zealand (2022–present)
- Sir Harry Smith, 1st Baronet (1787–1860), mayor of Cambrai, France
- William "Tangier" Smith (1655–1705), mayor of English Tangier (1682–1683)

== See also ==
- Caleb Smith Woodhull, mayor of New York from 1849 to 1851
- Smith (surname)
