= Ed Barker (politician) =

American politician (1935–2025)

Member of the Georgia State Senate from the 18th district
- In office 1973 – January 9, 1991
- Preceded by: Stanley E. Smith Jr.
- Succeeded by: Sonny Perdue

Personal details
- Born: February 21, 1935 Augusta, Georgia, U.S.
- Died: March 23, 2025 (aged 90) Clayton, Georgia, U.S.
- Party: Democratic
- Spouse: Janet Belflower
- Children: 3
- Education: Mercer University

Clarence Edward Barker (February 21, 1935 – March 23, 2025) was an American politician. He served as a Democratic member of the Georgia State Senate for the 18th district from 1973 to 1991.

== Life and career ==
Barker was born in Augusta, Georgia on February 21, 1935. He attended Mercer University.

In 1973, Barker was elected to represent the 18th district of the Georgia State Senate, defeating incumbent Stanley E. Smith Jr. in the August 1972 primary and prevailing over Republican candidate Tony A. Robbins in the general election that November. Barker served until 1991.

Barker died at his home in Clayton, Georgia, on March 23, 2025, at the age of 90.
