= Judge Smith (disambiguation) =

Judge Smith (born 1948) is an English songwriter, author, composer and performer. Judge Smith may also refer to:

== Judges ==
- Arthur Mumford Smith (1903–1968), judge of the United States Court of Customs and Patent Appeals
- Caleb B. Smith (1808–1864), judge of the United States District Court for the District of Indiana
- Charles Lynwood Smith Jr. (born 1943), judge of the United States District Court for the Northern District of Alabama
- Charles P. Smith (judge) (born c. 1879), judge of the United States Board of Tax Appeals, later the United States Tax Court
- D. Brooks Smith (born 1951), judge of the United States Court of Appeals for the Third Circuit
- Edward G. Smith (1961–2023), judge of the United States District Court for the Eastern District of Pennsylvania
- Edward Samuel Smith (1919–2001), judge of the United States Court of Appeals for the Federal Circuit
- Fern M. Smith (born 1933), judge of the United States District Court for the Northern District of California
- George Curtis Smith (1935–2020), judge of the United States District Court for the Southern District of Ohio
- Henry Augustus Middleton Smith (1853–1924), judge of the United States District Court for the District of South Carolina, and of the Eastern and Western Districts of South Carolina
- Howard W. Smith (1883-1976), U.S. Representative from Virginia from 1931 to 1967, frequently known as "Judge Smith"
- J. Joseph Smith (1904–1980), judge of the United States Court of Appeals for the Second Circuit
- James Francis Smith (1859–1928), judge of the United States Court of Customs Appeals
- Janet Smith (judge) (born 1940), British judge of the Court of Appeal
- Jeremiah Smith (lawyer) (1759–1842), judge of the United States Circuit Court for the First Circuit
- Jerry Edwin Smith (born 1946), judge of the United States Court of Appeals for the Fifth Circuit
- John Lewis Smith Jr. (1912–1992), judge of the United States District Court for the District of Columbia
- Lavenski Smith (born 1958), judge of the United States Court of Appeals for the Eighth Circuit
- Loren A. Smith (born 1944), judge of the United States Court of Federal Claims
- Micah W. J. Smith (born 1981), judge of the United States District Court for the District of Hawaii
- Milan Smith (born 1942), judge of the United States Court of Appeals for the Ninth Circuit
- N. Randy Smith (born 1949), judge of the United States Court of Appeals for the Ninth Circuit
- Orma Rinehart Smith (1904–1982), judge of the United States District Court for the Northern District of Mississippi
- Ortrie D. Smith (born 1946), judge of the United States District Court for the Western District of Missouri
- Peter Smith (judge), Sir Peter Winston Smith (born 1952), judge of the High Court of England
- Randle Jasper Smith (1908–1962), judge of the United States District Court for the Western District of Missouri
- Rebecca Beach Smith (born 1949), judge of the United States District Court for the Eastern District of Virginia
- Richard Smith (judge), judge of the High Court of England and Wales
- Rodney Smith (judge) (born 1974), judge of the United States District Court for the Southern District of Florida
- Russell Evans Smith (1908–1990), judge of the United States District Court for the District of Montana
- Sidney Oslin Smith Jr. (1923–2012), judge of the United States District Court for the Northern District of Georgia
- Talbot Smith (1899–1978), judge of the United States District Court for the Eastern District of Michigan
- Thomas J. Smith (judge) (1838–1918), Virginia state court judge before becoming chief justice of the New Mexico Territorial Supreme Court
- Truman Smith (1791–1884), judge of the Court of Arbitration under the treaty of 1862 with Great Britain
- Walter I. Smith (1862–1922), judge of the United States Court of Appeals for the Eighth Circuit
- Walter Scott Smith Jr. (born 1940), judge of the United States District Court for the Western District of Texas
- William Smith (judge, born 1697) (1697–1769), judge of the Province of New York
- William Smith (c. 1762–1840), a judge in South Carolina prior to becoming a U.S. Senator
- William E. Smith (judge) (born 1959), judge of the United States District Court for the District of Rhode Island
- William Francis Smith (1903–1968), judge of the United States Court of Appeals for the Third Circuit
- William Robert Smith (1863–1924), judge of the United States District Court for the Western District of Texas

== See also ==
- Justice Smith (disambiguation)
