= Justice Smyth =

Justice Smyth may refer to:

- Constantine Joseph Smyth (1859–1924), chief justice of the Court of Appeals of the District of Columbia
- Frederick Smyth (New York politician) (1832–1900), judge of the New York Supreme Court
- George W. Smyth (Mississippi judge) (died 1832), justice of the Mississippi Supreme Court

== See also ==
- Sidney Smythe (1705–1778), British judge and politician
- Justice Smith (disambiguation)
