= Lindale =

Lindale may refer to a place:

In the United States

- Lindale, Georgia
- Lindale, Ohio
- Lindale, Texas

Elsewhere

- Lindale, Cumbria, England
  - Lindale and Newton-in-Cartmel, civil parish including Lindale
- Lindale, New Zealand

== See also ==
- Linndale, Ohio
- Lindal-in-Furness, Cumbria, England
- Lindale Park (disambiguation)
- Lindal (disambiguation)
