= Mister Smith =

Mister Smith is a term used for male persons whose surname is Smith.

Mister Smith, Mr Smith, or Mr. Smith can also mean:

== Arts and entertainment ==
=== Fictional characters ===
- Agent Smith, a character in The Matrix, portrayed by Hugo Weaving
- Mr. Smith, a character from Call of the Wild
- Mr Smith (The Sarah Jane Adventures), a fictional extraterrestrial computer in the Doctor Who spinoff The Sarah Jane Adventures

=== Other uses in arts and entertainment ===
- Mr. Smith (album), a hiphop album by rapper LL Cool J
- Mr. Smith (film), a 1976 British short film
- Mr. Smith (novel), a novel by Louis Bromfield
- Mr. Smith (TV series), a short-lived 1983 sitcom, with a talking orangutan as the title character
- Mister Smith Entertainment, a British film company

== People ==
- A placeholder name for a generic person (as Smith is a common English surname) – often exemplified as "John Smith"
- A pen-name used by Ralph Ingersoll Lockwood

== Other uses ==
- SuitSat, a Russian spacesuit nicknamed Mr. Smith by some

== See also ==
- John Doe
- Mr. & Mrs. Smith (disambiguation)
- Mr. Smith Goes to Washington, a popular film starring James Stewart
