= Mr & Mrs =

Mr & Mrs may refer to:

- Mr and Mrs (game show), a United Kingdom television show
- Mr. and Mrs. (2012 film), a film starring Nse Ikpe Etim and Joseph Benjamin
- "Mister and Missus", series 7 episode 8 of Where the Heart Is
- English honorifics, among others including Miss, Ms, Sir, Dr, Lady or Lord
  - Mr., for men
  - Mrs., for women
- Mr & Mrs (1992 film), directed by Sajan
- Mr. & Mrs. a comic strip created 1919 by Clare Briggs for the New York Herald Tribune. The last creator was Kin Platt until 1963.

== See also ==
- All Star Mr & Mrs, a British television show
- Mr. & Mrs. '55, a 1955 Indian romantic comedy film
- Marriage, a union between spouses
- Mr & Miss, a 2021 Indian romantic drama film by T. Ashok Kumar Reddy
- Mr. & Mrs. Smith (disambiguation)
