= POL valve =

Gas connection fitting used on Liquefied petroleum gas 4cylinders

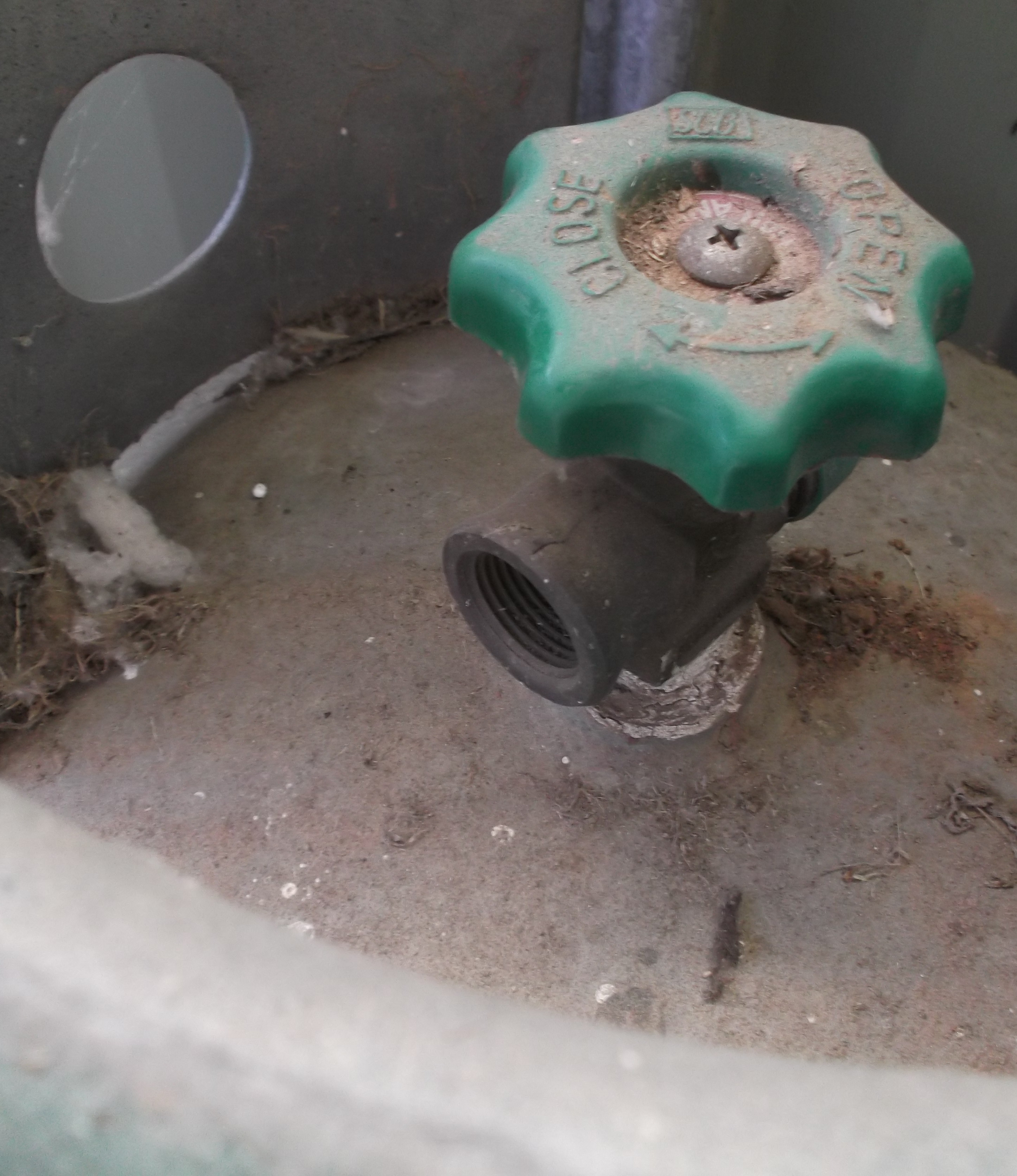
POL valve on a 45 kg LPG cylinder

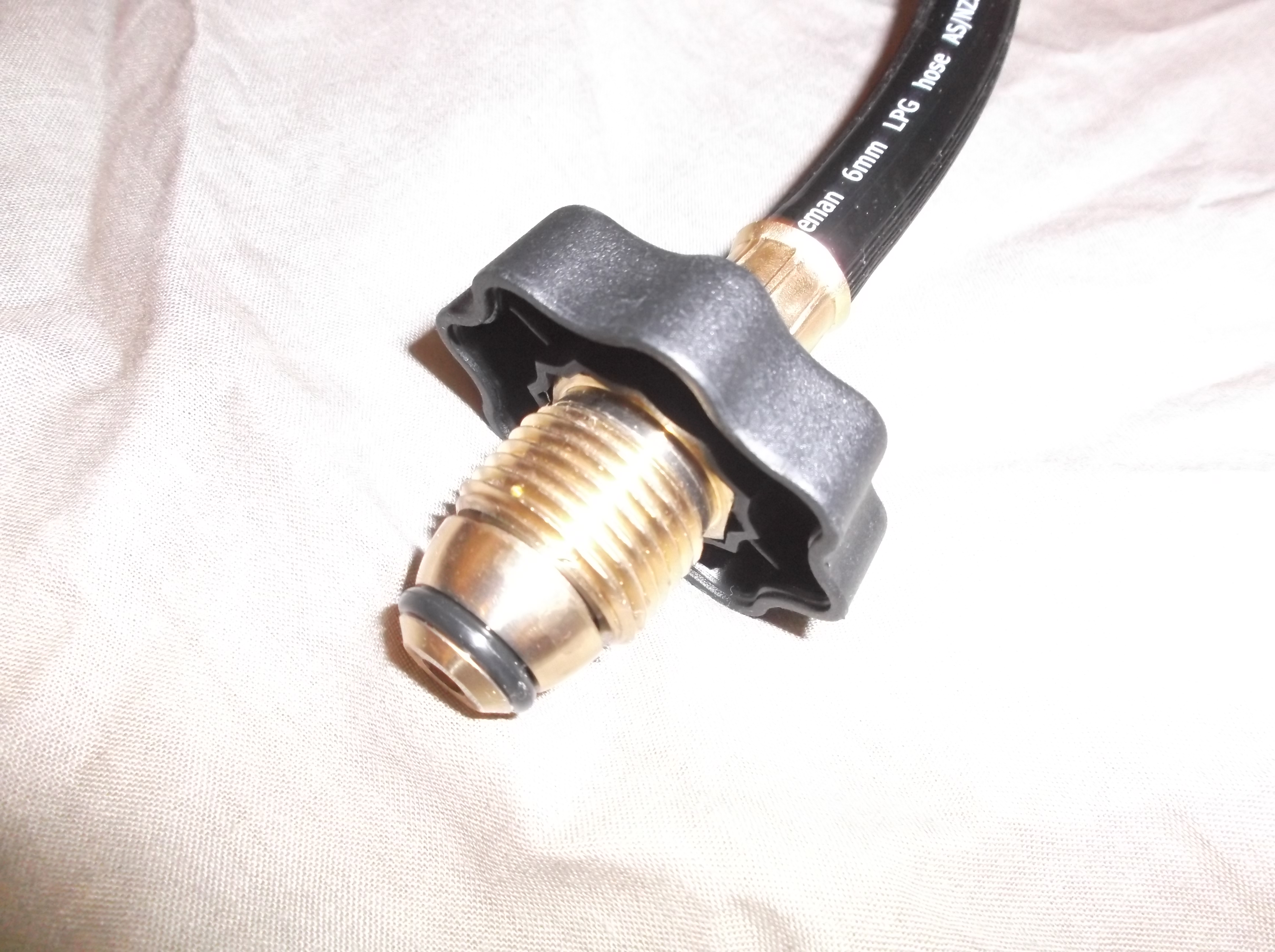
Male fitting to match POL valve

A POL valve (originally for Prest-O-Lite) is a gas connection fitting used on liquefied petroleum gas (LPG) cylinders.

The oldest standard for such connections, it was developed by the Prest-O-Lite company, hence the name. It is still the most common such fitting in some countries such as Australia. All 4.5 kg and 9 kg gas cylinders in Australia used a POL valve until 2021, when they were phased out in favor of the LCC27 valve. There are an estimated 9 million 9 kg cylinders with the Type 21 (POL) valve and cylinder connection in circulation across Australia. In this market, the cylinders mostly supply gas to consumer owned barbecues and patio heaters.

POL valves are legal and quite common in the United States, especially on larger containers, although certain uses (smaller portable containers) require a modified version of the POL valve that includes some safety features.

In making the connection, a male connector is screwed into the Type 21 valve. The first male connectors relied on a metal to metal connection (brass on brass) with sufficient pressure applied via a hexagon nut to achieve an effective seal. The hexagon nut required a spanner to achieve sufficient pressure to obtain a gas tight seal. The notched hexagon nut denotes it is a left-hand thread. Following international convention, the standard changed to allow the use of an integrated hand wheel, with leak tightness being provided by an o-ring or rubber bull nose.

== Thread Type ==
POL is the common name for the standard CGA 510 (US Compressed Gas Association connection number). The Thread specification is .885" – 14 NGO – LH – INT, meaning 0.885 in (22.5 mm) diameter thread, 14 threads per inch (1.814 mm pitch), National Gas Outlet form, left-hand internal thread. This thread is also referred to as "Type 21" as per the Australian standard AS2473.2. In summary, POL, CGA 510 and Type 21 all refer to the same specification.

== See also ==
- Propane, butane, and LPG container valve connections
