= Lindell (surname) =

Lindell is a Swedish surname.

== Geographical distribution ==
As of 2014, 44.8% of all known bearers of the surname Lindell were residents of Sweden (frequency 1:1,779), 38.3% of the United States (1:76,262), 10.1% of Finland (1:4,383), 1.4% of Canada (1:206,730), 1.1% of Denmark (1:41,811) and 1.1% of Australia (1:180,105).

In Sweden, the frequency of the surname was higher than national average (1:1,779) in the following counties:

1. Skåne County (1:998)
2. Blekinge County (1:1,006)
3. Södermanland County (1:1,099)
4. Jönköping County (1:1,117)
5. Östergötland County (1:1,140)
6. Gotland County (1:1,218)
7. Uppsala County (1:1,476)
8. Örebro County (1:1,567)
9. Västmanland County (1:1,572)
10. Kalmar County (1:1,608)
11. Kronoberg County (1:1,664)

In Finland, the frequency of the surname was higher than national average (1:4,383) in the following regions:

1. Ostrobothnia (1:1,337)
2. Central Ostrobothnia (1:1,423)
3. Pirkanmaa (1:2,087)
4. Southwest Finland (1:2,810)
5. Åland (1:3,229)
6. Satakunta (1:3,812)
7. Uusimaa (1:3,893)

== People ==
- Eric Lindell (born 1969), American singer-songwriter
- Esa Lindell (born 1994), Finnish ice hockey player
- Jenny Lindell (born 1953), Australian politician and Speaker of the Victorian Legislative Assembly
- Johnny Lindell (1916–1985), American baseball player
- Ingvar Lindell (1904–1993), Swedish jurist and politician
- Ismo Lindell (born 1939), Finnish electrical engineer and academician
- Mary Lindell (1895–1986), member of the Voluntary Aid Detachment during World War I
- Michael J. Lindell (born 1961), American businessman, political activist, and conspiracy theorist
- Rian Lindell (born 1977), American football player
- Roy Lindell, fictional FBI agent created by Michael Connelly
- Unni Lindell (born 1957), Norwegian writer
- Yehuda Lindell (born 1971), Israeli cryptographer
- Nancy Karetak-Lindell (born 1957), Canadian politician
- Jessica Lindell-Vikarby (born 1984), Swedish Alpine Ski racer
