= Lindale Park =

Lindale Park may refer to:

- Lindale Park, Houston, a neighbourhood in Houston, Texas, United States
- Lindale Park (METRORail station), a METRORail rapid transit station in Houston, Texas, United States
- Lindale Park, Alberta, a locality in Strathcona County, Alberta, Canada
