= Richard Smith (judge) =

English High Court judge

The Honourable Mr Justice Smith

Justice of the High Court
- Incumbent
- Assumed office 2023

Personal details
- Education: Cambridge

Sir Richard Smith, judicially styled Mr Justice Smith, is a High Court judge for England and Wales.

Smith studied law at Manchester University and then in 1994 became a commercial litigation solicitor for Allen & Overy. He undertook postgraduate study at the University of Cambridge in 2018. During his studies, Smith also worked as an arbitrator. He was appointed as a Recorder for criminal matters in 2018. He was appointed a Deputy High Court Judge in 2019 for the Chancery and King's Bench divisions. He was appointed to the High Court in February 2023 and assigned to the Chancery Division of the High Court.
