= Lyndall Fraker =

American politician

Member of the Missouri House of Representatives from the 137th district
- In office 2011–2019
- Succeeded by: John Black

Personal details
- Born: August 9, 1959 (age 66) Springfield, Missouri
- Party: Republican
- Spouse: Melanie
- Children: three
- Profession: Building Contractor/Real Estate Developer

Lyndall Fraker (born August 9, 1959) is an American politician. He was a member of the Missouri House of Representatives, having served from 2011 to 2019. He is a member of the Republican party.
