= President Smith =

President Smith may refer to:

- Anthony Smith (American politician), Republican president of the West Virginia Senate
- George Albert Smith (1870–1951), president of the LDS Church
- James Skivring Smith (1825–1892), 6th president of Liberia
- Joseph F. Smith (1838–1918), president of the LDS Church
- Joseph Fielding Smith (1876–1972), president of the LDS Church
- John Augustine Smith (1782–1865), president of the College of William and Mary
- W. Wallace Smith (1900–1989), president of the LDS Church and son of Joseph F. Smith
