= Lindahl =

Lindahl is a Swedish surname. Notable people with the surname include:

- Anna Lindahl (1904–1952), Swedish film actress
- Axel Lindahl (photographer) (1841–1906), Swedish photographer
- Axel Lindahl (athlete) (born 1995), Swedish footballer
- Axel Lindahl (footballer) (1841–1906), Swedish photographer
- Bruce Lindahl (1919–2014), American politician
- Bruce Lindahl (criminal) (1953–1981), American serial killer
- Carl-Erhard Lindahl (born 1935), Swedish diplomat
- Cathrine Lindahl (born 1970), Swedish curler
- Erik Lindahl (1891–1960), Swedish economist
- Fredrik Lindahl (handballer) (born 1983), Swedish handball player
- Fredrik Lindahl (politician) (born 1987), Swedish politician
- Hans Lindahl (born 1954), Swedish comic book artist
- Hedvig Lindahl (born 1983), Swedish football (soccer) goalkeeper
- John Lindahl (born 1996), American singer & songwriter
- Josua Lindahl (1844–1914), Swedish scientist
- Karl Lindahl (1890–1960), Swedish gymnast who competed in the 1920 Summer Olympics
- Karl Lindahl (architect) (1874–1930), Finnish architect of Swedish origin
- Lisa Lindahl (born 1948), American inventor
- Margaretha Lindahl (born 1974), Swedish curler, world champion and Olympic medalist
- Marita Lindahl (1938–2017), Finnish model and 1957 Miss World beauty pageant winner
- Nick Lindahl (born 1988), Australian tennis player
- Peter Lindahl (1712–1792), Swedish stage actor and theatre director
- Sven Lindahl (1937–2025), Swedish journalist, songwriter, and radio and television presenter
- Tomas Lindahl (born 1938), Swedish scientist and winner of the Nobel Prize and the Royal Medal

== See also ==
- Lindahl equilibrium, Taxation principal named after Erik Lindahl
