= Lindell =

Lindell may refer to:

- Lindell (surname)
- Lindell, Missouri, U.S.
- Lindell, Virginia, U.S.

== People with the given name ==
- Lindell Holmes, American boxer
- Lin Houston, former American football player
- Lindell Nurse, Barbadian politician
- Lindell Shumake, American politician
- Lindell Wigginton (born 1998), Canadian basketball player in the Israeli Premier League
