= Stanley E. Smith Jr. =

American politician

Member of the Georgia State Senate from the 18th district
- In office 1962–1973
- Preceded by: District created
- Succeeded by: Ed Barker

Mayor of Perry
- In office 1954–1960
- Preceded by: Mayo Davis
- Succeeded by: Milton Beckham

Personal details
- Born: September 7, 1919 Liberty, Missouri
- Died: August 9, 1973 (aged 53) Warner Robins, Georgia
- Party: Democratic
- Spouse: Carolyn Coleman Smith (m. 1943)
- Children: Lynn; Susan
- Education: William Jewell College; Wagner College; Brooklyn Law School
- Occupation: Politician
- Military career
- Allegiance: United States
- Service: United States Army Air Corps
- Service years: 1941–1945
- Rank: Major
- Conflict: World War II

Stanley Eugene Smith Jr. (September 7, 1919 – August 9, 1973) was an American Democratic politician who was mayor of Perry, Georgia from 1954 to 1960, and served in the Georgia State Senate for the 18th district until 1973.

Smith was born on September 7, 1919 in Liberty, Missouri to Stanley E. Smith, a Baptist minister. Smith graduated from William Jewell College, and later attended Wagner College and Brooklyn Law School. In 1941, Smith enlisted in the United States Army and was transferred to the Warner Robins Air Logistics Complex; he retired from the United States Army Air Corps in October 1945 with the rank of major.

Smith was elected as the mayor of Perry, Georgia in 1954, replacing Mayo Davis. Smith served three two-year terms and was succeeded by Milton Beckham in 1960. Smith then served in the Georgia State Senate from 1962 to 1973, representing the newly created 18th district. He defeated William J. Wilson in the 1962 election. Smith was unseated in the primary by Ed Barker in 1972.

In 1943, Smith married Carolyn Coleman, a history teacher at Perry High School. They had two daughters, Lynn and Susan.

Smith died on August 9, 1973, at Houston County Hospital.
