= Justice Smith (disambiguation) =

Justice Smith (born 1995) is an American actor.

Justice Smith may also refer to:

- Abram D. Smith (1811–1865), associate justice of the Wisconsin Supreme Court
- Carsten Smith (born 1932), chief justice of the Supreme Court of Norway
- Charles Z. Smith (1927–2016), associate justice of the Washington Supreme Court
- Clark Allen Smith (1846–1921), associate justice of the Kansas Supreme Court
- Clyde E. Smith (1897–1971), justice of the Texas Supreme Court
- Cotesworth P. Smith (1807–1862), associate justice and chief justice of the Supreme Court of Mississippi
- Elbert B. Smith (1921–2013), associate justice of the Idaho Supreme Court
- Ellison G. Smith (1854–1935), associate justice of the South Dakota Supreme Court
- Frank G. Smith (1872–1950), associate justice of the Arkansas Supreme Court
- George Bundy Smith (1937–2017), justice of the New York Court of Appeals
- George Rose Smith (1911–1992), associate justice of the Arkansas Supreme Court
- George T. Smith (1916–2010), associate justice of the Supreme Court of Georgia
- George W. Smith (judge) (1820s–1873), associate justice of the Texas Supreme Court
- Griffin Smith (1885–1955), associate justice of the Arkansas Supreme Court
- Harvey W. Smith (1857–1895), associate justice of the Utah Supreme Court
- Henry C. Smith (judge) (1862–1932), justice of the Montana Supreme Court
- Henry G. Smith (1807–1878), associate justice of the Tennessee Supreme Court
- Isaac Smith (New Jersey politician) (1740–1807), associate justice of the Supreme Court of New Jersey
- Isaac W. Smith (New Hampshire politician) (1825–1898), associate justice of the New Hampshire Supreme Court
- Israel Smith (1759–1810), chief justice of the Vermont Supreme Court
- James Francis Smith (1859–1928), associate Justice of the Supreme Court of the Philippines
- James W. Smith Jr. (born 1943), Chief of the Supreme Court of Mississippi
- Janet Smith (judge) (born 1940), Lord Justice of Appeal of the Court of Appeal of England and Wales
- Jeremiah Smith (lawyer) (1759–1842), chief justice of the Supreme Judicial Court of New Hampshire
- June C. Smith (1876–1947), chief justice of the Supreme Court of Illinois
- Lavenski Smith (born 1958), associate justice of the Arkansas Supreme Court
- Lemuel F. Smith (1890–1956), justice of the Supreme Court of Appeals of Virginia
- Lemuel Augustus Smith (1878–1950), associate justice of the Supreme Court of Mississippi
- Lemuel Augustus Smith Jr. (1904–2001), associate justice of the Supreme Court of Mississippi
- Marvin H. Smith (1916–2010), associate justice of the Maryland Court of Appeals
- Milford K. Smith (1906–1984), associate justice of the Vermont Supreme Court
- Nathaniel Smith (1762–1822), associate justice of the Connecticut Supreme Court
- Noah Smith (judge) (1756–1812), associate justice of the Vermont Supreme Court
- Otis M. Smith (1922–1994), first African American justice of the Michigan Supreme Court
- Patricia M. Smith (born c. 1953), associate justice of the Alabama Supreme Court
- Robert Smith (Canadian judge) (1858–1942), puisne justice of the Supreme Court of Canada
- Robert L. Smith (judge) (1918–1999), associate justice of the Nebraska Supreme Court
- Robert S. Smith (born 1944), associate judge of the New York Court of Appeals
- Seward Smith (1830–1887), associate justice of the Dakota Territory Supreme Court
- St. Clair Smith (1889–1988), associate justice of the South Dakota Supreme Court
- Steven Wayne Smith (born 1961), justice of the Texas Supreme Court
- Sydney M. Smith (1869–1948), associate justice and chief justice of the Supreme Court of Mississippi
- Theophilus W. Smith (1784–1845), associate justice of the Illinois Supreme Court
- Thomas Smith (Pennsylvania judge) (1745–1809), associate justice of the Supreme Court of Pennsylvania
- Thomas Smith (Indiana judge) (born 1805; fl. 1840s–1850s), associate justice of the Supreme Court of Indiana
- Thomas J. Smith (judge) (1838–1918), chief justice of the New Mexico Territorial Supreme Court
- William Smith (judge, born 1728) (1728–1793), chief justice of the Province of Quebec
- William A. Smith (Iowa judge) (1870–1958), associate justice of the Iowa Supreme Court
- William A. Smith (Kansas judge) (1888–1968), associate justice of the Kansas Supreme Court
- William J. Smith (Arkansas judge) (c. 1909–2000), associate justice of the Arkansas Supreme Court
- Sir William James Smith (1853–1912), British judge who served as the chief justice of the Supreme Court of Cyprus, British Guiana and the Transvaal
- William N. H. Smith (1812–1889), chief justice of the North Carolina Supreme Court
- William Redwood Smith (1851–1935), associate justice of the Kansas Supreme Court
- William W. Smith (Arkansas judge) (1838–1888), associate justice of the Arkansas Supreme Court

== See also ==
- Smith Thompson, associate justice of the United States Supreme Court
- Judge Smith (disambiguation)
- Justice Smyth (disambiguation)
