= Lyndale =

Lyndale can refer to any of several places and things:

- Lyndale, Minneapolis, a neighborhood in Minneapolis, Minnesota, USA
  - Lyndale Park, a park in Minneapolis
  - Lyndale Avenue, a major thoroughfare in Minneapolis
- Lyndale Railway, a defunct Minnesota rail company
- Lyndale, Ontario, a community in Ontario, Canada
- Lyndale Secondary College, in Melbourne, Australia
- Lyndale AFC, a former New Zealand association football team, now merged as part of Lynn-Avon United
