= Mr. & Mrs. Smith =

Mr. & Mrs. Smith may refer to:

== Film and television ==
- Mr. & Mrs. Smith (1941 film), an American comedy directed by Alfred Hitchcock
- Mr. & Mrs. Smith (1996 TV series), a short-lived American crime drama series airing on the CBS network in 1996
- Mr. & Mrs. Smith (2005 film), an American action-comedy film starring Brad Pitt and Angelina Jolie
- Mr. & Mrs. Smith (2024 TV series), a television series inspired by the 2005 film

== Music ==
- "Mr. & Mrs. Smith" (song), a 2012 song in the musical TV series Smash
- "Mr and Mrs Smith", a song by Stereophonics on the 2015 album Keep the Village Alive

== Hotels ==
- Mr & Mrs Smith (brand), a chain of international luxury and boutique hotels owned by Hyatt

== See also ==
- Mr and Mrs Smith and Mr Drake, a 1984 album by Cardiacs
- Mr & Mrs (disambiguation)
