= Lindol Smith =

American politician in Idaho

Lindol Smith (born June 6, 1832) was an American mayor and state legislator in Idaho. He served two terms as mayor of Moscow, Idaho.

Smith was born in New Philadelphia, Ohio in Tuscarawas County. He became a carpenter and served in the American Civil War. His wife and several other family members were killed by scarlet fever. The financial panic of 1873 cost him financially. He built a planing mill in Moscow around 1882. He was a Department Commander for the Grand Army of the Republic in 1897. He served as a councilman, mayor, and was elected to the state legislature in 1898. He represented Latah County in the Idaho House of Representatives.

Captain Edward Smith was one of his sons.
