= EN 417 =

Gas cartridge for use in camping stoves

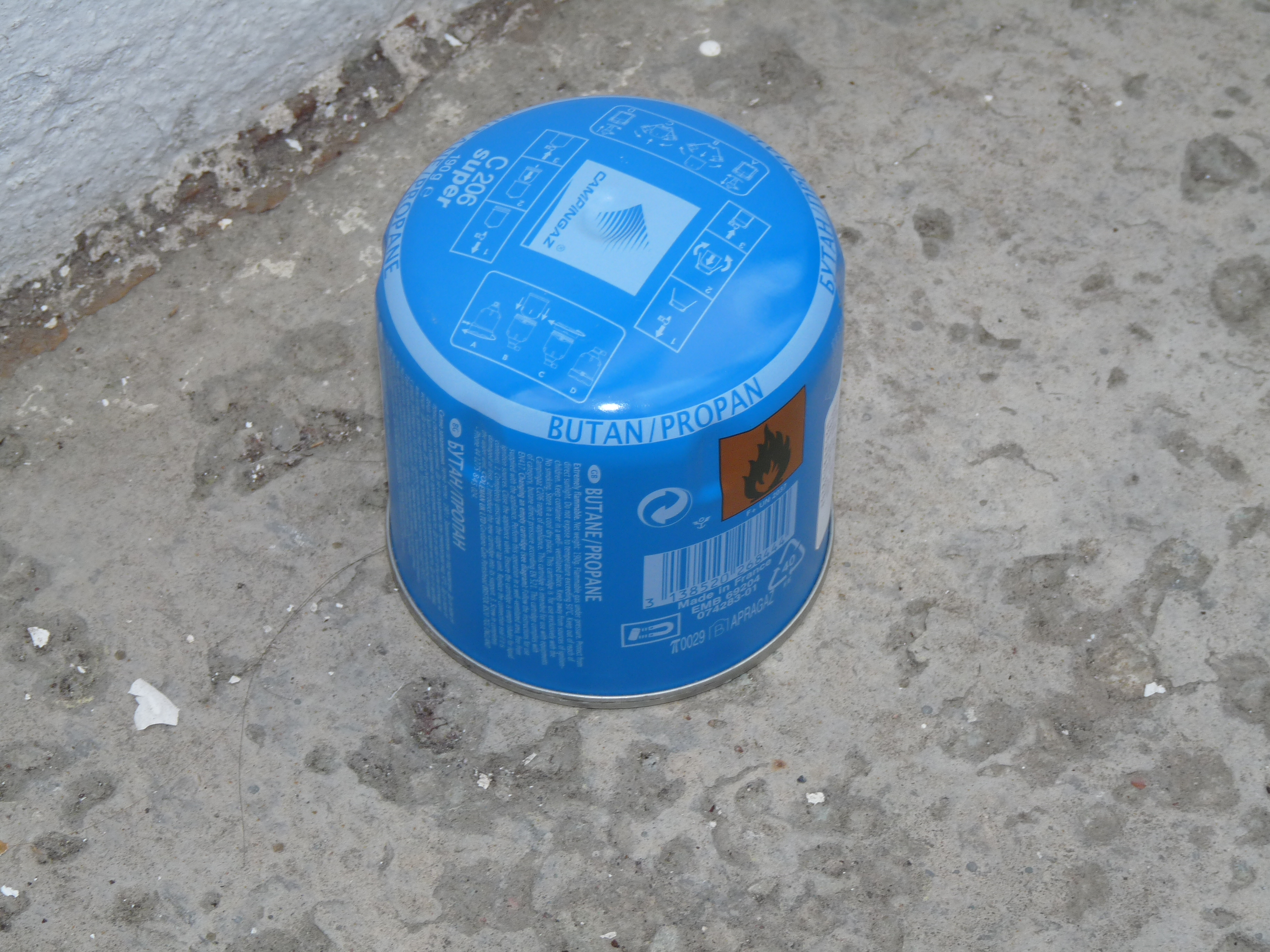
Pierceable gas cylinder

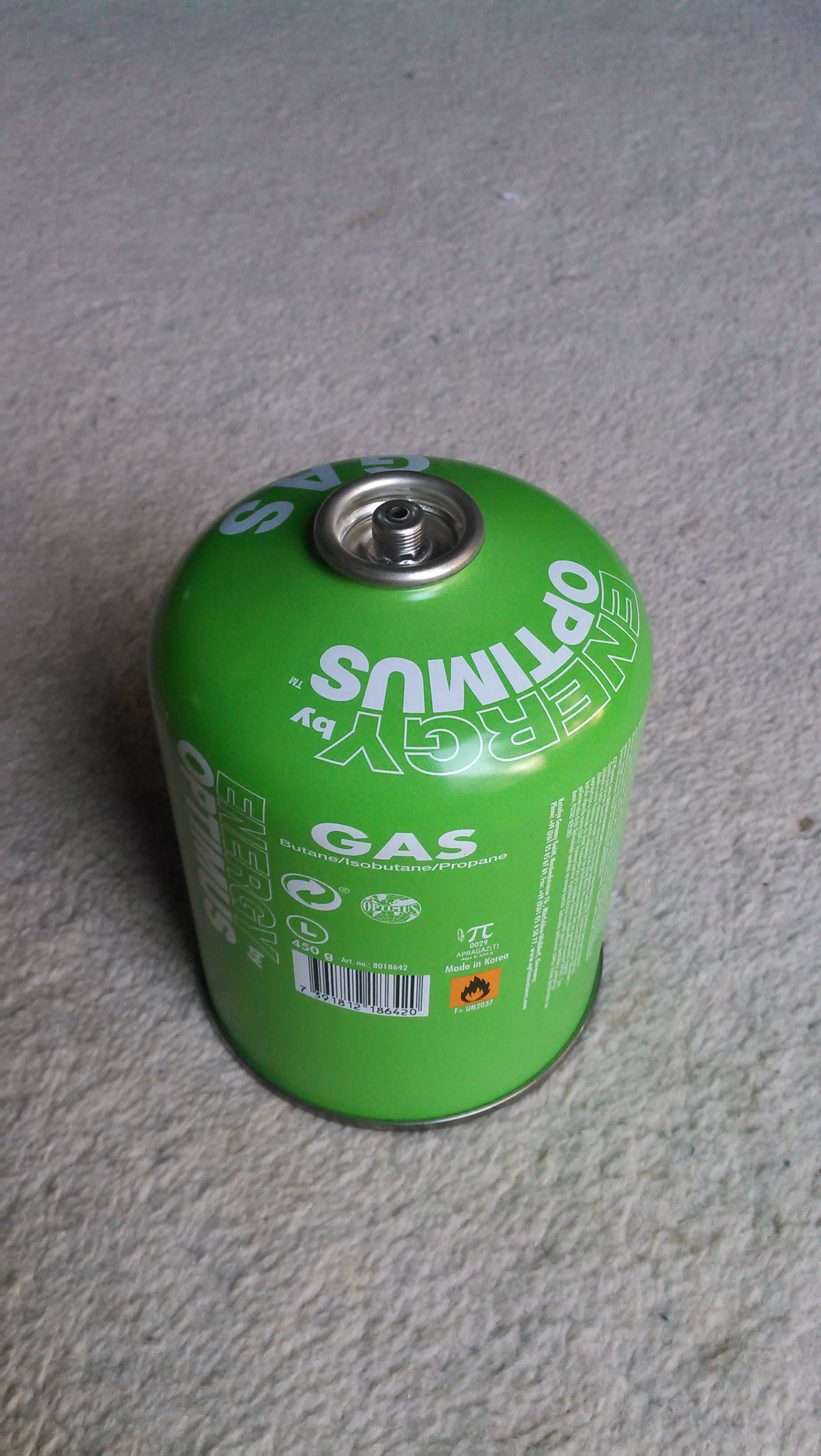
Gas cylinder with Lindal B188 valve.

EN 417 is a European Standard concerning non-refillable metallic cartridges for liquefied petroleum gases. The standard specifies material, construction, inspection and marking requirements for cartridges with or without a valve, for use with portable appliances which comply with the requirements of EN 521.

The term is used colloquially to refer to cartridges with the 7/16" UNEF threaded valve used on disposable butane and butane/isobutane/propane mix cartridges used in some backpacking stoves. The correct name for this is Lindal B188 valve, the manufacturer's designation. This informal use is improper, as the EN 417 standard applies also to cartridges that do not have a Lindal valve, such as the valveless, pierceable Epigas canisters often used in Europe.

Unlike a pierceable, disposable canister, a Lindal valve should seal itself if the fuel container is unscrewed from the equipment to which it is attached. However, the self-sealing action cannot be relied upon as a safety feature. A dirty valve can leak, and the thread can be damaged by external force.

Among suppliers of gas cylinders and camp stoves are Epigas (Coleman), Sievert, GoSystem, Primus, Brunton, Jetboil, Mountain Safety Research, Snow Peak, Trangia, Rothenberger, and Campingaz.
