= List of defunct hotel chains =

This is a list of defunct hotel chains. This list also includes defunct motel chains.

== Defunct hotel chains ==
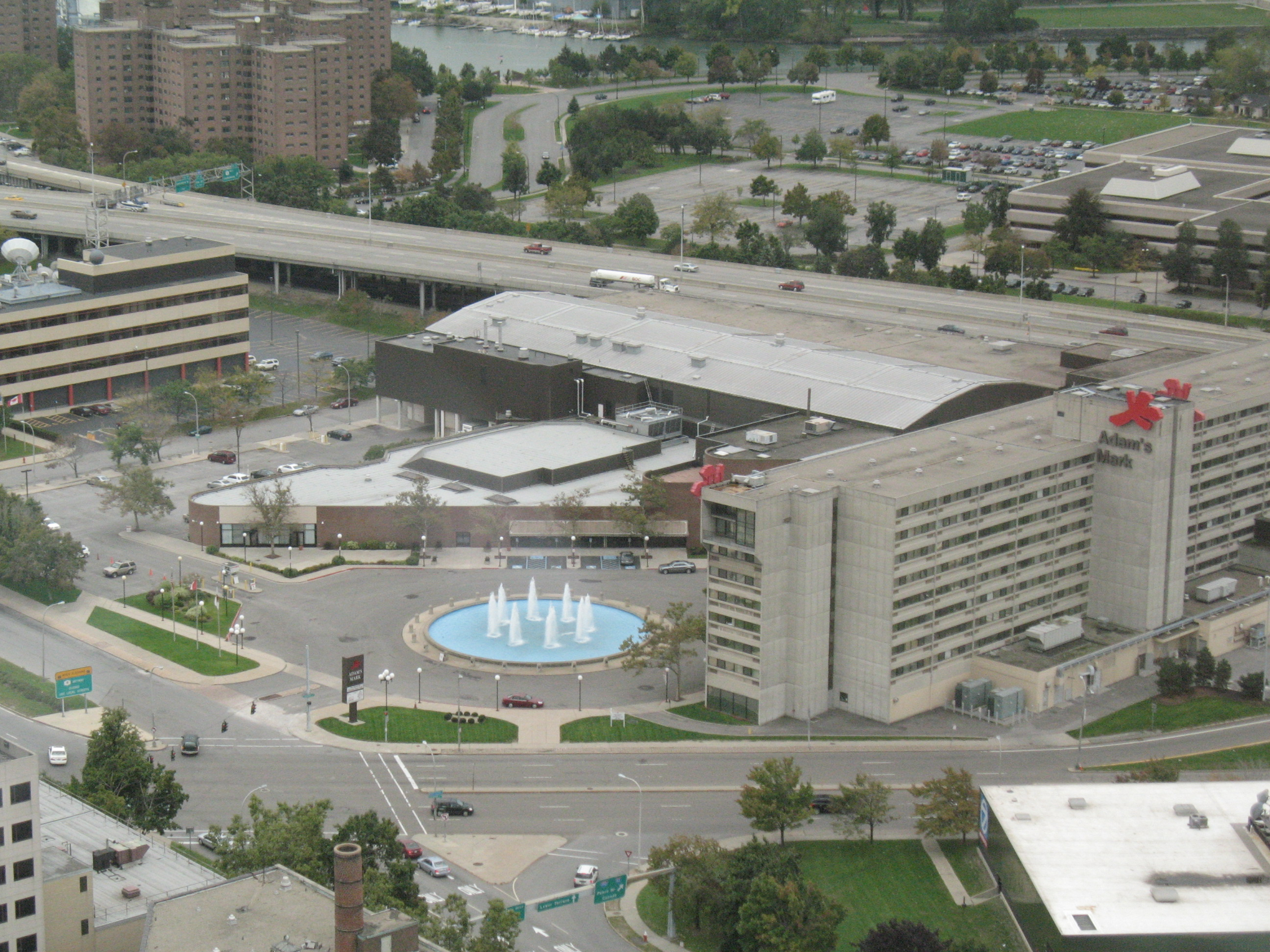
The final Adam's Mark Hotel, in Buffalo, New York

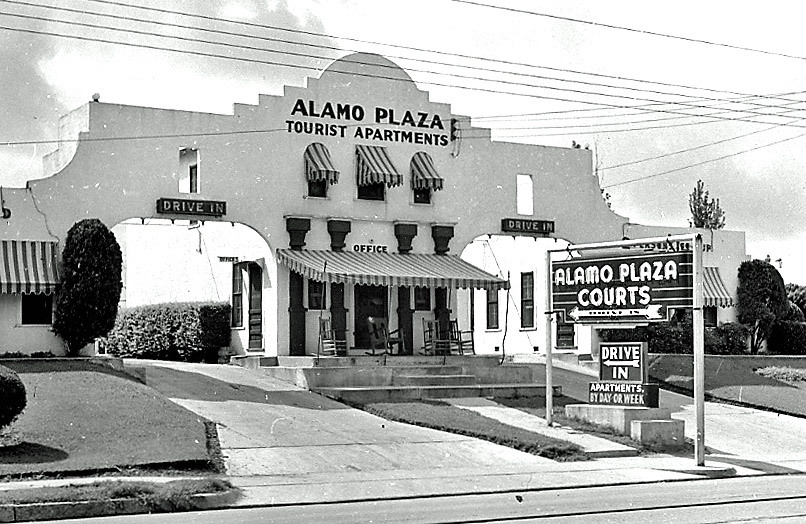
A former Alamo Plaza Hotel Courts location in Waco, Texas

- Adam's Mark
- Admiral Benbow Inn
- Alamo Plaza Hotel Courts
- Albert Pick
- Allegro Resorts Corporation
- AmeriSuites
- Capital Bars
- Crest Hotels
- Cross Country Inn – defunct American motel chain
- Denizen Hotels – defunct brand of Hilton Hotels
- Esso Motor Hotel
- Exel Inn
- Forte Group
- Four Pillars Hotels
- Fred Harvey Company
- Friendship Inn
- Gran Dorado
- Great Southern Hotels
- Hiway House – defunct American motel chain
- Homestead Studio Suites Hotels
- Horne's
- The Hotel Collection
- Imperial 400 – defunct American motel chain
- Jack Tar Hotels
- Jurys Inn
- Lees Inn
- Morgans Hotel Group
- Nickelodeon Resorts by Marriott
- Norsk Spisevognselskap
- Parliament House Motor Inn
- Patio Hotels
- Promus Hotel Corporation
- Ramada Jarvis
- The Real Hotel Company
- Rica Hotels – purchased by Scandic Hotels in 2014
- Royal Inns of America
- Shoney's Inn – defunct American motel chain
- Stakis Hotels
- Starwood
- Statler Hotels
- Summerfield Suites
- Susse Chalet
- Swallow Hotels
- Tage Inn
- Temple Hotels
- Trust Houses Ltd
- Trusthouse Forte
- United Hotels Company of America
- Van Noy Railway News and Hotel Company
- Vantage Hospitality
- Wilson World Hotels

== See also ==
- List of chained-brand hotels
- List of hotels in the United States
- List of largest hotels in the world
- Lists of hotels – an index of hotel list articles on Wikipedia
