= Royal Inns of America =

Defunct American hotel chain

- Industry: Hotels
- Founded: 1965
- Defunct: 1975
- Headquarters: San Diego, California, U.S.
- Area served: United States
- Key people: Earl Gagosian

Royal Inns of America was a chain of hotels in the United States, headquartered in San Diego. The company was founded in 1965 by Earl Gagosian.

== Company timeline ==
- 1965 - "Royal Inns of America" founded
- 1971 - Operating 56 hotels
- 1975 - Files for bankruptcy

== Locations ==
=== Palm Springs, California ===
First Royal Inn - opened late 1965.

=== Santa Monica, California ===
First high-rise Royal Inn.

=== Chula Vista, California ===
Opened 1971.

=== Anaheim, California ===
Opened October 16, 1971, the Royal Inn of Anaheim had 500 rooms, and two restaurants - Earl’s Seafood Grotto and Cocktail Lounge and Jolly King Family Restaurant. Following the collapse of the company itself, Royal Inns sold the hotel in August 1976 to hotelier Jack Wrather, where it was re-named "The Inn At The Park". It then underwent numerous changes of ownership, and is currently the Sheraton Park Hotel.

=== West Des Moines, Iowa ===
Called Royal Inn of Des Moines. Located at 3530 Westown Parkway. The building is still there, but the pool has been filled in with rocks. Currently operating as an extended stay apartment complex.

=== Paradise, Las Vegas ===
Demolished February 10, 2015.

=== Lake Buena Vista, Florida ===
Located within Walt Disney World in Florida; now the B Resort & Spa Lake Buena Vista.

=== Tijuana, Mexico ===
Opened on January 20, 1973. After Royal Inn's bankruptcy, the hotel was sold to Ramada and changed its name to Ramada Inn. The property has changed owners multiple times over the years. Since 2007, the hotel has been the Marriott Tijuana.

== See also ==
- List of defunct hotel chains
