= Patio (disambiguation) =

A patio is an outdoor space adjoining a residence, generally used for dining or recreation.

Patio can also refer to:

== Places ==
- Patio (Taha'a), village in French Polynesia
- Patio Island, an island of Papua New Guinea

== Other uses ==
- Patio (album), a 1993 album by Gorky's Zygotic Mynci
- El Patio, a 1975 album by Triana
- Patio (soda), a brand of diet soda in the 1960s and 1970s
- Patio Theater, a former movie palace in Chicago
- Patio Hotels, a former British hotel chain
- Operation Patio, a covert U.S. military action during the Vietnam War

== See also ==
- Patio process, metallurgical process
- Los Patios, town in Colombia
