= Beacon Grand Hotel =

Hotel in San Francisco, California

Coordinates: 37.789126°N 122.408356°W

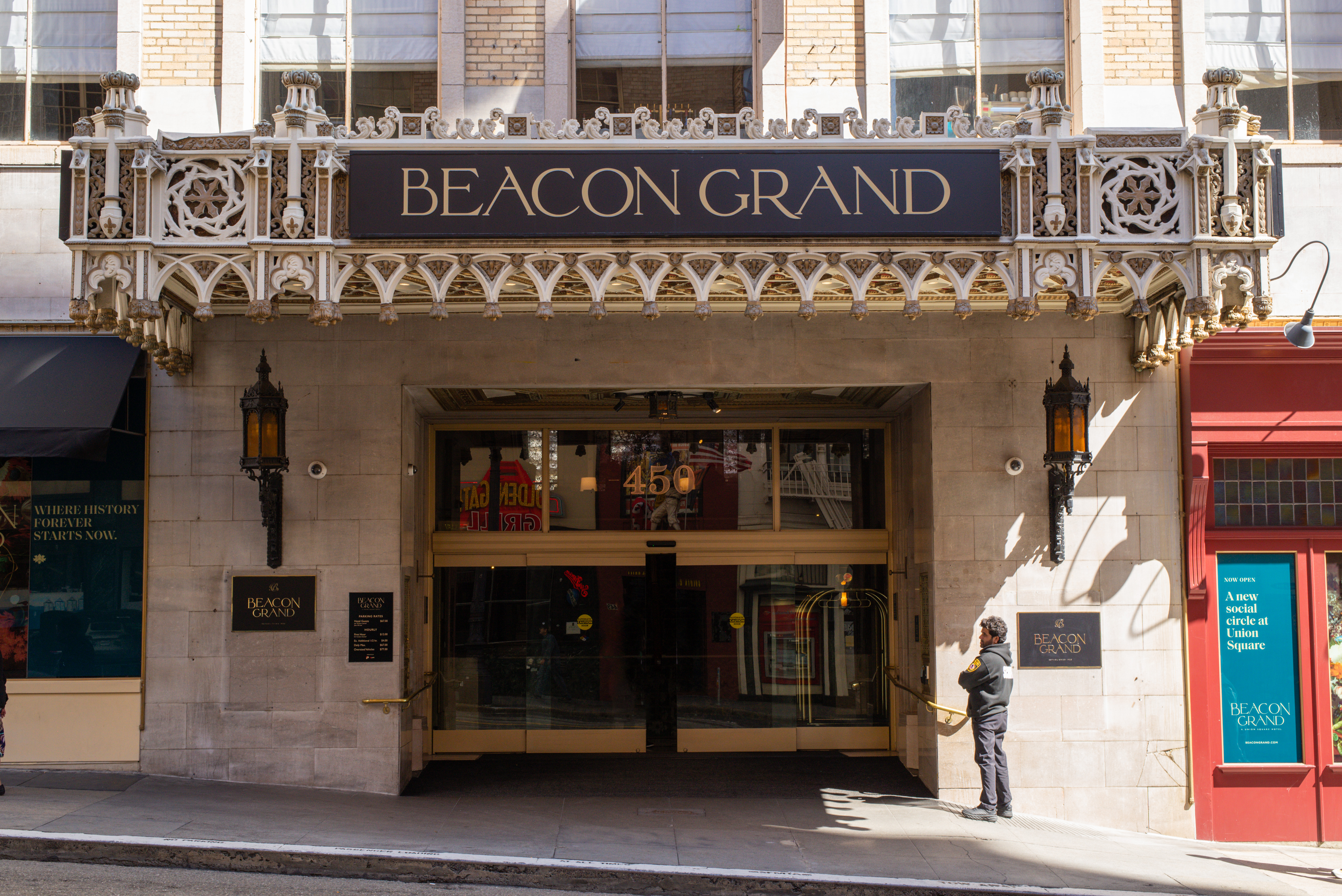
Main entrance to the Beacon Grand Hotel

The Beacon Grand is a historic 416-room hotel in San Francisco, California, opened in 1928 as the Sir Francis Drake Hotel. It is located at the corner of Sutter and Powell streets adjacent to Union Square.

== History ==
The Sir Francis Drake Hotel was named after the English explorer who, in 1579, narrowly missed discovering San Francisco Bay and instead sailed the Golden Hind into Drakes Bay, 28 miles (45 km) north. Built by Midwestern hotel developers Leon W. Huckins and John A. Newcomb at a cost of $5 million (equivalent to $93.8 million in 2025), the hotel's grand opening, on October 23, 1928, attracted a crowd of 10,000 people during a two-day open house, as well as officials like San Francisco Mayor Jimmy Rolph, Jr. and California Governor, C. C. Young. Orchestras played and banquets were held to celebrate what headlines at the time described as “The last word in hotels” for innovations and amenities such as an indoor golf course, ice water on tap, and radios in every guest room. Another feature was the Servidor, a panel in the guest room doors which allowed staff to deliver dry cleaning and other items without disturbing guests.

After the stock market crash in 1929, the hotel still prospered, attracting Hollywood luminaries like Dolores del Río, Myrna Loy, Barbara Stanwyck and the “Our Gang” child actors, as well as dance troupes and vaudeville players. Prohibition was repealed in 1933 and in 1936, the hotel opened a supper club on the street level that became a popular San Francisco nightspot featuring dancing, dramatic lighting and murals painted by A.B. Heinsbergen. Legendary San Francisco columnist Herb Caen dubbed the Persian Room “The Snake Pit” because, he said, “You never heard such hissing or saw such writhing."

The Sir Francis Drake was sold to Conrad Hilton in 1938. It was his first hotel outside of Texas. Hilton sold the hotel to industrialist E. B. DeGolia on December 8, 1941, the day after Pearl Harbor was bombed, and Western Hotels (later Western International, today Westin) assumed management of the property. During World War II, blocks of rooms were taken over by the U.S. military and the hotel was the scene of many tearful farewells and joyous reunions as troops made their way to and from the Pacific. During the war and in the post-war era, the Sir Francis Drake Hotel become synonymous with San Francisco nightlife thanks to the popularity of the Persian Room and Starlight Room (known then as the Starlite Roof), the 21st floor nightclub that featured dining, dancing and orchestras.

In 1965, Bewitched star Paul Lynde and James "Bing" Davidson, a 24-year-old actor, checked into the hotel together. After a few hours of drinking tragedy struck when Davidson accidentally fell to his death from the window of room 822.

Princess Hotels International bought the Sir Francis Drake in 1970 and assumed management from Western International on December 1, 1970. As the hotel approached its 50th anniversary, an extensive $5 million restoration was undertaken – equal to the cost of the original construction. It was begun in 1971 and included uncovering and restoring lobby paintings depicting Drake's explorations and original ironwork and chandeliers that had been covered in several layers of paint. Completed in 1974, the project also revealed and restored the grand marble staircase and reduced the number of rooms from 600 to 386. During this time, famed doorman and local personality Tom Sweeney assumed his post at the Drake's entrance in the hotel's trademark red Beefeater uniform. His photograph was reportedly taken hundreds of times per day prior to his 2020 retirement.

In the late 1980s, the hotel ran into financial difficulties. Kimpton Hotels & Restaurants founder Bill Kimpton saved the iconic hotel in 1993 by forming an investment partnership that purchased the property for $22 million (equivalent to $49 million in 2025). Another $9 million was invested to renovate the entire building inside and out and the hotel was renamed the Kimpton Sir Francis Drake Hotel. In 2005, Kimpton Hotels sold the hotel to a group of international investors known as SFD Partners, LLC, though Kimpton continued to manage the property. SFD's successor, the Chartres Lodging Group, sold the hotel in 2010 to Pebblebrook Hotel Trust for $90 million (equivalent to $132.9 million in 2025).

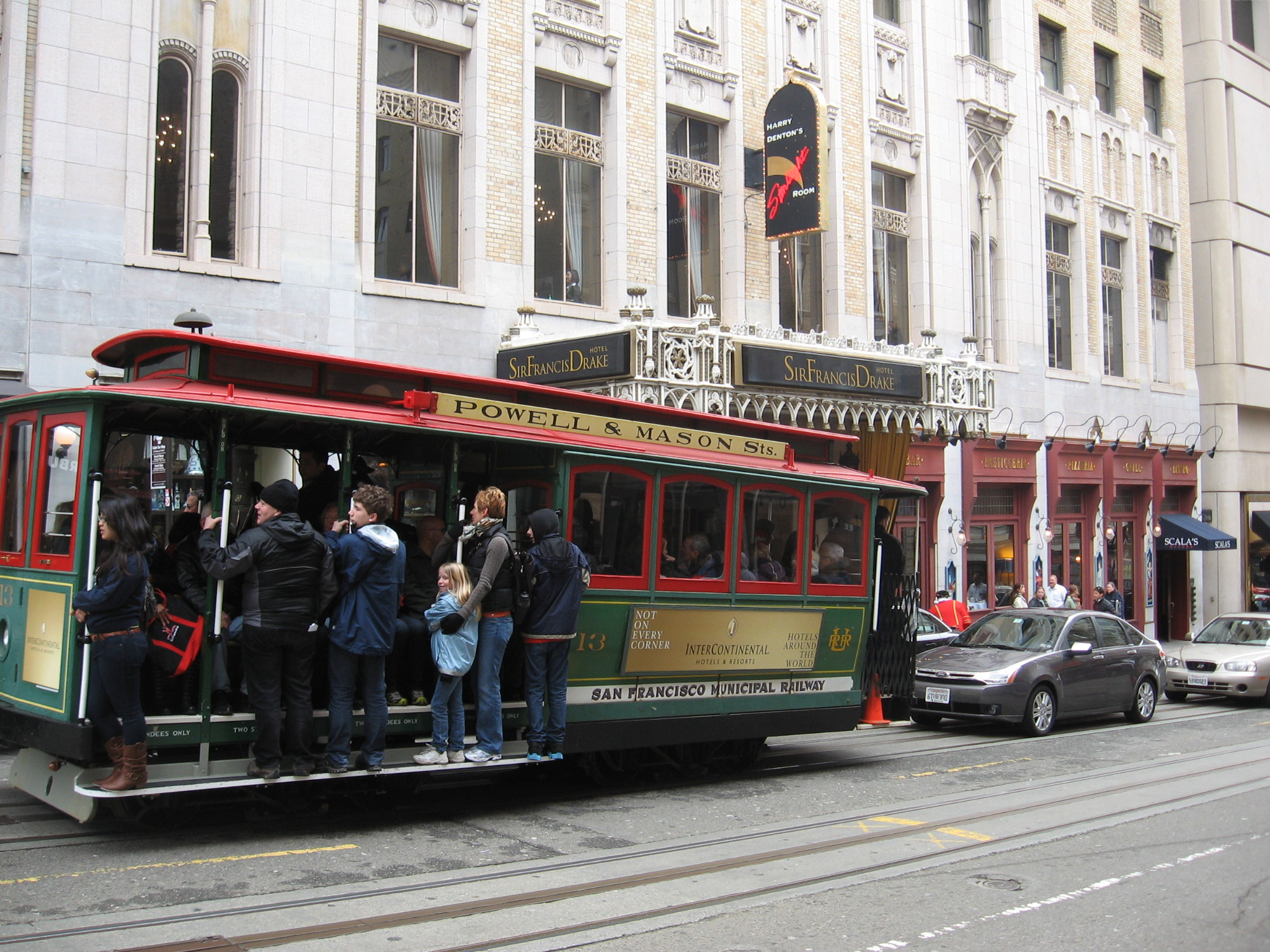
Sir Francis Drake Hotel entrance in 2012

The hotel closed temporarily in March 2020, due to the economic impact of the COVID-19 pandemic. In July 2020, Kimpton announced that it was considering renaming the hotel, due to Sir Francis Drake's involvement in the slave trade. Pebblebrook announced in February 2021 that they would sell the hotel for $157.6 million to the Connecticut-based Northview Hotel Group. The sale closed on April 1, 2021, and the still-shuttered hotel ceased to be managed by Kimpton Hotels as of that day.

On February 19, 2022, it was announced that the hotel would be renamed the Beacon Grand. It reopened on June 30, 2022.

== Location ==
The Beacon Grand is located in downtown Union Square, San Francisco. The hotel is adjacent to Saks Fifth Avenue's San Francisco flagship store and the iconic Powell–Mason cable car line passes in front of the hotel. The hotel is also adjacent to the Theatre District and Chinatown, the oldest in North America.

== Architecture ==
Hotel developers Huckins and Newcomb set out to make the Sir Francis Drake a hotel to impress. Even with exceptional amenities like an indoor golf course, it was ultimately the extravagant interiors that made the hotel famous. Designed to reflect the European Renaissance of Drake's era, architectural elements included the grand marble staircase, vaulted gold leafed embossed ceilings and bas-relief detail.

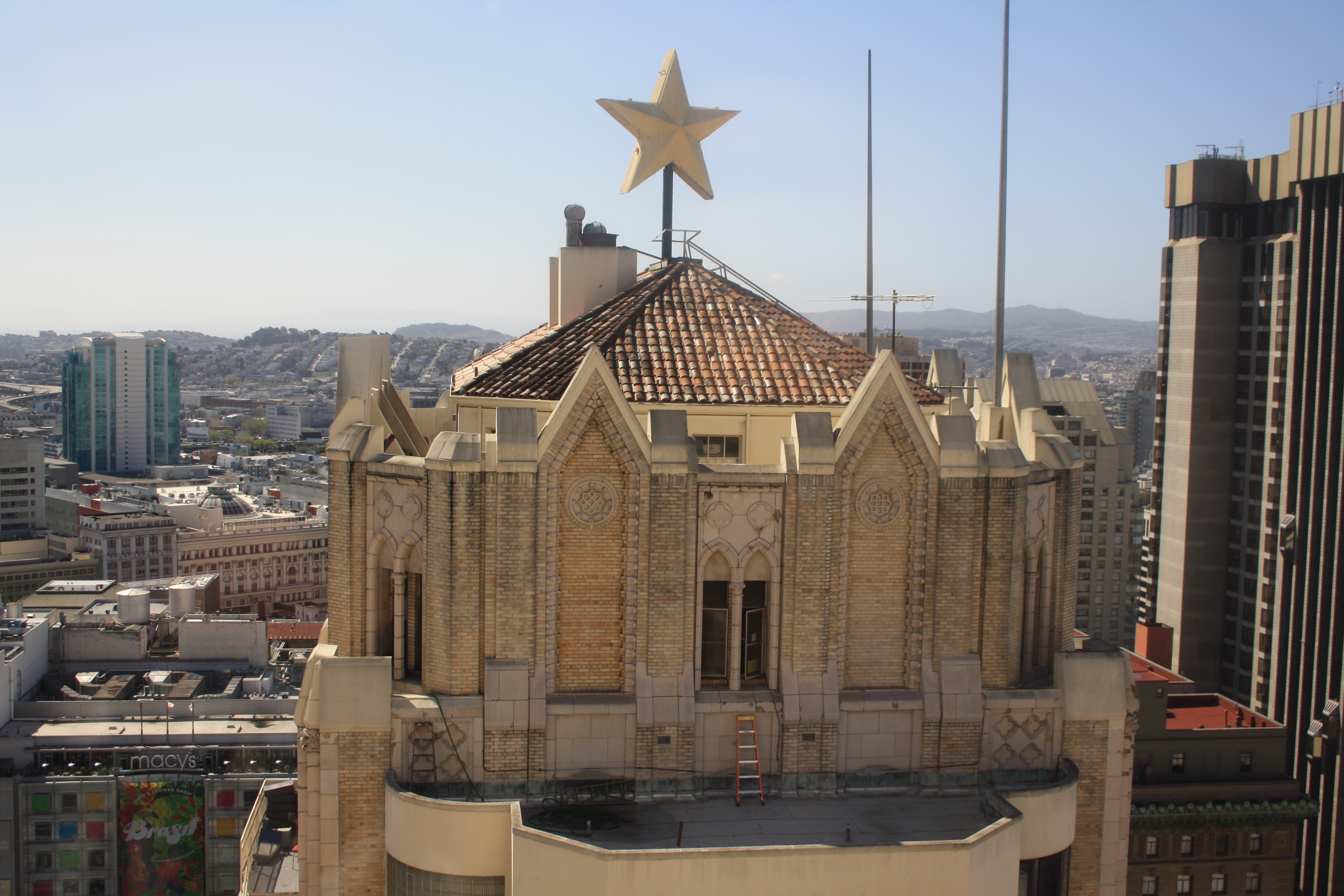
Sir Francis Drake Hotel, San Francisco, view of the top

It was the job of San Francisco architects and engineers Weeks and Day to evoke this Renaissance splendor. Banquet rooms, restaurants and guestrooms were equally elegant, accented and accessorized with everything from fine Irish linens to Reed & Barton Silver. News accounts of the time described the hotel's Persian Room lounge as “enveloped in an aura of romance” accented with midnight blue carpets, black-topped tables inlaid with gold, bronze table lamps with colored lights and a spun glass foundation illuminated by constantly changing lights. Room rates at the Drake in these early years started at $3.50 per night.

== Starlight Room ==
For the past seven decades, the 21st floor Starlight Room has remained part of the San Francisco nightlife. The club offers 180-degree city and bay views and hosted a long-running drag show brunch on Sundays. In 2019, with a change in management, the Starlight Room was revamped and renamed Lizzie's Starlight. Sunday Drag Brunch continues at other locations in the hotel.

== Prohibition Room ==
A Prohibition Room exists just above the elevator lobby and can only be accessed with an elevator stop key. This secret room cannot be found in any of the original blueprints of the hotel as it was built as a way to store bootlegged liquor via Canada from the Moss Beach Distillery that was reportedly given to guests at check-in and through the hotel's servidor doors as a way to circumvent the Prohibition laws of the day. If you look closely at the lobby ceiling, you can still see the tiny peepholes that were drilled through the floor to keep a lookout for police. Separately, if you look closely at the upper lobby ceiling and chandelier you will notice a few peculiar holes in the ceiling. These are said to be from a 1920s wedding when the father of the bride shot off a tommy gun in celebration.

== Haunted hotel ==
It is rumored that guests have reported windows mysteriously open, curtains moving, eerie voices and strange shadows.
