= Tagliente =

Tagliente is a surname. Notable people with the surname include:

- Giovanni Antonio Tagliente, (c. 1460s – c. 1528), Italian author and publisher
- Gina Tagliente (born 1965), American guitarist, better known as Gina Stile
- Carla Tagliente (born 1979), American field hockey player
- The Tagliente family, American owners of the company Tage Inn
