= Kemmons Wilson =

American hotelier (1913–2003)

- Born: Charles Kemmons Wilson; January 5, 1913; Osceola, Arkansas, U.S.
- Died: February 12, 2003 (aged 90); Memphis, Tennessee, U.S.
- Resting place: Forest Hill Cemetery; Memphis, Tennessee, U.S.
- Occupations: Builder; developer
- Known for: Founder of Holiday Inn
- Spouse: Dorothy Elizabeth Lee Wilson (m. 1941; died 2001)
- Children: 5

Charles Kemmons Wilson (January 5, 1913 – February 12, 2003) was an American hotelier. He is best known for founding the hotel chain Holiday Inn in the 1950s.

== Personal life ==
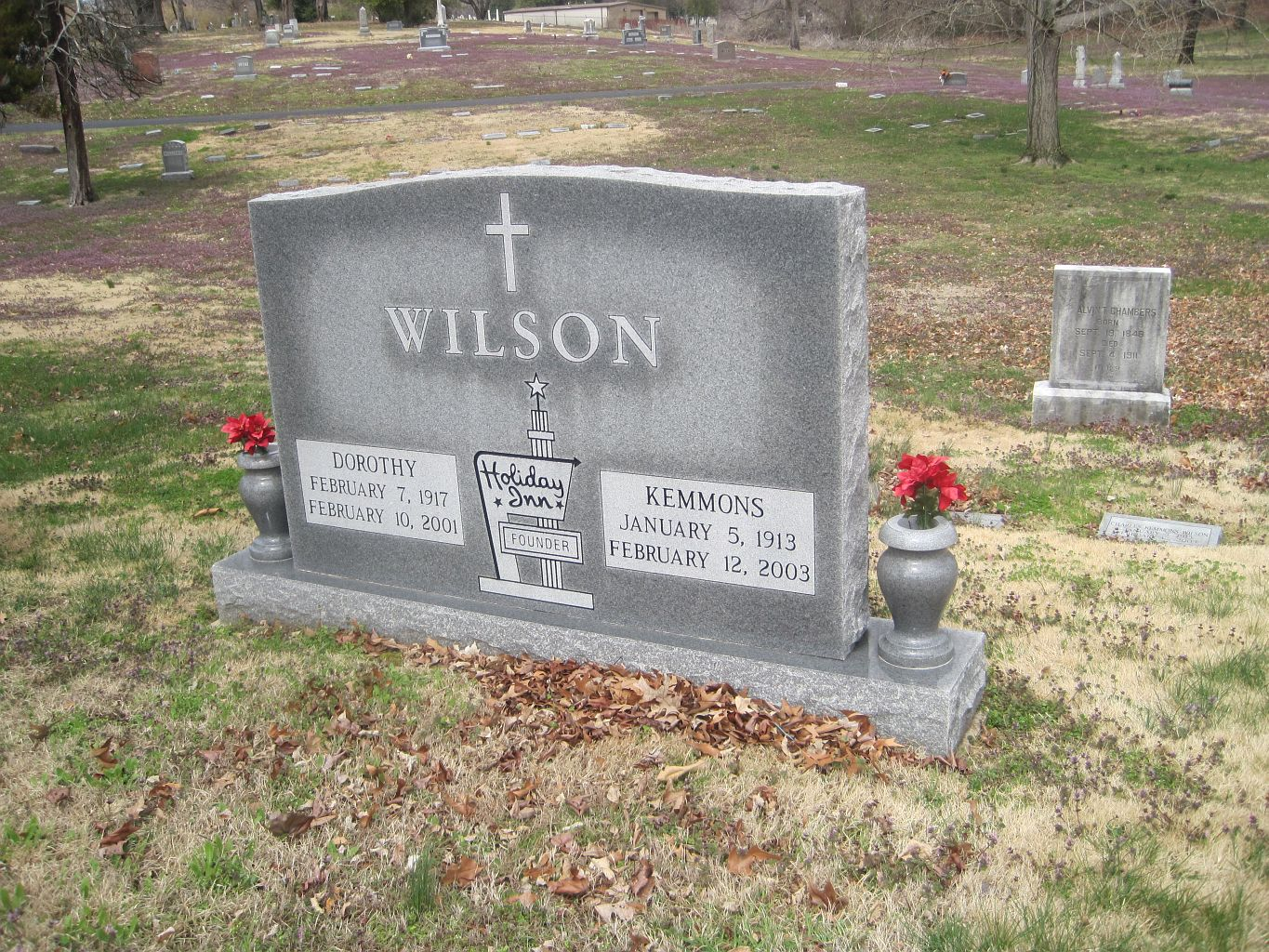
Grave of Kemmons Wilson

He was born in Osceola, Arkansas, the only child of Kemmons and Ruby "Doll" Wilson. His father was an insurance salesman who died when Kemmons was nine months old. Shortly thereafter, his mother, Doll, moved the two to Memphis, Tennessee, where he was raised solely by his mother.

Wilson was married to Dorothy Lee. They had five children: Spence, Robert, Kemmons Jr, Betty, and Carole. Wilson died in Memphis on February 12, 2003, at the age of 90, and is interred there in Forest Hill Cemetery.

== Career ==
Wilson initially came up with the idea after a family road trip to Washington, D.C., during which he was disappointed by the quality of the roadside hotels of that era. The name Holiday Inn was given to the original hotel by his architect Eddie Bluestein as a joke, in reference to the 1942 movie of the same name.

Due to prior investments into the property sector, he had already amassed a sizeable fortune which allowed him to pursue his vision of providing his own hotel chain. He opened the first Holiday Inn motel in Memphis in 1952, and quickly added others to create an entire hotel chain. Holiday Inn went international in 1960. Wilson and his financial partner Wallace E. Johnson (1901–1988) were practicing Christians who saw to the placing of a Bible in every one of their hotel rooms and who donated much of their growing fortunes to charitable enterprises.

In 1957, Wilson franchised the chain as Holiday Inn of America and it grew dramatically, following Wilson's original tenet that the properties should be standardized, clean, predictable, family-friendly and readily accessible to road travellers.

By 1958, there were 50 locations across the country, 100 by 1959, 500 by 1964, and the 1000th Holiday Inn opened in San Antonio, Texas, in 1968. The chain dominated the motel market, leveraged its innovative Holidex reservation system, put considerable financial pressure on traditional hotels and set the standard for its competitors, like Ramada Inns, Quality Inn, Howard Johnson's, and Best Western.

In 1968, Wilson bought Continental Trailways and merged the bus company into Holiday Inn. From then until 1979, when Holiday Inn sold Trailways to private investor Henry Lea Hillman Sr. of Pittsburgh, Pennsylvania, Holiday Inn television commercials were prone to show a Trailways bus pulling into the parking lot of a Holiday Inn hotel.

By June 1972, when Wilson was featured on the cover of Time magazine, there were over 1,400 Holiday Inn hotels worldwide. Innovations like the company's Holidome indoor pools turned many hotels into roadside resorts.

Wilson retired from Holiday Inn in 1979. In 1988, Holiday Corporation was purchased by UK-based Bass PLC, followed by the remaining domestic Holiday Inn hotels in 1990, when founder Wilson sold his interest, after which the hotel group was known as Holiday Inn Worldwide.

Wilson was the founder of many different kind of companies such as Holiday Inn Records and Orange Lake Country Club. After selling his shares of Holiday Inn, he formed Wilson World, another hotel chain.

== Basketball team owner ==
In July 1974, Wilson, along with Isaac Hayes, Al Wilson, Mike Storen and others, bought the Memphis Tams franchise in the American Basketball Association. They changed the team to the Memphis Sounds. They quickly built a strong roster, obtaining players such as Mel Daniels and Rick Mount. The team was the most successful pro basketball team that Memphis ever fielded; it finished fourth in the ABA's Eastern Division, advancing to the 1975 ABA Playoffs before losing the Eastern Division semifinal series four games to one to the eventual 1975 ABA champion Kentucky Colonels.

Following the season, the Sounds were sold to a group in Baltimore, Maryland, where they moved to become the short-lived Baltimore Claws.

== Legacy ==
His 1996 autobiography, Half Luck and Half Brains, tells the story of Holiday Inn.

Wilson was inducted into the Junior Achievement U.S. Business Hall of Fame in 1982.

In 1965, Wilson received the Golden Plate Award of the American Academy of Achievement.

The Kemmons Wilson School of Hospitality and Resort Management at the University of Memphis is named in his honor.

== Additional reading ==
- De Lollis, Barbara. (2007). Holiday Inn chain gives itself a face-lift. USA Today. Retrieved on September 23, 2007, from http://usatoday.com/money/industries/travel/2007-07-19-holiday-inn_N.htm
- Economist, The. (2003). Kemmons Wilson. Economist, 366 (8313). Retrieved September 12, 2007 from Academic Search Premier.
- Hendricks, Nancy. (2006). Charles Kemmons Wilson (1913–2003). [Electronic version]. The Encyclopedia of Arkansas History & Culture. Retrieved on September 23, 2007, from http://encyclopediaofarkansas.net/encyclopedia
- Foster, D. Wayne. retrieved from 2008 audio interview recording; https://web.archive.org/web/20100715152543/http://www.holidayinnrecords.com/.
- Kerr, Robert, & Wilson Kemmons. (1996). Half Luck and Half Brains: The Kemmons Wilson, Holiday Inn Story. Nashville, TN: Hambleton-Hill Publishing, Inc.
- Salomon, Alan. (2001). Dorothy Wilson, Wife Of Holiday Founder, Dies At 84. Retrieved on September 27, 2007, from http://www.hotelinteractive.com.
- Shook, Robert L. & Bingaman, Ron. (1975). Total commitment. New York, NY: Frederick Fell Publishers, Inc.
- Success secrets of Memphis’ most prolific entrepreneur. (1997). [Electronic version]. Business Perspectives. 10 (1). Retrieved on September 23, 2007, from EbscoHost.
- The Kemmons Wilson Family Foundation. (2005). Retrieved on September 23, 2007, from http://kwilson.com/wilsonfoundation.html.
- Weathers, Ed. (1985). The Last Tycoon Is This Man America's Happiest Millionaire? [Electronic Version] Memphis. Retrieved September 23, 2007 from http://www.orangelake.com/kem_archive_07.html.
- Wilson, Kemmons. (1997). What accounts for success? USA Today Magazine, 126 (2628). Retrieved September 12, 2007 from Academic Search Premier.
