= Hyatt Regency Jacksonville =

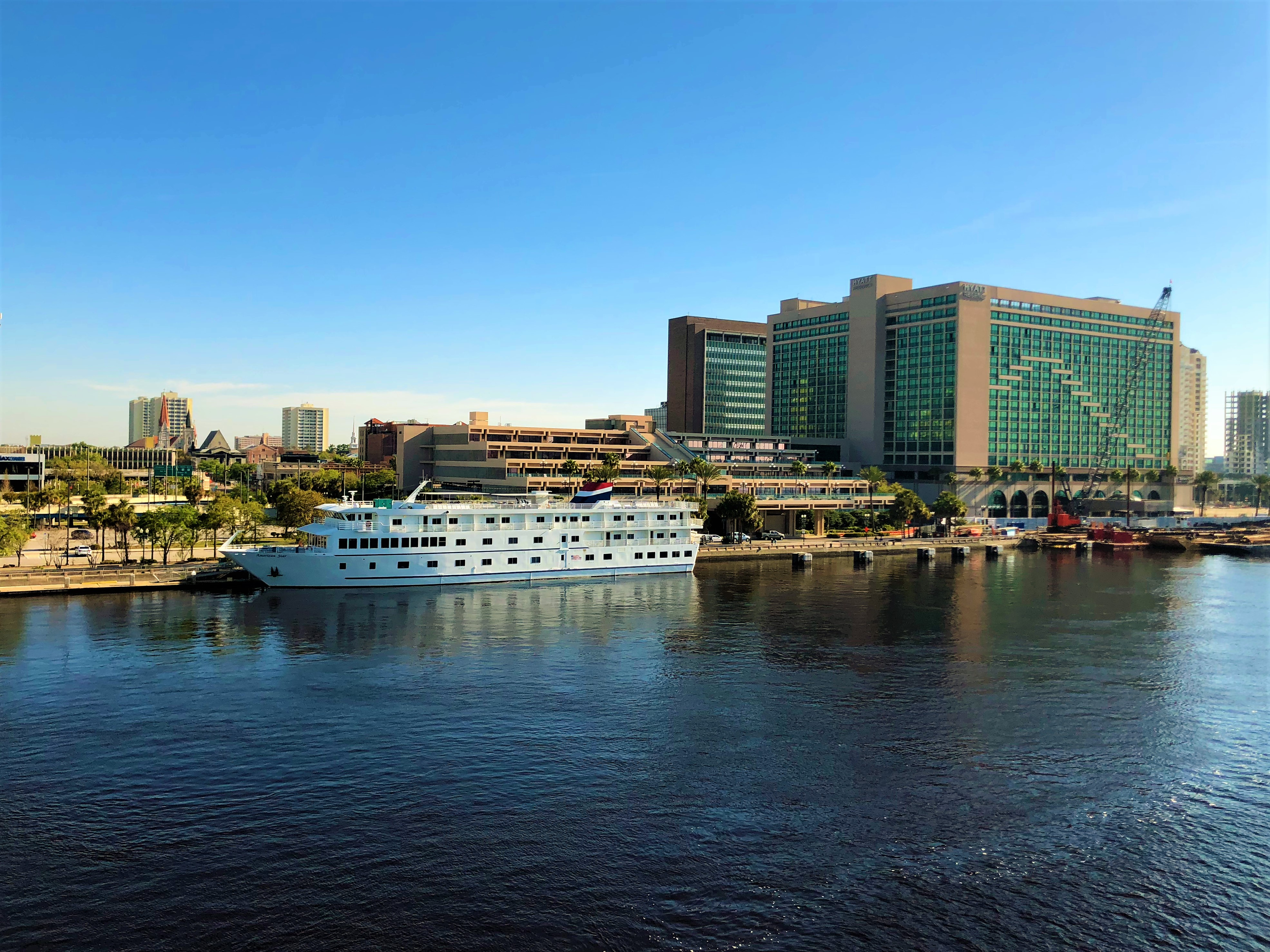
- An American Cruise Lines ship docked next to the Hyatt Regency Jacksonville

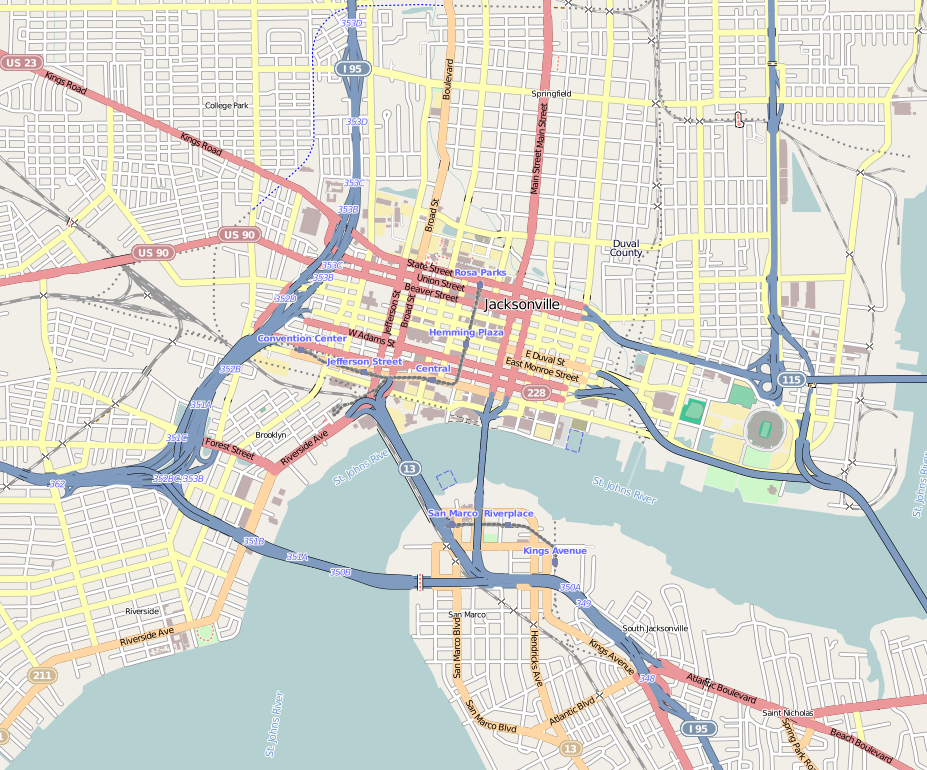
- Location within Central Jacksonville Hyatt Regency Jacksonville (Florida)
- Former names: Adam's Mark Jacksonville

General information
- Type: Hotel
- Location: 225 East Coastline Drive; Jacksonville, Florida
- Coordinates: 30.32506°N 81.65503°W
- Completed: 2001
- Owner: Ramsfield Hospitality Finance

Height
- Roof: 233.37 ft (71.13 m)

Technical details
- Floor count: 19

Other information
- Number of rooms: 951

Website
- Hyatt Regency Jacksonville Official Site

The Hyatt Regency Jacksonville, located at 225 East Coastline Drive, is a 19-story high-rise hotel in Jacksonville, Florida. With 951-rooms, it is the largest hotel in North Florida. At 233.37 ft (71.13 m), the hotel is the 23rd tallest building in Downtown Jacksonville. Sitting adjacent to the St. Johns River, visitors have access to amenity such as the Northbank Riverwalk, Florida Theatre, as well as a rooftop pool.

Completed in 2001 under the Adam's Mark banner, Chartres Lodging Group purchased the hotel in 2005 and rebranded it under the Hyatt Regency flag. The hotel changed hands again in 2017 with Ramsfield Hospitality Finance's purchase of the property.

== History ==
The Adam's Mark Jacksonville hotel opened on February 1, 2001. It was the centerpiece of an aggressive plan to attract more conventions to Jacksonville, revitalize the riverfront and secure a bid for Super Bowl XXXIX. The $126 million hotel had 951 guest rooms, 30 meeting rooms and a total of 110,000 square feet of function space.

The hotel complex incorporated the existing Terrace Building, which once served as offices for the State of Florida. Designed in 1975 by local architect William Morgan as the Daniel State Office Building, the Brutalist building combines Pre-Columbian elements, creating a modern step-pyramid design. The six terraces now serve as event space overlooking the river.

Chartres Lodging Group purchased the 966-room Adam's Mark in 2005, and converted the hotel to a Hyatt Regency on April 1, 2005, after a multimillion-dollar renovation. In 2017, Ramsfield Hospitality Finance's purchased of the property in a $24,700,000 transaction.

In 2017, Hurricane Irma forced hundreds out of the hotel after a mandatory evacuation order was placed on all buildings in Flood Zone B. The first floor of the hotel was severely damaged by flooding, closing it for several months. Finally, on February 14, 2018, the first floor lobby and main entrance were reopened to the public after six months of closure.

== Gallery ==
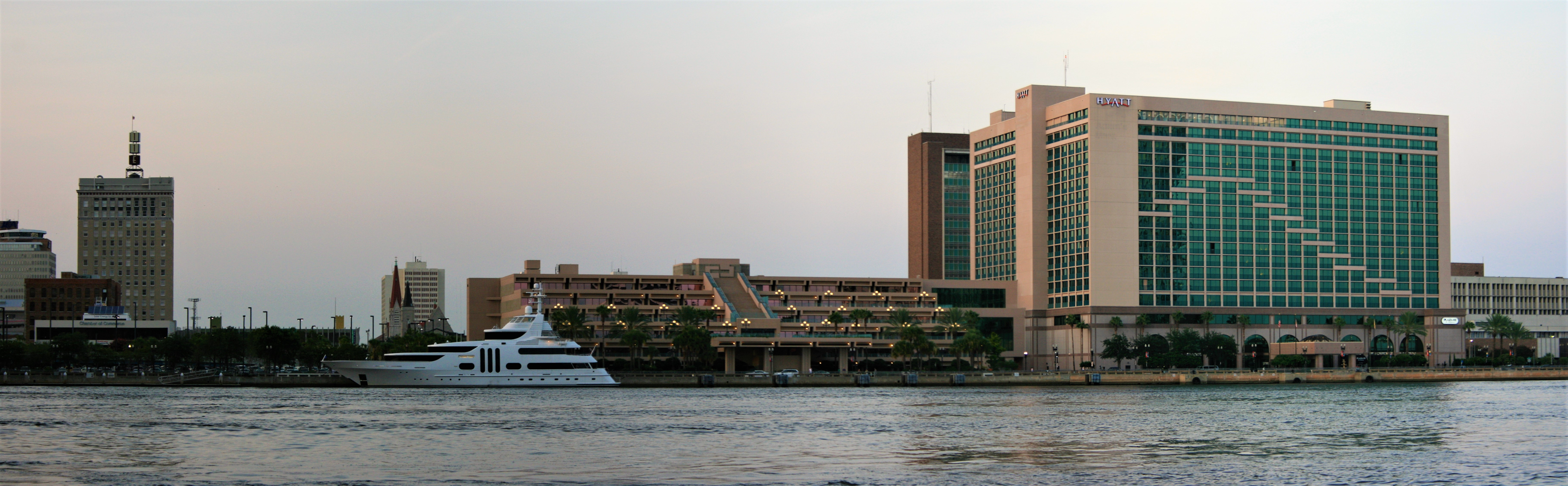

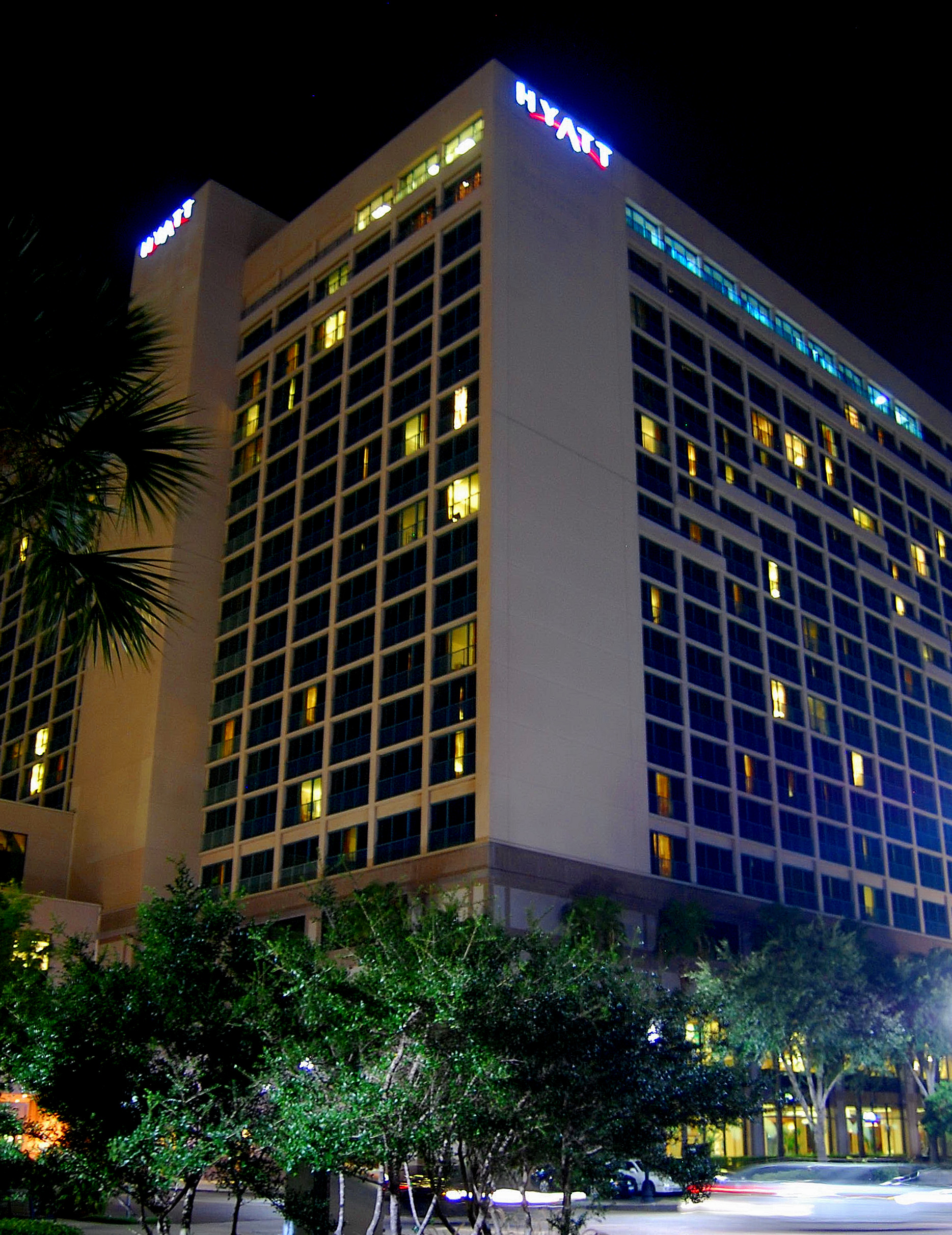

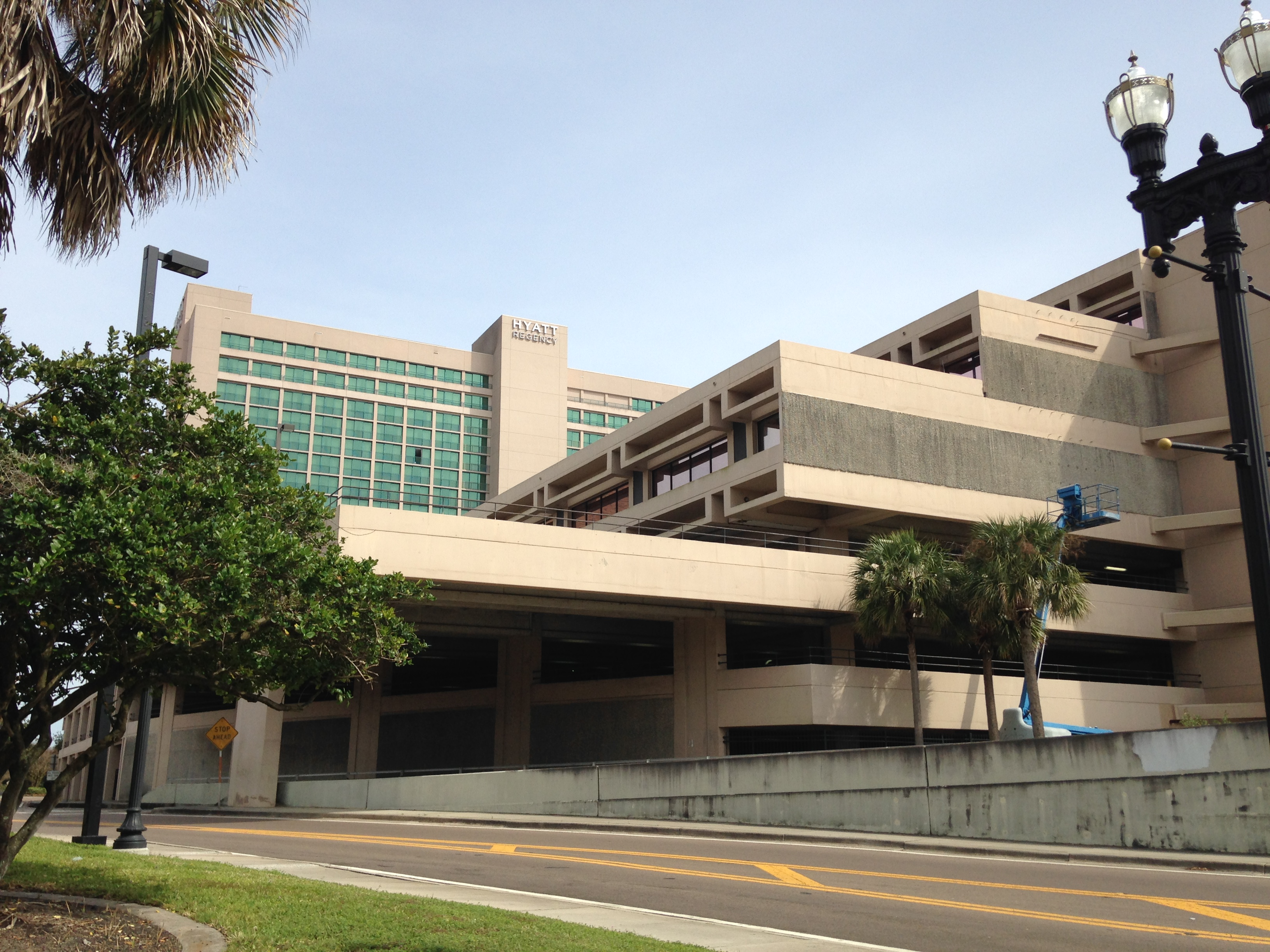

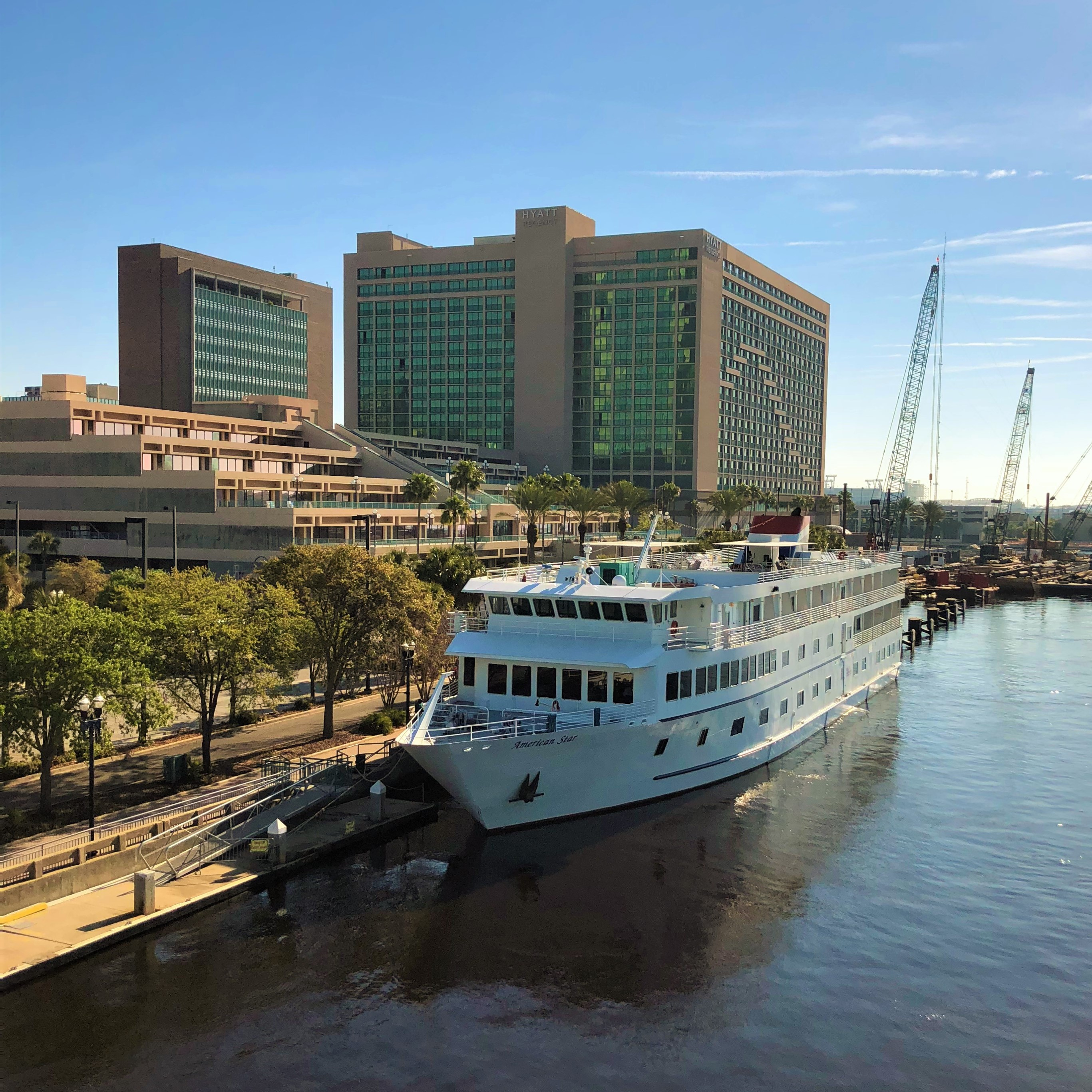

== See also ==
- Architecture of Jacksonville
- Downtown Jacksonville
