= William Morgan (architect) =

American architect and author

- Born: December 14, 1930; Philadelphia, Pennsylvania, US
- Died: January 18, 2016 (aged 85)
- Education: Harvard University
- Occupation: Architect
- Spouse: Bunny (1958–2016; his death)
- Awards: House & Home Award of Merit; Florida AIA Design Honor Award; H.J. Klutho Lifetime Achievement Award

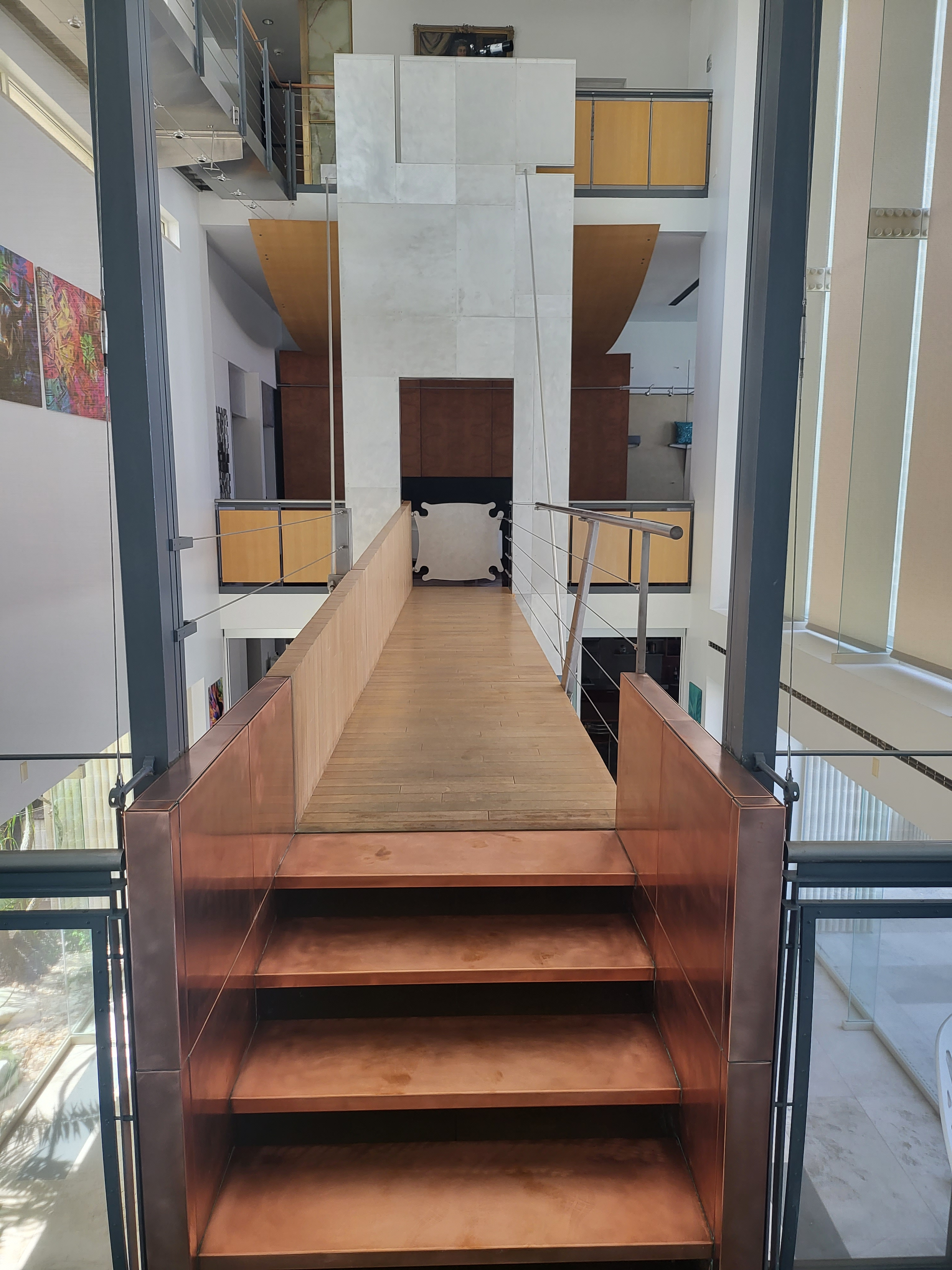
Ormond Beach House

William Newton Morgan, Sr. (December 14, 1930 – January 18, 2016) was an American architect and author, based in Jacksonville, Florida.

One of William Morgan's famous creations is the neo modern house in Ormond Beach, Florida. Built for the Root family, creators of the iconic Coca-Cola bottle and owners of Coca-Cola Bottling, the building is a luxury oceanfront home. It consists of two three-story concrete towers connected by two bridges. It has marvelous metal, glass and stone walls. Solid copper stairs, transparent brass mesh walls, and exotic wood showcase Morgan's modern architecture. Morgan won a National Honor Award from the American Institute of Architects (AIA) for this house: house.

Morgan grew up in Jacksonville and graduated with a bachelor's degree from Harvard University before serving in the U.S. Navy during the Korean War. After the war, he returned to Harvard to study architecture. He studied in Italy on a Fulbright Scholarship (U.S.-Italy Fulbright Commission) and then returned to Jacksonville in 1961 to open his architecture practice in the city where he had grown up.

Three of his designs are included on the Florida Association of the American Institute of Architects' list of Florida's top 100 buildings: The Williamson House in Ponte Vedra Beach, Morgan's own residence in Atlantic Beach and Dickinson Hall at the University of Florida (formerly the Museum of Natural History). He has written five books, including Earth Architecture (2008). In 2012, the University of Florida awarded Morgan an honorary Doctor of Arts degree and made him the first recipient of its School of Architecture's Lifetime Achievement Award. Morgan has been described as a pioneer of sustainable design.

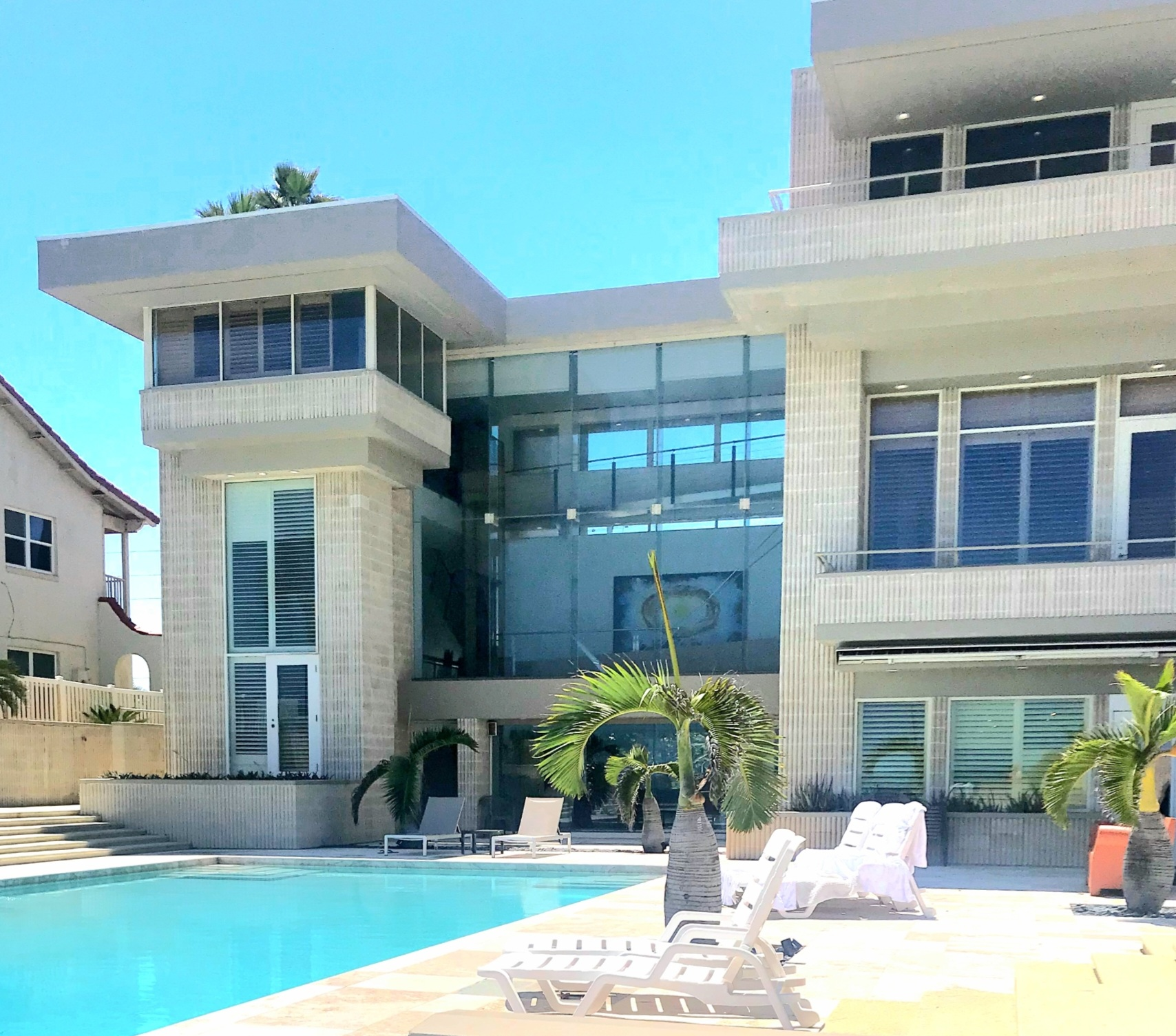
Beach side of the Ormond Beach house

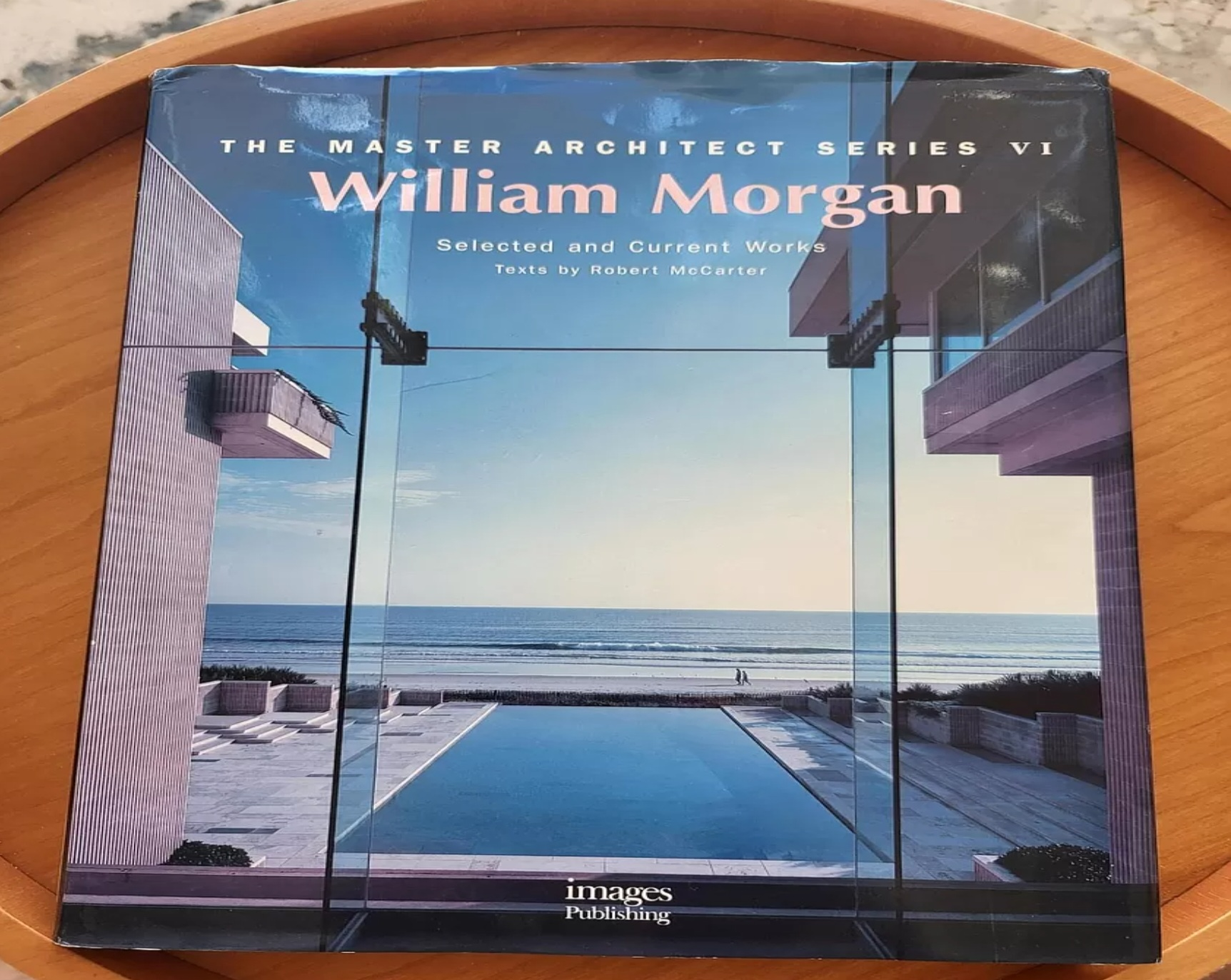
Ormond Beach House on the cover of The Master Architect book

Morgan's five books cover the architecture of pre-industrial cultures, including those in pre-Columbian North America and Micronesia.

He died in Jacksonville after a long illness on January 18, 2016, aged 85.

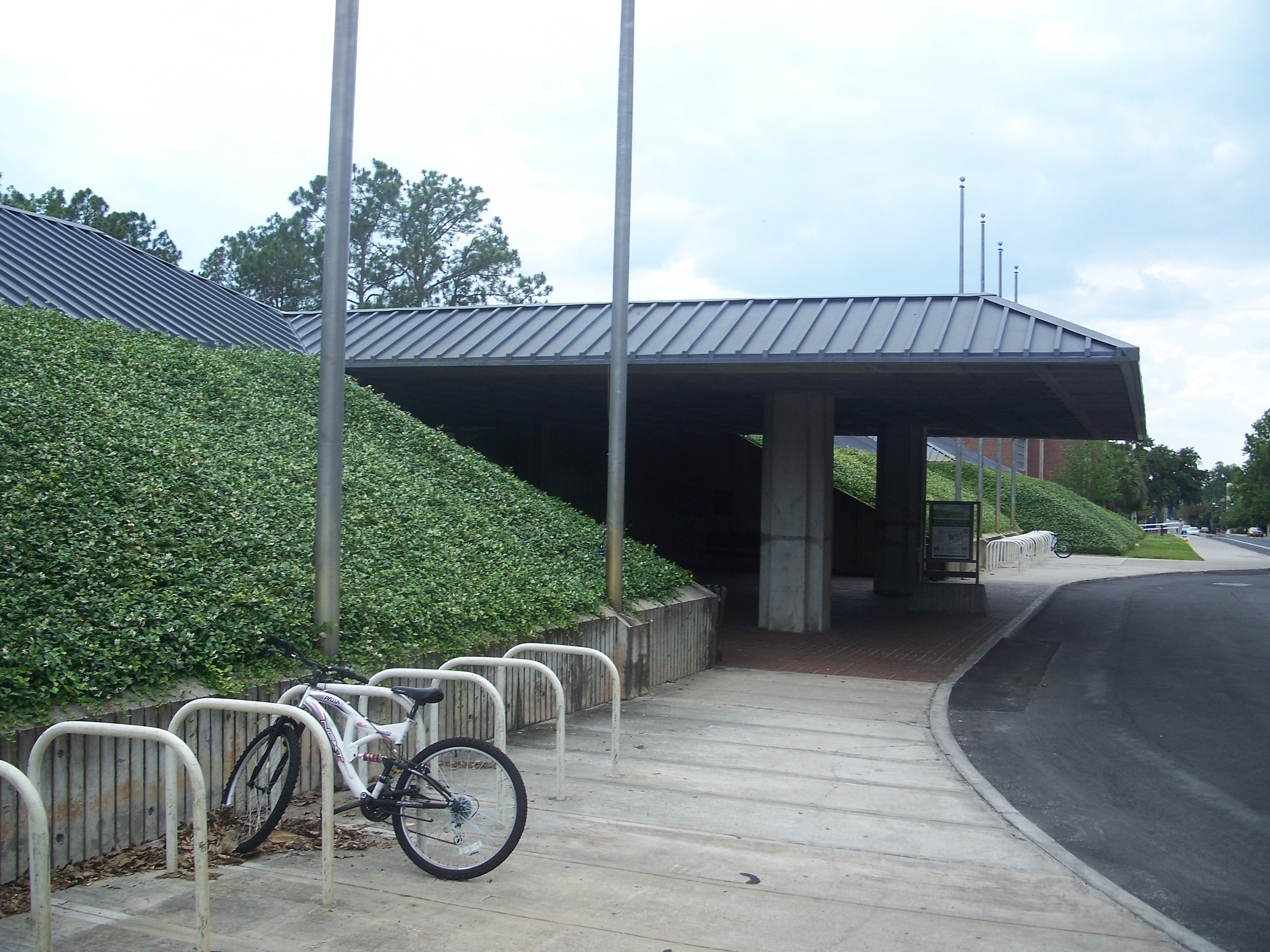
Dickinson Hall entrance at the University of Florida

== Works ==
- Work of William N Morgan, FAIA US Modernist
- Ocean Shore House
- Williamson House, Ponte Vedra Beach (1966), AIA Florida Award of Merit (1964) and listed on AIA's list of Top 100 buildings in Florida
- Museum of Science and History (1969), adjacent to Friendship Fountain, formally the Jacksonville Children's Museum
- Dickinson Hall (1971) at the University of Florida campus in Gainesville, formerly the Museum of Natural History/ Florida Museum of Natural Sciences. The earth-bermed concrete building is listed on AIA's Top 100 Buildings in Florida
- Police Administration Building, Jacksonville
- Daniel State Office Building, Jacksonville (now an annex and parking garage for the Hyatt Regency Riverfront Hotel)
- Morgan Home, Atlantic Beach (1974), Morgan's home in Atlantic Beach, influenced by the stepped structure of the Roman seaside town Herculaneum Listed on AIA's Top 100 Buildings in Florida

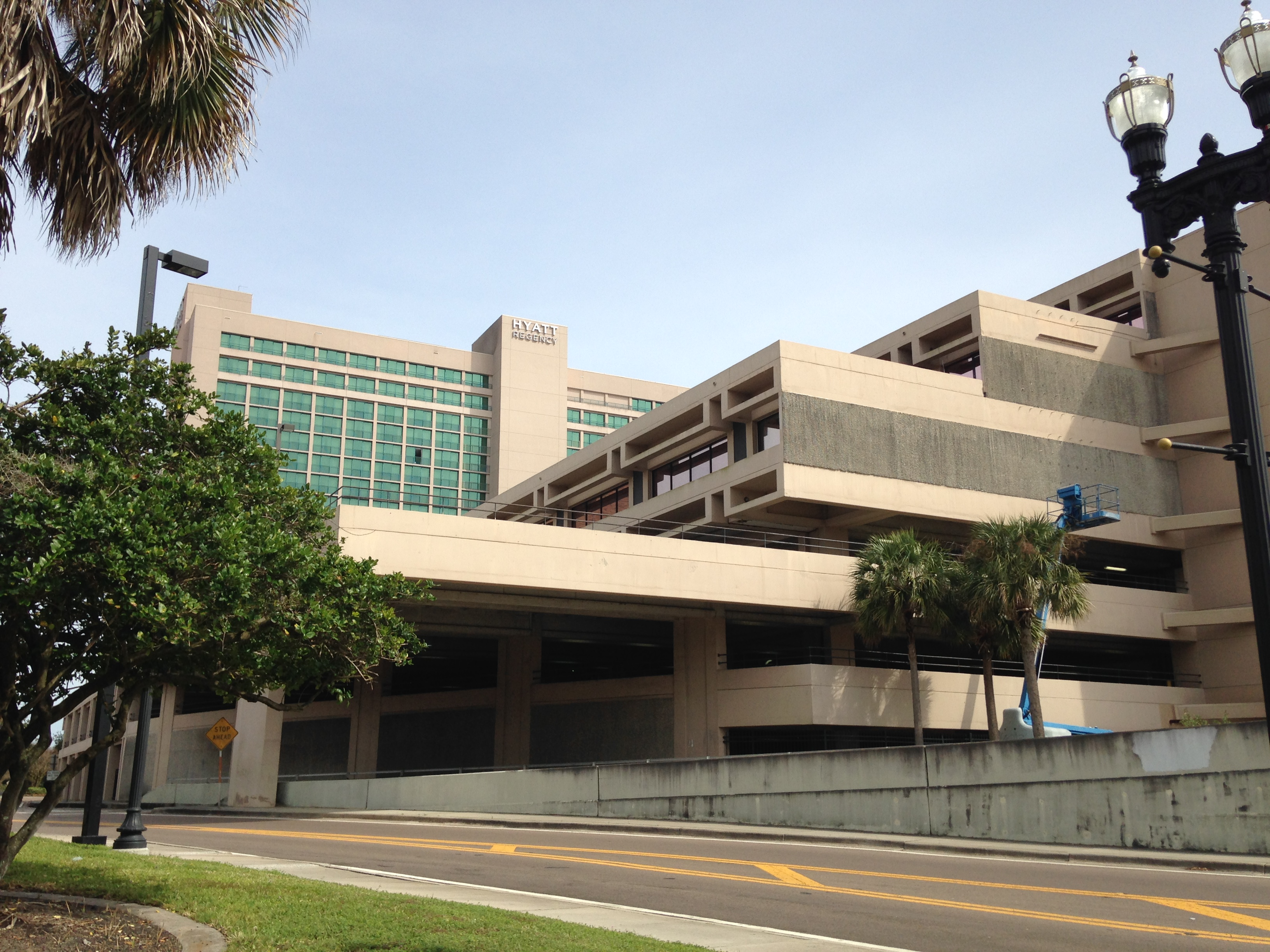
Wing of the Hyatt Regency Hotel in Jacksonville, Florida. Formerly the Daniel State Office Building

== See also ==
- Architecture of Jacksonville
