= Adam's Mark =

Defunct American hotel chain

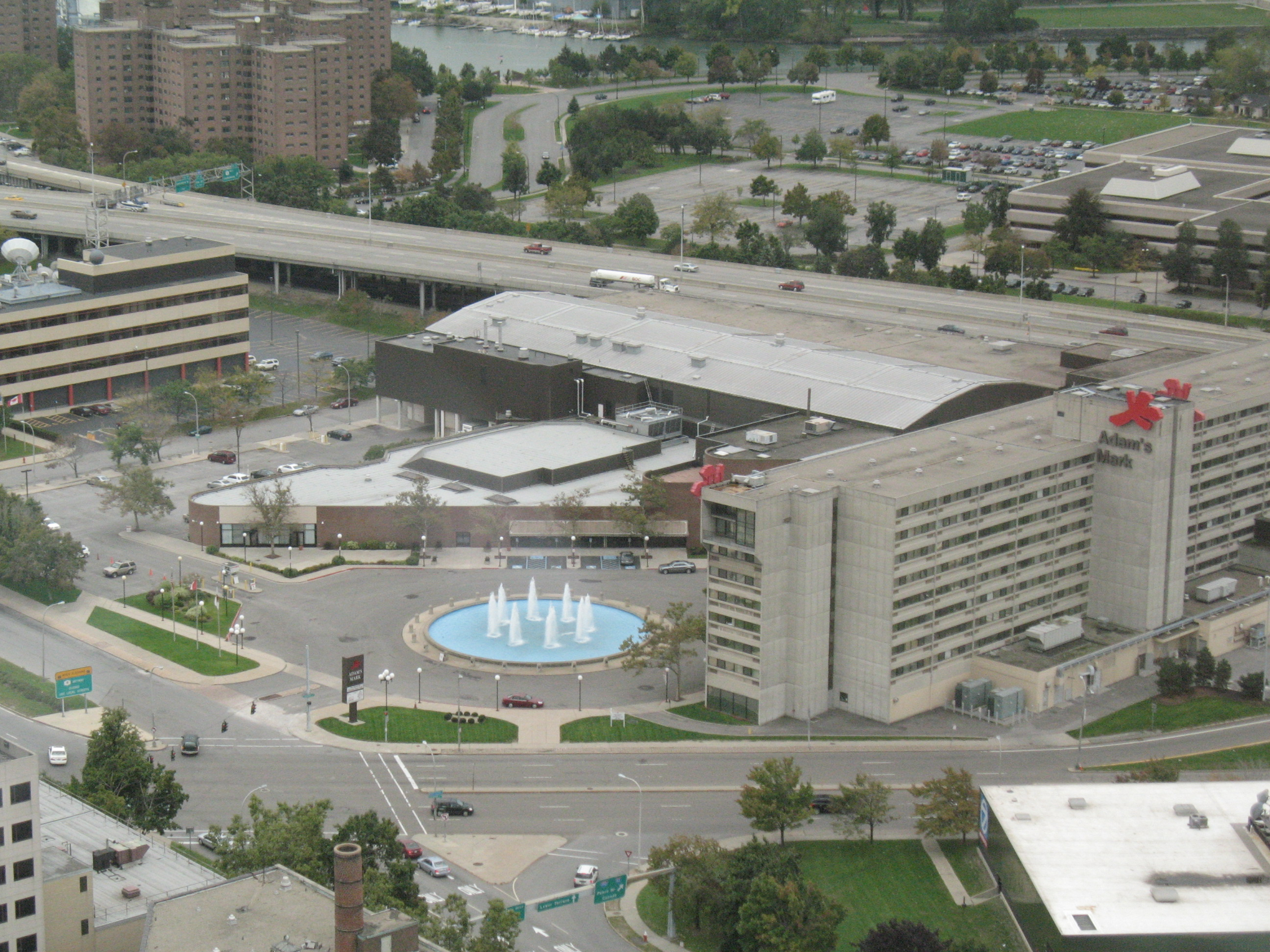
The second-to-last hotel with the Adam's Mark branding was in Buffalo, NY. It eventually lost the branding and was redeveloped and reopened in 2018 as the Buffalo Grand Hotel.

Adam's Mark Hotels & Resorts was a chain of upscale hotels in the United States. The company was headquartered in the HBE Corporation offices in Creve Coeur, Missouri, in Greater St. Louis. Fred Kummer founded the chain in the early 1970s, as well as its parent, HBE Corp.

== History ==
In the late 1990s and early 2000s, Adams Mark faced several civil, state, and federal lawsuits for racial discrimination against Black customers. It was the first hotel chain, in its entirety, to face a United States Justice Department inquiry into racial discrimination for violations of the Civil Rights Act of 1964.

In the 1990s, Adams Mark settled multimillion-dollar racial discrimination lawsuits involving employees and consumers against individual hotels in Indianapolis and St. Louis.

In December 1999, five African–American hotel guests brought a class action lawsuit against the hotel chain after attending the Black College Reunion in Daytona Beach, Florida in 1999. The suit alleged that Adams Mark "charged black guests higher rates, required them to wear orange wrist bands and prohibited black visitors." Additionally, the claimants reported that "rooms rented to blacks had been 'stripped down' and lacked such basic amenities as telephones and maid service; pictures had been removed from the walls and room mini-bars were locked." The Justice Department agreed with the claimants in a nonmonetary settlement, finding that Adams Mark engaged in racial discrimination by "charging Black customers higher prices than Whites and segregating Black customers in less desirable rooms as part of a corporate pattern of discrimination."

The suit, and subsequent 17-month boycott of the chain called by the NAACP, was settled out of court for $8 million in 2000.

In July 2015, new allegations of racism against Adams Mark surfaced. The Daily Kos reported, "A white hotel manager of the Adams Mark Hotel in Kansas City, hung a black slave doll from the doorway of the office with a garbage bag in an apparent mocking of the death of Sandra Bland." Tweets about the incident documented a photograph of the doll hanging by a "white plastic bag noose" around her neck.

== Hotels ==
While once numbering more than 20 large hotels, the chain, because of financial difficulties and changing corporate strategies, sold all of its properties during the 2000s.

- In May, 2004, the Houston location, in the Westchase district, was rebranded as a Marriott.
- In June, 2004, the Tulsa location was sold and rebranded as a Hyatt.
- The Memphis Adam's Mark, originally built in 1975 as the Hyatt Regency Memphis, was sold in 2003, to a joint venture of Dallas-based Crow Holdings, manager of the real estate holdings of the Trammell Crow family, and Wilton D. 'Chick' Hill, the president of Memphis-based Davidson Hotel Co. The hotel underwent a $12 million renovation and reopened as the Hilton Memphis Hotel in 2005.
- On October 3, 2004, the Adam's Mark at Clearwater Beach in Clearwater, Florida closed due to hurricane damage. It was demolished by implosion on October 8 the next year and the Opal Sands Resort opened on the site in February 2016.
- In November 2004, Target Corporation purchased the Philadelphia Adam's Mark (opened in 1965 as a Holiday Inn) closing the 23-story building permanently to make way for a new Target store. On July 11, 2006, an unexpected collapse on the north side of the main tower trapped a construction worker helping to demolish the building. The new Target opened on the site in late 2007.
- In 2005, Chartres Hospitality purchased the 966-room Adam's Mark in Jacksonville, Florida, which it converted to the Hyatt Regency Jacksonville Riverfront after a multimillion-dollar renovation.
- The Florida Mall in Orlando, Florida contained an Adam's Mark which has since been rebranded as The Florida Mall Hotel.
- The Adam's Mark in Dallas was built in 1959 as Southland Center, a multi-tower complex including an office building and the Sheraton-Dallas Hotel. The entire complex was converted into one enormous hotel, run by Adam's Mark, in the 1990s. In July 2006, the hotel completed a $30 million renovation and opened the "Tower Royale by Adam's Mark", a luxury 500-room hotel within a hotel. The hotel was home to many conventions such as Project A-Kon. In 2007, it was sold and reflagged as the Sheraton Dallas Hotel.
- The Adam's Mark in Charlotte was built as the Sheraton Center in 1973 and became the Adam's Mark in 1984. It was sold to the Chetrit Group in 2005 and reopened as The Blake, a boutique hotel. It was converted into two separate hotels in 2013, each occupying one tower. After a $20 million renovation, one tower again became a Sheraton Hotel in August 2013, while the other tower opened as a Le Méridien Hotel in January 2014.
- The Denver property, opened in 1961 as the Denver Hilton, designed by Araldo Cossutta and I.M. Pei, was also a Radisson before joining the chain in 1995. In 2008, it was reflagged as a Sheraton Hotel.
- The St. Louis hotel became a Hyatt Regency in the spring of 2008, with Chartres Lodging Group spending at least $63 million to renovate the property.
- In late August 2009, the Adam's Mark Indianapolis was re-flagged as the Wyndham Indianapolis West Hotel.
- By 2010, the chain had dwindled to just one property, in Buffalo, New York, built as the Buffalo Hilton in 1978. Visions Hotels LLC, of Corning, New York, operator of several smaller size hotels in the Upstate New York region, purchased the property in February 2009 for $7.5 Million. By 2018 this hotel was purchased by developer Harry Stinson. Following renovations and upgrades, the hotel was renamed the Buffalo Grand Hotel.
- The last remaining hotel to bear the Adam's Mark name, in Kansas City, Missouri was originally opened in 1974 as the Sheraton-Royal Hotel. It later became an Adam's Mark, then a Clarion Hotel in 2004, then a Sheraton again in 2007, then a Holiday Inn in 2009, then in April 2015 an Adam's Mark again. The hotel is near the Truman Sports Complex, home of both the Kansas City Chiefs and Royals. The hotel closed "indefinitely" in March 2020 due to the COVID-19 pandemic and was purchased by Community Builders of Kansas City later that year. They have since expressed plans to renovate the building into mixed-income housing or a sports training facility. In 2025, the back area of the building which housed the Coco Key Water Resort was reopened as SW19, an indoor pickleball facility.

== See also ==
- List of defunct hotel chains
