= Kokua Hospitality =

- Industry: Hospitality
- Headquarters: Chicago

Kokua Hospitality is a property management firm affiliated with The Chartres Lodging Group, LLC, of San Francisco, California, United States.

== History ==
The word "Kokua" (pronounced "koh-kooh-ah") is Hawaiian for "to serve, assist, cooperate and pursue knowledge". The company was founded in San Francisco and is currently headquartered in Chicago, Illinois.

Kokua Hospitality was originally an independent hotel management company created by investors Rob Kline and Maki Bara of the Chartres Lodging Group, LLC. The firm announced their merger with Filament Hospitality, effective September 23, 2019. The new company, Sightline Hospitality, combines each company to create a hybrid third-party hotel management company for branded, soft branded, big box independent, and boutique properties.

The company's history of hotel management includes the turnaround of distressed properties, and the restoration of buildings including Inn of Chicago, DoubleTree by Hilton Chicago Magnificent Mile, the Powell Hotel, Hyatt Place Waikiki Beach, Embassy Suites Baltimore Inner Harbor and Grand Historic Venue.

== Kokua branded ==
- Hilton Hotels
- Starwood Hotels
- Choice Hotels International
- Hyatt Hotels

== Kokua independent ==
- The Axiom Hotel (formerly the Powell Hotel), San Francisco
