= Exel Inn =

American lodging chain

- Industry: Hotels
- Founded: Madison, Wisconsin 1972
- Defunct: 2008
- Fate: acquired by Wyndham Worldwide
- Area served: United States
- Key people: David Stauffacher (founder)
- Services: Lodging

Exel Inn was an American lodging chain based in Madison, Wisconsin. It was founded as Interstate Inn in 1972 by David Stauffacher. The first one was located on East Towne Boulevard in Madison. Stauffacher changed the motel's name to Exel Inn in 1974 after he was unable to get a copyright for the chain's original logo, which incorporated the Interstate Highway System shield. Throughout the chain's history, Stauffacher operated it with his family.

In 2008, Stauffacher sold the chain, which at the time comprised 22 hotels, to Wyndham Worldwide. Wyndham re-branded all 22 properties to Days Inn, Baymont Inn & Suites, Super 8 Motel, Howard Johnson's, or Travelodge.
