= Susse Chalet =

American chain of franchise hotels

Chalet Susse International, Inc.
- Industry: Hotel
- Founded: Wilton, New Hampshire (1967)
- Defunct: 2000
- Fate: Sold
- Successor: Roedel Companies
- Headquarters: Wilton, New Hampshire, United States
- Key people: Fred B. Roedel (Founder)

The Susse Chalet brand was a chain of franchise hotels with all locations in the United States in the Northeast and mid-Atlantic states. Hotels featured free local calls, dataports, expanded cable television, and continental breakfast. Most properties offered meeting facilities and swimming pool. The chain was sold in 2000 and the brand phased out shortly after.

== History ==
Fred Roedel founded the chain in 1967 with the opening of the first Susse Chalet Motor Lodge in Nashua, New Hampshire. Roedel had previously been the president of a food company who was constantly traveling and ended up investing in the industry sector. Hotel managers were incentivized based on the savings they could make on each sale.

By 1975, the company, then known as Chalet Susse International, had 15 motels. Early properties were traditional two-story units with all-exterior corridors. In 1983, the company opened its first multi-story facility in Manchester, New Hampshire. This new prototype could have three to five stories with interior corridors and between 105 and 160 rooms. Later, the company introduced bedside "Command Centers" to its rooms; they were desktop devices that included alarm clock, telephone, light and climate controls of the room.

During the 1980s, the U.S. Department of Defense experimented with public/private partnerships to make up for lower military construction funds. Susse Chalet was contracted and developed the Navy's Bachelor Office Quarters in New London, but it turned out to be an expensive alternative for the DoD.

Starting in 1994, armed with a $8 million budget, the group launched an upgrade campaign of all of its locations, targeting the mid-scale customer base of Hampton Inns, Comfort Inns and Courtyard by Marriott. The chain dropped its motel-like locations for larger building properties. A marketing program was launched. The company also launched the brand Susse Chalet Suites.

Over the years, the company sold and renovated older properties to bring them up to the same standard as more recently built properties. Susse Chalet also introduced the Grand Chalet and Susse Saver brands. Grand Chalets were larger properties, while Susse Savers mostly were older two-story locations aimed at budget travelers. The company introduced the Susse VIP reward program which featured free nights after a number of stays and extra amenities like express check-in, late check-out and continental breakfast delivered to the member's room each morning. By 2000, there were 34 Susse Chalet hotels in the Northeast and mid-Atlantic states.

== Sale to Olympus ==
On February 24, 2000, Olympus Hospitality Group acquired the New England–based 34-hotel economy lodging chain. The assets purchased by Olympus included ownership of 27 hotels flying the Susse Chalet Inns, Grand Chalet Inns and Susse Savers flags. The acquisition also included franchise and or management agreements for 7 other Chalet Susse branded properties located in New Hampshire.

In August 2000, Olympus Hospitality Group and Marriott International, Inc. entered into a franchise license agreement under which 20 of Olympus Hospitality's Susse Chalet hotels were to be converted to the Fairfield Inn by Marriott brand. The remaining properties were either converted or sold. In New Haven, Connecticut, Salem, New Hampshire and Portland, Maine, the former Susse Chalet Inns, converted to the Fairfield Inn brand, switched to the La Quinta Inn brand during the 2000s (decade).
