= Alamo Plaza Hotel Courts =

American motel chain (1929–1970s)

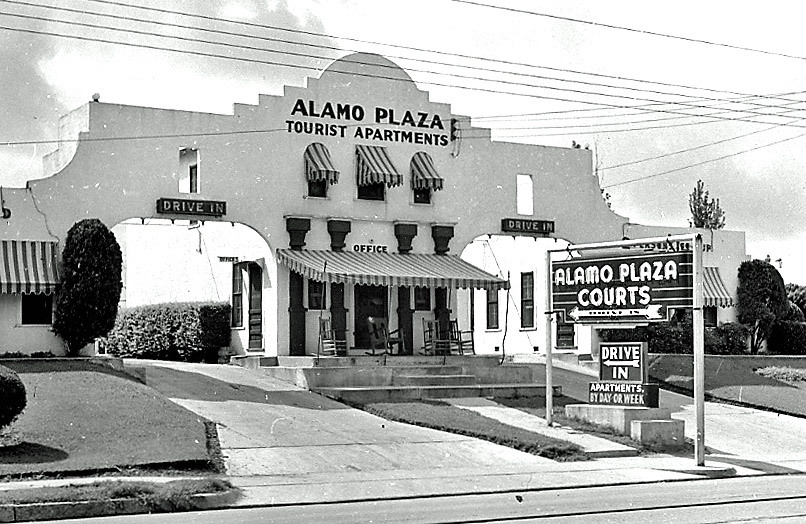
Alamo Plaza Courts in Waco, Texas (1939)

The Alamo Plaza Hotel Courts brand was the first motel chain in the United States, founded by Edgar Lee Torrance in Waco, Texas, in 1929. By 1955, there were more than twenty Alamo Plazas across the southeastern U.S., most controlled by a loosely knit group of a half-dozen investors and operating using common branding or architecture.

Marketed as "Alamo Plaza Tourist Apartments" using distinctive Mission Revival Style architecture, each formed a U-shaped court with multiple buildings fronted by a distinctive façade which mimics the face of the Alamo Mission in San Antonio. These properties attempted to distinguish themselves from other motels or cabins of the tourist courts of their era by introducing amenities such as telephones in each room (1936), Beautyrest mattresses on every bed and later swimming pools and televisions in rooms.

The roadside tactic of using distinctive, non-standard architecture to catch the attention of passing motorists would later be used by other chains, such as the Wigwam Motels which served U.S. Route 66 travellers or the easily recognised orange rooftops of the original Howard Johnson chain.

While the chain's expansion continued through both the Great Depression and World War II (wartime construction was typically near U.S. bases, where the properties were needed to temporarily house military personnel) into the heyday of the 1950s, the use of the Pop Spanish Revival tourist court façade by the chain would end by 1960 and the last new location would open in 1965.

== History ==
=== Initial expansion ===
In 1929, Edgar Lee Torrance built the first Alamo Plaza Hotel Courts in East Waco, Texas; by 1936 the then-seven motels in the Alamo chain would be among the first to install telephones in each individual room.

By 1941, there were ten Alamo Plaza locations and at the chain's peak in 1955 there were more than twenty.

These motels were "motor courts" as they were laid out in a "C" shape with a courtyard in the centre. With Simmons furniture and Beautyrest mattresses on every bed, the Alamo Plaza rooms were marketed as "tourist apartments" under a slogan of “Catering to those who care.” They were typically located on the U.S. Highway system in major cities in the southeastern United States.

Where they did not themselves contain restaurants, they were typically located with a restaurant adjacent or in close proximity.

“We cater to tourists and travelling salesmen. We don’t admit couples with local driver’s licenses”

— Edgar Lee Torrance

Commercially, these operated as a loosely knit form of an ownership chain, in which one small group of investors controlled both the chain and the individual motels within it. As the first location in the Alamo Plaza chain opened in 1929, these pre-date both the referral chains (United Motor Courts: 1933, Quality Courts United: 1939, The Best Western Motels: 1947, Superior Courts United:1950 and Friendship Inns: 1961) and the long list of franchise chains which were to follow in the path of Travelodge (1935) and Holiday Inn (1952).

While the 1950s brought greatly increased automobile traffic, they also brought many new competitors. With 86% of all Americans travelling by car, the number of U.S. motels accelerated from 20000 in 1946 to nearly 60000 one decade later, setting off a race among motel owners to add amenities to remain competitive.

"If the place across the road adds something new," explains W. H. Farmer, owner of a southern chain of Alamo Plaza courts, "you've got to go him one better or lose some customers." Recently, Farmer put in a 50-foot swimming pool at his 73-unit Dallas court "in self-defence." He also bought 65 TV sets outright to keep from "bothering his guests with that quarter coin box."

— Popular Mechanics, July 1956

=== Franchising and redesign ===
A short-lived attempt was made briefly by Bill Farner to franchise the brand at the end of the 1950s. As a response to the Great Sign of the Holiday Inn franchises, a large neon sign design was deployed. The signage, used at both owned and franchised locations, had a star atop an 'A' and an arrow pointing to "Alamo Plaza Hotel Courts". The franchise locations were conversions — existing properties to which either a "member – seek the stars – Alamo Plaza Motor Courts" sign had been added beneath the existing branding or the properties renamed outright to "Alamo Plaza Hotel Courts" with the corresponding neon signage. The franchise attempt was abandoned in 1960, after about a year of use with 50 locations listed in a "Alamo Plaza Hotel Courts — Spend the night where the price is right — free pocket travel guide". One franchised "Alamo Motel" at 19803 N US Highway 441, High Springs, Florida, is still extant with signage (minus the top star) largely intact.

The last of the Alamo properties were built or renovated in the 1960s. These (a facelift to existing Alamo sites in Chattanooga and Charlotte, plus one last new property in Shreveport) use a modern box-like architectural design with a plastic-and-metal face, abandoning the faux-Spanish Mission adobe façade which had traditionally appeared on most Alamo Plaza Hotel Courts.

=== Decline ===
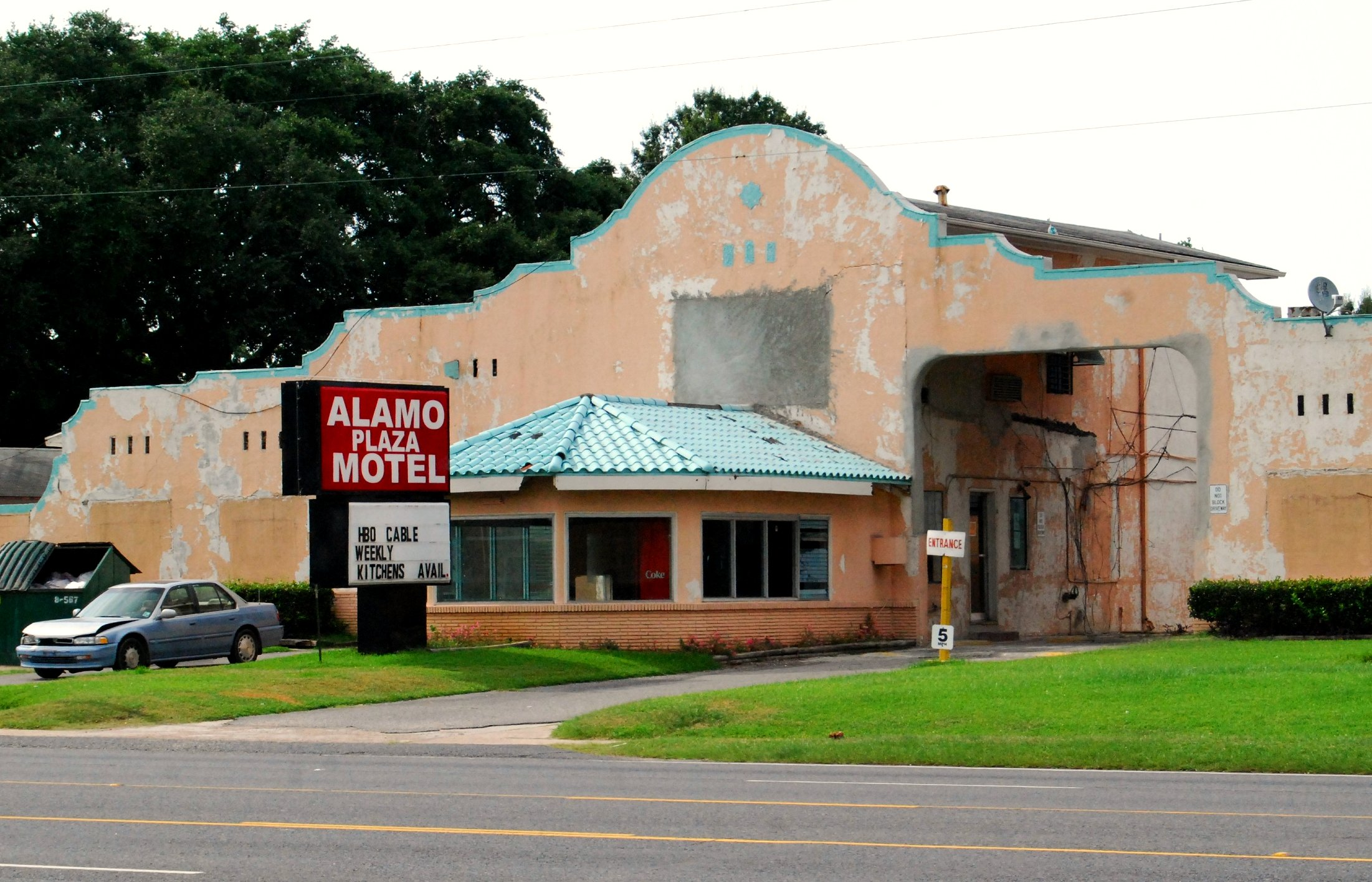
This motel in Baton Rouge, seen in 2008, was one of the last maintaining the "Alamo Plaza" name. It has since rebranded as "American Inn".

As the original owners retired or left the chain, the individual motel properties were sold off by the respective families. Some retained the Alamo branding for decades after the chain itself had vanished, slowly deteriorating under new ownership as the motels had been built around a US Highway system by then long bypassed by new interstate highways. Most had been sold by the 1970s, fallen into decline in the 1980s and 1990s and in many cases would be ultimately demolished.

In a few instances, these properties were converted to other uses.

The last Alamo was built in 1965 along I-20 in Shreveport, Louisiana, as a fully modern motel with a version of the updated metal-plastic façade; it is now a Travelodge.

=== Ownership and investors ===
A loosely connected chain in which several owners operated multiple locations each, the group was largely built around founder Edgar Lee Torrance, his former employee William Farner (and Farner's business partner Charles Mooney) and various others brought into the fold by Torrance or Farner. The resulting chain was a collection of nominally independently owned motels that depended on the personalities of various owners.

E. Lee Torrance (founder), a former used car dealer, owned eleven of the twenty-two Alamo Plaza locations. A local Waco judge, Drummond W. Bartlett, was initially co-owner of the one original Waco Alamo property but had no further involvement in the expansion of the Alamo Plaza chain.

William (Bill) Farner worked for Torrance at the Waco location initially; he later would go on to build new locations in the chain (mostly in Texas) in partnership with Charles Mooney. Farner was also involved with efforts to bring new owners into the chain, including a brief entry into franchising at the end of the 1950s.

W.G. "Mac" McGrady, a nephew of E. Lee Torrance, operated a group of "St. Francis Hotel Courts" in Alabama cities which used the original architecture and were Alamo in all but name. The motels' picture postcards promoted these as "The three largest and finest courts in Alabama's three largest cities, Mobile, Montgomery and Birmingham. Total of 255 rooms, tile baths, carpeted floors, room telephones, air-conditioned, hotel service and fine restaurants – Approved by AAA and Duncan Hines."

Conversely, E. L. McLallen used the name and features but not the Alamo architecture. A lumber merchant by trade, he entered the chain by purchasing the Memphis Alamo Plaza not long after Torrance had started it. McLallen soon began his own branch (Nashville, Louisville, Knoxville, and Indianapolis) using primarily Colonial-style architecture.

William P. and Mary W. Robinson, as newcomers to the hospitality industry, were introduced to the chain by Farner and Mooney. They opened one 29-unit "Plaza Hotel Court" in Columbus, Georgia, in 1941 using Alamo architecture. Initially serving Fort Benning during World War II, the location was renamed Alamo Plaza Hotel Court with Torrance's blessing.

Milton Stroud of Waco established the Park Plaza Courts (see below), using a similar façade but different branding, mostly on or near U.S. Route 66. These were not part of the main Alamo chain but used the same architect and design.

== Locations ==
=== Alamo Plaza Hotel Courts ===
Location	Status
Atlanta; 2370 Stewart Ave SW (US 41)	Built in 1948 on the Dixie Highway. Stewart Avenue and surrounding area severely deteriorated in the 1970s, becoming a crime-ridden red-light district. Alamo Plaza itself was the scene of a notorious 1993 double murder. It would be renamed as the Santa Fe Villas, its façade altered and the buildings renovated by the city as housing for the homeless. Even the street itself would be renamed as the Metropolitan Parkway.
Augusta; 1250 Gordon Highway	Opened April 20, 1958, by Charles Mooney, originally served US military installation Fort Gordon. In decline by the 1980s, it managed to avoid demolition long enough to be restored beginning 1998 for use as a members-only resort for adult gay males. The exterior color scheme was replaced with light blue, pool open, café open weekends-only, gay bar adjacent.
Baton Rouge; 4343 Florida Street	Opened March 30, 1941, by Bill Farner and Charles Mooney, pool added in 1958, adjacent Alamo Grill (later Alamo Plaza Restaurant, proprietors Mr. and Mrs. Willard Nelson) closed 1969. Property declining steadily since a change of ownership in the mid-1980s. Remodeled in 2016 as studio/efficiency apartments.
Beaumont; 1930 College Street	Built 1938, Bill Farner and Charles Mooney, first location not built by Torrance himself. This "Alamo Plaza Motel" now in decline as the "Deluxe Inns and Suites", portions of the building are boarded up as of 2006.
Birmingham; 1930 29th Avenue South (US 31)	Opened 1951, acquired 1953 by W.G. "Mac" McGrady (St. Francis Hotel Courts) 29th Avenue (then part of US 31) at East Avenue (now Independence Drive), expanded 1960 from 67 to 112 rooms, became Vulcan Motor Lodge. Demolished, replaced with Independence Plaza.
Charlotte; 2309 N. Tryon St.	Opened 1936 by E. Lee Torrance, remodeled 1962 with metal-plastic façade. Used Alamo name (also Crown Motor Inn at one point circa-1985). Target of complaints under nuisance abatement laws in the 1990s. Demolished.
Chattanooga; 3000 South Broad Street	Opened 1952 in industrial area, café on-site, expanded 1961 with more rooms and porcelained steel and aluminium face. US 11/41/64/72. Closed 1991 by court order due to ongoing criminal activity and code violations, demolished 1996 by municipal order. Site is now Rocky Tops Custom Countertops Inc.
Columbus; 2115 Buena Vista Road	Opened 1941 (during World War 2) using Alamo architecture as "The Plaza Hotel Court" by William P. and Mary W. Robinson, 29 units, initially served Fort Benning. Demolished, site is now a Piggly Wiggly supermarket.
Dallas; 712 Ft. Worth Highway	1940 by Bill Farner and Charles Mooney, allowed to decay into 21st century, demolished 2010 for mixed-use development.
Gulfport; 2230 Beach Blvd.	Service road north of U.S. Route 90, prime beachfront location originally near military base. Demolished circa-2003, replaced with high-rise condos.
High Springs (franchise); 720 NW Santa Fe Blvd (US 41)	El Rancho changed name and signage to "Alamo Plaza Hotel Courts" and "spend the night where the price is right". Now 19803 N U.S. Route 441. Does not have Alamo architecture. Still extant as "Alamo Motel"; "hotel courts" signage remains except for illuminated top star.
Houston; 4343 Old Spanish Trail	Likely 1940s by Bill Farner and Charles Mooney. Original hotel-style porters and room-service long gone. Property deteriorating for many years and renting rooms hourly ($10/2hrs) at one point, remained "Alamo Plaza Motor Hotel" at least until 2006. Pool gone. Now low-cost housing.
Indianapolis; US 40	Opened 1952 by E. L. McLallen, did not use Alamo architecture. Demolished for new development.
Jackson; US 80	Opened 1940 by Lee Torrance. US 80 at Terry Rd. (old U.S. Route 51). US 51 now rerouted, then bypassed by Interstate 55. Demolished for new development.
Knoxville	E. L. McLallen (Nashville, Louisville, Knoxville and Indianapolis) did not use Alamo original architecture but did use the name. This location is listed on a few old postcards. Likely demolished.
Little Rock; 3200 W. Roosevelt Road (US 70)	Opened 1938 by Lee Torrnace, US70 / US67, façade removed 1950s, likely demolished. Adjacent "Alamo Plaza Grill" operated by Curdie family, sold 1961.
Louisville; Dixie Highway (US 31W/US 60)	E. L. McLallen, 31 rooms, 5 mi S of Louisville on US 31W/60, did not use Alamo original architecture. Demolished, now site of a Logan's Restaurant.
Memphis; 2862 Summer Avenue (US 70)	Opened October 1939, 48 units with individual garages. Renovated 1957, adding air-conditioning, carpeting; eventually included 42 separate buildings, a landscaped courtyard, and a 20-by-50-foot swimming pool. Demolished, now a used-car lot. Direct competitor to the original Kemmons Wilson Holiday Inn motel, 4941 Summer Avenue (built 1952, demolished 1990s).
Mobile; Government Boulevard	Opened 1951 by W.G. "Mac" McGrady (St. Francis Hotel Courts, later St. Francis Motor Hotel). Façade replaced with brick front in the 1960s. Demolished circa-1990, replaced by shopping mall.
Montgomery; 3101 Mobile Highway (US 31)	Opened 1951 by W.G. "Mac" McGrady (St. Francis Hotel Courts). Demolished.
Nashville; US 41/70S	Opened 1941 by E. L. McLallen, these "Alamo Plaza Courts" did not use standard Alamo architecture but were Colonial Revival with columns at all entranceways, chimneys and dormers on the two-story office building. Now just a memory.
New Orleans; Airline Highway	Circa 1940. Closed/demolished in the mid-1950s, likely to make way for interstate highway construction.
New Orleans (franchise); Chef Menteur Hwy	Plantation Motor Hotel converted during Farner's short attempt to franchise the brand. US 90 and US11 east. Likely long gone.
Oklahoma City; 4407 South Robinson Street	Opened 1937 by Lee Torrance, only Torrance-owned motel to serve US 77. An Alamo Plaza Restaurant was adjacent. Demolished.
Raleigh; 1 Louisburg Road	Circa 1950, Lee Torrance. Demolished sometime in the early 1980s. A Sinclair Gas Station was adjacent. Louisburg Road now splits off Capital Road (U.S. Route 1) as U.S. Route 401.
Savannah; 1600 W. Bay Street	Opened 1955 by Charles Mooney, 65 units, still extant as "Alamo Plaza Motel" with original façade but with modern signage and severe deterioration with peeling paint. Highways have been rerouted onto Interstate 16.
Shreveport; 2012 Greenwood Road	Opened August 1, 1935, as third motel by Lee Torrance, now demolished.
Shreveport; 1280 N. Market Street	Opened 1947 by Lee Torrance, now demolished.
Shreveport; 2134 Greenwood Road	Last new Alamo (1965), used metal-plastic face modern architecture instead of original adobe façade. Serves Interstate 20. Became "Alamo Inn" in the 1970s, now a Travelodge.
Statesboro (franchise); US 301	Existing motel changed name and signage to "Alamo Plaza Hotel Courts" circa-1960 during brief franchising attempt. Description from 1966 postcard "Formerly Hodges Motel, 4 miles north of Statesboro, on U.S. 301. 'Shortest Route to Florida'. TV in Rooms, Swimming Pool, Radiant Heat, 100% Air-Conditioned, Tile Baths, Tubs and Showers. Enjoy Home Cooked Food in Our Ultra-Modern, Air-conditioned Restaurant. Mr. & Mrs. Lloyd Hodges, Owners, Mgrs". Status unknown.
Tyler; 1800 W. Erwin Street	69-room hillside "Alamo Plaza Motel", opened July 5, 1931, by Lee Torrance, does not use Alamo architecture. Dallas Highway (TX 64) west of U.S. Route 69. Second E. Lee Torrance property ever built. Accommodated army Signal Corps students (April 1942 – July 1943) during World War II. Currently the American Inn.
Waco; Elm Street	Original location, 1929. E. Lee Torrance, Alamo Plaza Hotel Courts "tourist apartments" with original architecture on 900-block of Elm Street. US 77 has since been rerouted onto Interstate 35 alignment.

Other properties with independent ownership but modeled on the Alamo façade architecturally:

- El Sueño, U.S. Route 66, Claremore, Oklahoma, built by Jack Sibley in 1938, became Adobe Village Apartments.
- Lakeview Courts, west of Oklahoma City, Oklahoma
- Park Plaza Courts (six locations) by Milton and Lemuel Stroud of Waco. E. Lee Torrance provided the Strouds with access to Alamo's architect and design but these are an independent chain with an Alamo-like façade.

=== Park Plaza Courts ===
A chain of six motel courts, these were architecturally similar to the Alamo model but share neither name nor ownership with the main Alamo Plaza chain. These were originally built by Milton Stroud (Sr.) and his brother Lemuel Stroud, with the first location opened in West Tulsa, Oklahoma, in 1942. Milton Stroud (Jr.) and his wife Mickey were also involved with the chain after 1950.

Locations were chosen to be at one-day travel intervals by motorcar. Four of the six locations were in U.S. Route 66 cities: St Louis, West Tulsa, Amarillo and Flagstaff.

The remaining two Park Plaza Courts were in Raton, New Mexico and Texarkana, Arkansas.

The St. Louis location, opened 1948 as the fifth in the Park Plaza series, had an adjacent Golden Drumstick restaurant operated by the same owners.

The sixth and final location (East 7th at Hickory, Texarkana) was on U.S. Route 71. Its postcards touted "On U.S. Hwys 67-71-82, 2 minutes from downtown. Phone 222767. 85 lovely rooms and suites. Year-round guest control air-conditioned. Swimming pool and playground. Room phones, T.V. radios, room service. Town House Restaurant on premises. Also affiliated Park Plaza Motels in Fort Worth, Amarillo, Raton, Flagstaff, St. Louis, Town Park in Memphis, Belmont in Dallas, Catalina in Wichita Falls."

Most of these are now gone; the original West Tulsa location was sold by the Stroud family to Dorothy Harrison, but by the 1980s was serving as refuge for the homeless.

The New Grande Courts in Sullivan, Missouri, were owned by Abe Schwartz but modelled architecturally on the design of the Park Plaza Courts in St. Louis, which in turn were based on the Alamo Plaza design.

== See also ==
- List of motels
