= Wilson World Hotels =

US hotel group

- Industry: Hotels
- Founded: 1984; 41 years ago in Kissimmee, Florida
- Founder: Kemmons Wilson
- Defunct: 2003
- Headquarters: Memphis, Tennessee
- Area served: United States
- Parent: Kemmons Wilson Companies

Wilson World Hotels was a small chain of hotels that catered to travelling business people and families. The chain was founded in 1984 by Kemmons Wilson, who was also the founder of the successful Holiday Inn hotel chain. The company was also named after the founder. The company's first hotel was opened in 1984 near the entrance of Walt Disney World in Kissimmee, Florida. Through the late 1990s and early 2000s the properties were slowly sold off to other hotel companies. The final Wilson World Hotel closed in Dallas, Texas in June 2003.
