= Denizen Hotels =

Former proposed hotel chain brand

- Industry: Hospitality
- Founded: 2009
- Parent: Hilton Worldwide

Denizen Hotels is a former proposed hotel chain brand of Hilton Worldwide which never materialized following legal proceedings by a competitor.

== Development ==
Hilton targeted the new brand to mark the company's entry into the global lifestyle brand sector, and introduced it on March 10, 2009, in Berlin, Germany.

However, in April 2009, Starwood Hotels and Resorts filed suit against Hilton and its Denizen brand, accusing two former Starwood executives including Ross Klein, the former president of Starwood Hotels of stealing and taking trade secrets to Hilton for the development of the new brand. Hilton suspended development of the Denizen brand and placed the team on paid administrative leave. On April 24, 2009, a US district judge enjoined Starwood and ordered Hilton to stop development of its brand pending further investigation of corporate espionage. In December 2010, Hilton Worldwide agreed to settle the lawsuit with Starwood. Though full terms were confidential, part included a $75 million cash payment from Hilton and another $75 million in hotel-management contracts. In addition, Hilton was subjected to an injunction that prohibited the hotel chain from introducing any lifestyle hotels for two years. Two court-appointed monitors supervised Hilton’s operations to ensure it complied with the injunction.

Hilton subsequently announced its lifestyle brand Canopy by Hilton in October 2014.
