= Renaissance Orlando Resort and Spa =

Hotel at Walt Disney World

- Former names: The Royal Inn; Hotel Royal Plaza

General information
- Location: 1905 Hotel Plaza Boulevard; Lake Buena Vista, Florida; United States, Walt Disney World
- Coordinates: 28°22′37″N 81°30′25″W
- Opened: October 1, 1972
- Owner: InSite Development Group and Quadrum Global

Other information
- Number of rooms: 394

Website
- www.marriott.com/en-us/hotels/mcobu-renaissance-orlando-resort-and-spa/overview/

The Renaissance Orlando Resort and Spa is a 394-room non-Disney resort on the property of Walt Disney World Resort in Lake Buena Vista, Florida. It is located in the Disney Springs Resort Area on Hotel Plaza Boulevard.

== History ==
The resort opened as The Royal Inn on October 1, 1972. It was the first non-Disney operated hotel to open at Walt Disney World. The land the hotel sits on is owned by Disney. In the 1970s, the hotel's name was changed to the Hotel Royal Plaza.

Orlando time share developer David A. Siegel bought the Royal Plaza for $12 million in 1992. He sold it for $43.5 million to Prudential Real Estate Investors and Heller Financial in 1998, as part of a $200 million divorce settlement. In 2001, Fine Hotels Corp. of Wellesley, MA bought the hotel from Prudential and Heller for $47 million. The resort closed in August 2004, due to damage from Hurricane Charley. It reopened in 2006 after a major renovation.

In 2012, a joint venture between Weston, Florida-based InSite Group and London-based Cube Capital bought the property and renovated it. It reopened as the B Resort & Spa on June 16, 2014.

The hotel was renovated again in 2023 and joined Marriott's Renaissance Hotels brand in 2024 as Renaissance Orlando Resort & Spa.

== Facilities ==
The hotel has one restaurant, American Kitchen, a poolside bar and lounge, in-room dining, as well as The Grove Cafe’ and Brew for lighter fare.
