= Chartres Lodging Group =

American advisory and investment firm

Chartres Lodging Group, LLC
- Company type: Private
- Industry: Investment in hospitality
- Founded: 2002; 24 years ago (San Francisco)
- Headquarters: San Francisco, California, US
- Key people: Rob Kline, President and co-founder Maki Bara, managing partner and co-founder
- Services: Investments in hotels, resorts, and restaurants
- Website: chartreslodging.com

The Chartres Lodging Group, is an American advisory and investment firm focused on the property management, asset management, renovation and development of lodging assets. It has been responsible for over $9 billion of hospitality investments and assets comprising over 100 upscale and luxury hotels, resorts and conference centers. As of 2006, the company is responsible for a $4 billion, 12,000-room portfolio of luxury and upscale hotels, conference centers and resorts in the United States.

== History ==
The company was founded in San Francisco by principal investors Rob Kline and Maki Bara.

In 2006, Chartres Lodging formed its own internal property management company, Kokua Hospitality, designed to provide additional property management resources.

Chartres' most significant acquisition was the purchase of the 4,867-room Adam's Mark hotel portfolio from HBE Corp., of St. Louis, and renovating, re-branding and repositioning plans for five properties encompassing high-profile, convention-oriented hotels in Dallas, Denver, St. Louis, Indianapolis and Buffalo.

The company's history of hotel investment includes the turnaround of various distressed properties including Inn of Chicago, DoubleTree by Hilton Chicago Magnificent Mile, the Allerton Hotel Chicago, Hyatt Place Waikiki Beach, and Hotel Novotel New York Times Square.

== Portfolio of hotels ==
- Aloft Washington National Harbor, Maryland
- DoubleTree by Hilton Chicago Magnificent Mile, Illinois
- Embassy Suites Baltimore Inner Harbor and Grand Historic Venue, Maryland
- Hilton Omaha, Nebraska
- Hyatt Regency Jacksonville Riverfront Jacksonville, Florida
- Hyatt Regency St. Louis at The Arch, Missouri
- Inn of Chicago Magnificent Mile Chicago, Illinois
- The National Conference Center, Lansdowne, Virginia
- Novotel New York Times Square, New York City
- Radisson Blu, Minneapolis
- Radisson Lexington New York City, New York
- Sheraton Dallas, Texas
- Sheraton Denver, Colorado

== Previously owned properties ==
=== In the United States ===
- The Allerton Hotel, Chicago, Illinois
- DoubleTree by Hilton Metropolitan Hotel, New York City, New York
- Hyatt Place Waikiki Beach, Hawaii
- Pan Pacific San Francisco, California
- Sir Francis Drake, California

=== in Japan ===
- Alivila Nikko Resort Okinawa
- Fusaki Resort Village Ishigaki
- Hineno Station Hotel Osaka
- Hotel Centraza Hakata Fukuoka
- Hotel Ishigakijima Ishigaki
- Hotel Karuizawa 1130 Karuizawa
- Hotel Nikko Chitose
- Hotel Nikko Narita
- Hotel Nikko Tokyo
- Hotel Paco Asahikawa
- Hotel Paco Kushiro
- Hotel Paco Obihiro
- Kushiro ANA Hotel Kushiro
- Hotel Universal Port Universal Studios
- Namba Oriental Hotel Osaka
- Nikko Hotel Kawasaki
- Oriental Hotel Hiroshima
- Oriental Meriken Park Kobe
- Royal Pines Hotel Moriguchi Osaka
- Royal Pines Hotel Urawa Saitama
- Royal Pines Hotel Wakayama
- Shin-Urayasu Oriental Tokyo Disneyland
