= Tage Inn =

Hotel Company

Tage Inn Corporation was a hotel company in New England that developed, owned and operated mid-scale hotels without food & beverage during the late 1980s and early 2000s. The company was founded by Joseph P. Tagliente and his son Joseph D. Tagliente with the opening of their first hotel in Milford, Massachusetts in 1989. From there they developed three additional hotels in Andover, Massachusetts by 1992, Somerville, Massachusetts in 2000 and Manchester, New Hampshire in 2003. In 2004, the Tagliente Family decided to sell their hotels to the La Quinta Hotel Corporation for US$26 Million. La Quinta subsequently converted the hotels to La Quinta Hotels & Suites.
