= Patio Hotels =

British hotel chain

Patio Hotels Group
- Company type: Private
- Industry: Hotels
- Founded: 1983
- Headquarters: Aberdeen, United Kingdom
- Number of locations: 6 (at peak)
- Area served: Scotland, France, Israel
- Website: patiohotels.com

The Patio Hotels Group was a British hotel chain established in 1983 with hotels in Europe and Israel.

== History ==
The first three hotels were built in France in the 1980s followed by the Patio Eilat Resort Hotel in Israel. Two hotels were later opened in Scotland – one in Clydebank (completed in 1990) and another in Aberdeen (completed in 1996). The last hotel left in the chain, the Aberdeen hotel, was revamped in September 2008 and now operates as Doubletree by Hilton.

== Loyalty program ==
A rewards scheme, originally called the Premier Club, was launched in 1998. The scheme was later rebranded to the Platinum Club. Members benefit from exclusive bar and dining facilities within the Platinum Club Lounge.
