= Development in Abilene, Texas =

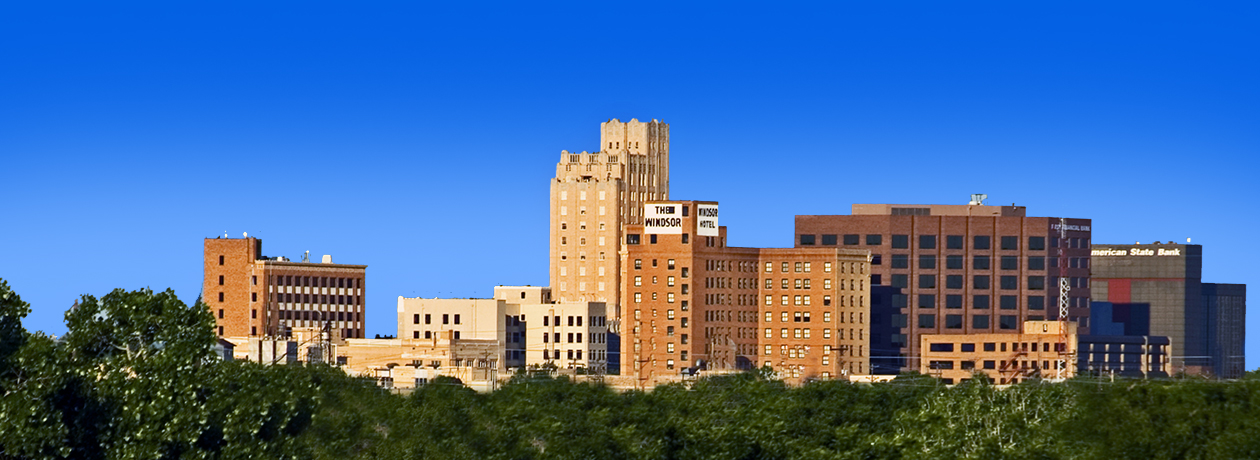
Downtown Abilene skyline.

Abilene, Texas, has steadily become the retail, residential, business, medical, and overall center of the surrounding Big Country. Commercial development was especially boosted in 2007, with several multimillion-dollar projects throughout the entire city. Most of the recent development is concentrated in roughly four areas in Abilene: Southwest Drive, Catclaw Drive, and Buffalo Gap Road near the Winters Freeway to the southwest, as this area becomes a strong commercial sector as well as a good residential district; Buffalo Gap Road, Beltway South, and US Highway 83/84 near and beyond the outskirts of the city in the south with several housing developments; Loop 322 area and Oldham Ln to the southeast, also near and past the edge of the city with a mix of several residential subdivisions as well as the start of commercial growth; and State Highway 351/Ambler Avenue near Interstate 20 to the northeast, also a combination of staple retail development, similar to the southwest commercial development, and the beginnings of residential growth with a new apartment complex and growing subdivisions.

Development in Abilene is accelerated in part by a growth-oriented City Council, the Development Corporation of Abilene (DCOA), the Abilene Chamber of Commerce, the Abilene Texas Convention & Visitors Bureau, the Abilene Industrial Foundation and the Abilene Preservation League. A renewed interest in Downtown has prompted the inception of the Downtown Abilene Initiative, a coalition of individuals, business and institutions to overhaul the infrastructure of Downtown. The Abilene City Council recently approved a tax incentive for developers and business owners in efforts to overhaul the infrastructure of Downtown and the Treadaway Boulevard corridor, projected to be worth $19.76 million.

== Downtown ==
Downtown Abilene has been recently reinvigorated by a mix of grassroots efforts and formal efforts through the Abilene Chamber of Commerce's can Not Downtown Abilene Initiative. Plans are in the works to open a hotel near the Abilene Convention Center making the city's accommodations more desirable to visitors. The Initiative is the product of several studies commissioned by the City and the Chamber.

The City Council's efforts to incentivize a downtown convention hotel have not been reciprocated by Taylor County. In January 2019, the County Commissioner denied a request for a 50% tax abatement over a 10-year period. The City stated the project's success was not solely dependent on the county's ability to envision a prosperous future. Mayor Williams is confident that private sector forces will help the massive project succeed.

In March 2019, the City Council approved the incorporation of the Abilene Convention Center Hotel Development Corporation, a local government corporation (LGC). The LGC, a separate entity from the city and the council, is now responsible for the planning and execution of the project.

In April 2019, the City Council approved plans for a Master Development Agreement with Garfield Public/Private. The plan involves a mix of funding sources, the majority of which is non-tax related. The city is responsible only for $12.4 million of the $66.64 million needed to complete the project.

East Highway 80 divides Downtown into two districts: the North district, anchored by the Abilene Convention Center and a lively business atmosphere; and the South district, referred to as SoDA District (South of Downtown Abilene), anchored by the 20-story Enterprise Building, many government buildings and a budding nightlife scene.

Growth along the Pine Street Corridor has exploded due to the addition of the Texas Tech Health Sciences Center and major construction on Hendrick Hospital. The two institutions connect Ambler Avenue to Downtown.

=== Commercial and Shopping ===
- The Historic Paramount Theatre
- Antique Station
- Lone Star Dry Goods
- Frontier Texas!
- King's Barbers
- National Center for Children's Illustrated Literature (NICCL)
- The Grace Museum
- CityLink
- Abilene Convention and Visitors' Bureau
- Abilene Farmers' Market
- Abilene City Hall
- The Fire Escape
- Furniture Junk-It
- The Arrangement
- Vletas
- Casa Authentique
- Under One Roof
- Texas Star Trading Co.
- Betty & June
- Barnes & Williams Drug Center - Pharmacy and Gifts
- SoDA District Courtyard - A new event space in the SoDA District great for weddings, receptions, live music, fundraisers & art exhibits.
- Loft on 6th
- Wild Ones Boutique

=== Residential ===
- Parramore Square - An urban community of townhomes and patio homes in an historic neighborhood adjacent to Downtown Abilene. Phase I is all detached townhomes.
- Hotel Wooten
- Windsor Hotel

=== Restaurants and Bars ===
- Beehive Saloon
- The Local - Taquería
- Sockdolager Brewing Company
- Pappy Slokum Brewery
- The Mill Winery
- Amendment 21
- Vagabond Pizza
- Grain Theory Brewing Co. - Newly minted brewery planned to be house in redevelopment of a core Downtown block on Pine Street. Renovated building is planned to include a boutique, rooftop bar and underground club. Planned opening early 2019.
- Fat Boss's
- 1708 Coffee Lounge
- McKay's Bakery
- Monk's Coffee
- Cypress Street Station
- Bogie's Downtown Deli
- The Flour Shop Bakery
- JC's Lighthouse Chocolates and Food Park

== Southwest ==
Much of Abilene's commercial and retail growth is concentrated in two opposite areas of the city. In the southwest area of the city, along and near Southwest Drive, Ridgemont Drive, and Buffalo Gap Road, several new retailers and businesses have brought new names to Abilene as this area continues to attract many to new shops, hotels, and restaurants. In addition, even some new residential projects have sprouted throughout the city's southwest side, many of which are within blocks of Rebecca Lane.

Construction on several arterial and connective streets is indicative of the area's strong commercial growth. Southwest Drive was widened from 2 lanes each direction (plus central left-turn lane) to 3 lanes each direction, totaling 7 lanes from Catclaw Drive to S. Clack Street and 6 lanes under the Winters Freeway. This project was completed in late 2008. Also, Catclaw Drive was reconstructed and reconfigured to create 2 northbound lanes, 1 southbound lane, and 1 shared left-turn lane. The frontage roads of the Winters Freeway, S. Clack Street and S. Danville Drive, were reconstructed from S. 14th St to the US 83/84 & Loop 322 interchange, with restriping and minor widening done between Southwest Drive and Buffalo Gap Road from 2 lanes each to 3 lanes each.

Southwest Drive and Catclaw Drive have become the source of multiple new businesses, many of which are national chains with their first Abilene location. Two new shopping centers have been created in the area since 2005, Shops at Abilene and Abilene Marketplace, though the latter currently only has one tenant. Also, Buffalo Gap Road and Ridgemont Drive have been a constant area for retail and business and still continues to develop. Here the Mall of Abilene has been a strong spur for commerce since the 1980s, after it was constructed in 1979. Contained is a list of several new businesses brought to this commercial district since the turn of the century.

=== Shops ===
- Shops at Abilene - Shopping center built in 2005 at the southeast corner of Southwest Drive and Catclaw Drive, where tenants include Bed Bath & Beyond, Michael's, Ross Stores, PetSmart, Payless ShoeSource, James Avery, Old Navy, and several more chain, and even local, stores and restaurants
- Abilene Marketplace - Currently only includes Kohl's, the only department store in the city outside of the Mall of Abilene, but has plenty of room for more construction for future tenants
- The Shops at Abilene Village - Construction began in 2018. Includes Academy Sports + Outdoors, Burlington, PetCo, Party City, Cheddar's, and Panera Bread.
- Ashley's Furniture Homestore
- Lithia Toyota of Abilene - Relocated car dealership
- New stores at the Park Central, Plaza at Park Central, and Catclaw Corner shopping centers
- OrangeTheory Fitness - On Catclaw Drive north of Rebecca Lane

=== Hotels ===
- MCM Elegante Suites - Near Mall of Abilene on Ridgemont Drive. Full Service Hotel
- Courtyard by Marriott - Near the Mall of Abilene on Ridgemont Drive
- Hilton Garden Inn - Near the Mall of Abilene on Ridgemont Drive
- Sleep Inn - On S Danville Drive just south of Southwest Drive

The following four hotels are all located on a short stretch of Catclaw Drive north of Southwest Drive.

- Holiday Inn Express - Limited-service hotel
- Wingate Inn & Suites - Limited-service hotel
- La Quinta Inn & Suites - 72-room limited-service hotel
- Candlewood Suites - 72-room extended-stay hotel

=== Restaurants ===
- Red Robin - Located on Catclaw Drive at the front of Shops at Abilene
- Taylor County Taphouse - On Catclaw Drive north of Rebecca Lane
- Cold Stone Creamery - Within Shops at Abilene
- Rosa's Café & Tortilla Factory
- Chick-Fil-A
- Logan's Roadhouse
- Jason's Deli - Fairly new addition to Catclaw Corner, across from Shops at Abilene
- Buffet City - In Park Central at Southwest Drive and S. Clack Street

=== Residential ===
- The Reserve at Abilene - New apartments being constructed close to the commercial area, located in a larger apartment region
- Hampton Hills - Fairly new subdivision with access by Rebecca Lane, close to Dyess AFB
- Sandy Creek addition - Small court also close to Dyess AFB, will probably expand in the future
- Butterfield Meadows - A planned mixed-use development zoned for a mix of office, retail, and detached and multifamily housing
- Garden Grove - Small development of compact houses along Garden Grove Lane
- Silver Oaks - off Buffalo Gap Road, just south of Woodlake Drive
- Greystone Estates - New subdivision at south end of Catclaw Drive currently with few houses
- Waterside - Though slightly off Buffalo Gap Road, this upscale gated community is still being developed and offers a secluded neighborhood
- The Villages at Wyndham - Adjacent to Waterside, this new subdivision contains a greenbelt area and easy access to key medical and shopping areas

== South ==
Along the edge of the city and beyond city limits, several new subdivisions have come to fruition in only the last few years. South of Antilley Road, these subdivisions mainly use two routes to enter the city, Buffalo Gap Road and US Highway 83/84, where many of these places are located. This surge of residential growth is evidence of both recent outward growth in the city and the desire for open spaces often exhibited by urbanites as well as suburbanites.

=== Buffalo Gap Road ===
- Southern Meadows (Rio Mesa) - Created by the extension of a small existing road, nearly up to capacity
- Indian Trails - Located off Antilley Road, currently has very few houses
- Bella Vista Estates - A wealthier subdivision located southeast of Beltway South and Buffalo Gap Road
- Tuscany Trails - off Beltway South, roughly midway between Buffalo Gap Road and US 83/84

=== US Highway 83/84 ===
- Skyline Estates - Small subdivision off Beltway South near the US 83/84 overpass
- Saddle Creek Estates - Also a wealthier subdivision that has expanded since its inception in the mid-1990s
- Lakes at Saddle Creek - Expanded continuously since 1999, reached capacity in 2008

The following subdivisions are located outside of the city limits.

- Mountain Shadows Ranch - Another wealthier subdivision, created in 2006, which still has very few houses
- Remington Estates - Average-class community located at Clark Road and US 83/84, nearly at full capacity
- Deer Valley Estates - off US 83/84 just south of Bell Plains Road
- Mountain Meadow - On Bell Plains Road near Buffalo Gap, Texas
- Cedar Hills Lake - Also on Bell Plains Road between FM 89 and US 83/84
- The Canyons - off County Road 127 south of Bell Plains Road
- Callahan Divide - off US 83/84 south of Country Road 149
- Vista Del Sol - Located around the Steamboat Mountain area

== Southeast ==
In commercial development, the southeast area of Abilene, around Loop 322, is likely "ranked third in the city" for development. Currently, all that exists is a family entertainment center, a small local shopping center, a restaurant, and a new gas station. Albeit, that could easily change in near future with the area possibly on the move towards self-sustainability. The area is definitely a leading source of residential development. Several subdivisions have broken ground around the Loop area and along Oldham Lane/FM 1750. As business develops in the area, the southeast region could become analogous to the southwest area, but today the region is only in its initial stages.

=== Commercial ===
Though only a few businesses are in the southeast area outside of Loop 322, the area does show promise for future growth. With housing construction on the rise, the region proves to be a good market for residential necessity businesses such as grocery and home improvement stores or possibly restaurants. Currently, however, there exist a unique collection of various local businesses and very few, if any, chain stores.

- Prime Time Family Entertainment Center - Located on the Loop 322 frontage road, this 15-acre (61,000 m^{2}) family-oriented business has become widely successful, offering a venue unlike that found anywhere else in the city.
- Skyline Oven & Grill - Located in Prime Time Family Entertainment Center
- Lytle Land & Cattle Co - An Abilene culinary staple offering mesquite grilled steaks and seafood.
- The Winery at Willow Creek - Locally owned winery, great for events.
- Lone Star Outpost Retail Center - Small shopping plaza of local businesses given similar architecture to the nearby Lone Star Ranch subdivision
- Copper Creek Restaurant - Upscale restaurant that often hosts live music
- Cisco College - Regional college offering associate degrees and certificates in various fields.
- Texas State Technical College - Abilene Industrial Technology Center, newly constructed in 2018.
- Dodge Jones Youth Sports Center - Funded and planned opening for November 2019.
- Abilene Zoo - One of Abilene's biggest attractions.
- Taylor County Expo Center - Regional grounds for rodeos and the West Texas Fair. Major updates currently underway.
- Shotwell Stadium - Football stadium owned and operated by Abilene ISD with a 15,000 attendant capacity.
- Abilene Country Club

=== Residential Near Loop 322 ===
- Oldham Oaks - Subdivision on the west side of Oldham Lane, north of South 27th Street. Some lots still available.
- Lone Star Ranch - Subdivision off Loop 322 near Prime Time FEC, 87 of 125 lots are currently developed
- Vaquero Ranch - Upscale Spanish-themed and gated community, 16 of 31 lots developed
- Lytle South addition - Addition to Lytle South neighborhood, south of E Industrial Boulevard and east of Oldham Lane
- Tuscany Village - Fenced subdivision of duplexes between Loop 322, Oldham Lane, and E Industrial Boulevard
- Indian Wells - South of Vaquero Ranch, brick-home subdivision off Oldham Lane
- Parkside Place - Largest subdivision in the area in terms of number of houses, houses start in the low $90s

=== Residential Along FM 1750 ===
- Colonial Hills - Begun in 2002, large-lot subdivision at Colony Hill Road and Oldham Lane/FM 1750
- Blackhawk - Newer development similar to Colonial Hills south of the subdivision with large lots and open housing
- Pack Saddle Pass - Also an open-air subdivision with several lots still undeveloped off FM 1750
- Pack Saddle Farms - Very similar to Pack Saddle Pass across the street
- Seven Winds - South of Pack Saddle Pass with more compact housing but large backyards
- Southwind Estates - Larger-home subdivision off Clark Road near the bend in FM 1750

== Northeast ==
Along State Highway 351 outside of I-20 and along the interstate to the west, the northeast region of Abilene technically started development in the mid-1980s when the Heritage Parks subdivision first broke ground. However, after the turn of the 21st century, construction accelerated rapidly for the area to become the second strongest area of development in the city. Since 2005, the Heritage Parks subdivision has expanded; a new community and apartment complex have begun; a Wal-Mart has been attracted to the area, enticing more commercial growth, and a new master-planned commercial district has been created by a major developer, Kenneth Musgrave, who owned, and still owns, much of the land in the area along SH 351.

=== Commercial ===
- The Boardwalk at Allen Ridge - Announced in 2015 by ACU; construction schedule and tenant list unknown. 40-acre mixed-use development across from the Abilene Christian University. Plans include a hotel, shopping, dining and 231 residential units. Planned in conjunction with the development of ACU's Anthony Field at Wildcat Stadium and the university's move to NCAA Division I Athletics. Phase I is estimated to cost $11.1 million. The Abilene City Council will vote to approve a Tax Increment Reinvestment Zone (TIRZ) for the development in February 2019.
- Wal-Mart Supercenter, which replaced the old regular Wal-Mart on N. Judge Ely Blvd.
- Chili's - Located in front of Wal-Mart Supercenter
- Cracker Barrel - At the corner of SH 351 and I-20, ranked No. 1 in the nation for a few weeks after its opening
- Abilene Corners Shopping Center, located next to Wal-Mart Supercenter, includes Dollar Tree and Cato Fashions
- Wal-Mart strip mall, consists of GameStop plus Movies Too, Sally Beauty Supply, Dr. J Express Care, Radio Shack, and others
- Holiday Inn Express - Just behind Comfort Suites, constructed just before the recent explosive commercial growth
- Comfort Suites - Enterprise Dr. and I-20 near across from Lowe's
- A_{2}Z Self Storage - At Union Ln and SH 351 near Heritage Parks
- Sleep Inn - Just off West Lake Rd just south of I-20, currently under construction
- Enterprise Plaza, the master-planned commercial area mentioned above, currently includes Lowe's, with a Residence Inn opened in early 2009 and a Hilton Homewood Suites, Wendy's, and a possible seafood restaurant, as well as other businesses, coming soon
- McGavock Nissan - Relocated car dealership.

=== Residential ===
- Heritage Parks, begun in the mid-1980s, but accelerated expansion in the 2000s
- The Enclave, a fenced community with a single entrance and a branch off Heritage Parks with its own unique housing architecture
- The Residence at Heritage Parks, a new apartment complex off East Lake Rd and currently under construction
- The Grove - Apartments at N Judge Ely Blvd and I-20, aimed at attracting students from the nearby Abilene Christian University
- Napa Cottages - Single-family housing development on EN 10th, east of Judge Ely Blvd. Geared toward ACU students.

== Industrial and Business Parks ==
=== Five Points Business Park ===
An 800-acre industrial park with direct access to Interstate 20, the Union Pacific Railroad and 15 minutes from the Abilene Regional Airport. The park is fully equipped with all major utility infrastructures in place, including water, wastewater, natural gas, electric, and telecommunications. Current tenants include Broadwind Towers, Texas Healthcare Linen, TxDOT, Atmos Energy, Pactiv, Tucker Energy, and Zoltek-Toray. Lots of available space.

=== Access Business Park ===
Announced in 2018 by the Development Corporation of Abilene, Access Business Park is a high-end, upper-business class industrial development located directly south of I-20 and directly across from Abilene Regional Airport (ABI). The park offers excellent infrastructure including electricity, natural gas, telecommunications, water and wastewater. The sole current tenant is an anonymous business known as "Project Ladybug" for whom the DCOA approved a $2.3 million investment.
