= Everhome Suites =

Extended-stay hotel chain

- Industry: Hospitality
- Founded: 2020
- Number of locations: 30 (June 2, 2026)
- Area served: U.S.
- Parent: Choice Hotels
- Website: www.choicehotels.com/everhome-suites

Everhome Suites is an extended-stay hotel brand of Choice Hotels International launched in 2020. Its principal competitors include LivSmart by Hilton Worldwide, Candlewood Suites by IHG, and StudioRes by Marriott International.

== History ==
Choice Hotels officially announced the Everhome Suites brand at the 2020 Americas Lodging Investment Summit (ALIS). It was originally designed to have 114 guest rooms, ranging in size from 658-square-foot suites with one bedroom to 324-square-foot king bed studio suites. The first Everhome Suites was located in Corona, California. The property opened in 2022, and featured 98 apartment-style rooms.

Everhome Suites continued expanding across Southern California throughout 2023. New properties included a 120-room hotel in Temecula, a 113-room hotel in Ontario, and one hotel in San Bernardino with 114 rooms. The first East Coast property, which debuted in 2024, was a 115-room hotel in Newnan, Georgia. It was a dual-property arrangement alongside a WoodSpring Suites, another extended-stay brand owned by Choice Hotels.

The brand increased its presence in the Northeast in 2025, with new locations in Newington, New Hampshire, Rochester, New York, and Somerset, New Jersey. Choice Hotels debuted a redesigned prototype for the brand in February 2026 to add rooms while reducing operational costs.

== Design ==
Everhome Suites operates on a new construction business model, serving demand for extended-stay accommodation near large manufacturing, medical and logistics facilities. Rooms include movable workstations and additional storage, and properties feature a 24-hour self-service convenience store. Consistent with many extended-stay hotels, Everhome Suites is designed to operate with fewer staff.

== See also ==
- List of hotels
- Choice Hotels
