= MainStay Suites =

Extended-stay hotel franchise brand

- Industry: Hospitality
- Founded: 1996
- Number of locations: 142 (as of December 31, 2024)
- Area served: U.S. and Canada
- Parent: Choice Hotels
- Website: www.choicehotels.com/mainstay

MainStay Suites is a midscale, extended-stay hotel franchise. The brand is owned by Choice Hotels International, and operates primarily within the United States. Competing brands include Candlewood Suites by IHG, Premier Suites by Extended Stay America, StudioRes by Marriott International, and LivSmart and LivAway by Hilton Worldwide.

== History ==
In 1995, Choice Hotels announced MainStay Suites, an extended stay hotel with rates of $40–$60 per night. Part of the motivation was a 1995 study by D.K. Shifflet & Associates estimating that extended-stay guests accounted for around 228 million room-nights per year. The brand originally focused on newly constructed properties.

MainStay Suites launched in 1996, with the first location in Plano, Texas. It was the first mid-market extended-stay brand from a major hotel company. In a 1997 letter to shareholders, the company explained that the extended-stay market was fueled by an increase in travelling consultants and specialists following corporate downsizing in the 1980s and 1990s.

In 2015, Choice Hotels introduced a dual-brand hotel prototype, which combined a 38-room Sleep Inn with a 31-room MainStay Suites under one roof. There were 10 dual-branded locations open by 2018, and in 2019 Choice Hotels announced five more Sleep Inn/MainStay Suites properties to be built across California and Arizona. That same year, the firm unveiled a new MainStay Suites logo, alongside new logos for Quality Inn, Clarion, and Sleep Inn.

== Corporate affairs ==
MainStay Suites targets guests looking for long-term accommodation, including business travelers, medical staff and patients, academics, and sports teams. While its strategic footprints are primarily in the U.S., MainStay Suites also holds rights to expand into Canada. Rooms are designed with separate lounge and work areas, and include standard amenities like 24/7 laundry services, exercise facilities, high-speed internet and weekly housekeeping.

The brand's portfolio is evenly split between conversions and new constructions. To accelerate conversions, MainStay Suites uses modular construction design packages, such as "Kitchen-in-a-box" and "Lobby-in-a-box" for kitchens and lobbies respectively.

== See also ==
- List of hotels
- Choice Hotels
