= Comfort Inn and Suites =

American hotel franchise brand

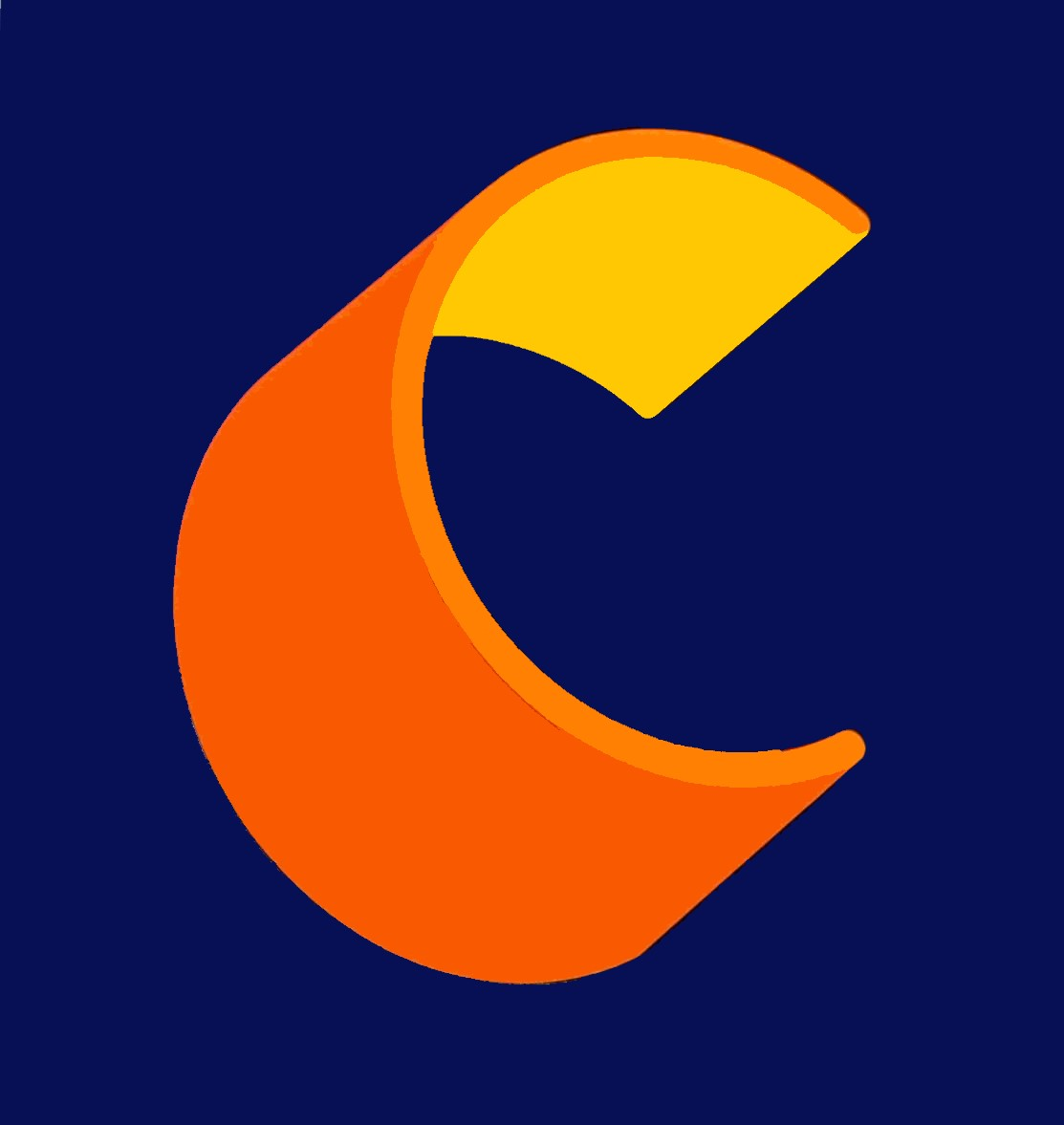
- Type: Subsidiary brand
- Industry: Hospitality
- Founded: 1981; 45 years ago
- Founder: Quality Inns International
- Headquarters: North Bethesda, Maryland, United States
- Number of locations: 2,159 (as of December 31, 2024)
- Area served: Worldwide
- Owner: Choice Hotels
- Website: www.choicehotels.com/comfort-inn/

Comfort is an American hotel brand launched in 1981 by Quality Inns International, which later became the Choice Hotels chain. It is used worldwide by its parent company and experienced significant growth during the 1980s in the United States.

Originally targeted at economy travelers, Comfort was repositioned in the early 2010s as an upper-midscale brand. Choice currently operates three franchise formats under the Comfort logo: Comfort Inns, Comfort Suites, and Comfort Inn & Suites. Its competitors include Marriott's Fairfield Inn & Suites, IHG's Holiday Inn Express, and Hilton's Hampton Inn.

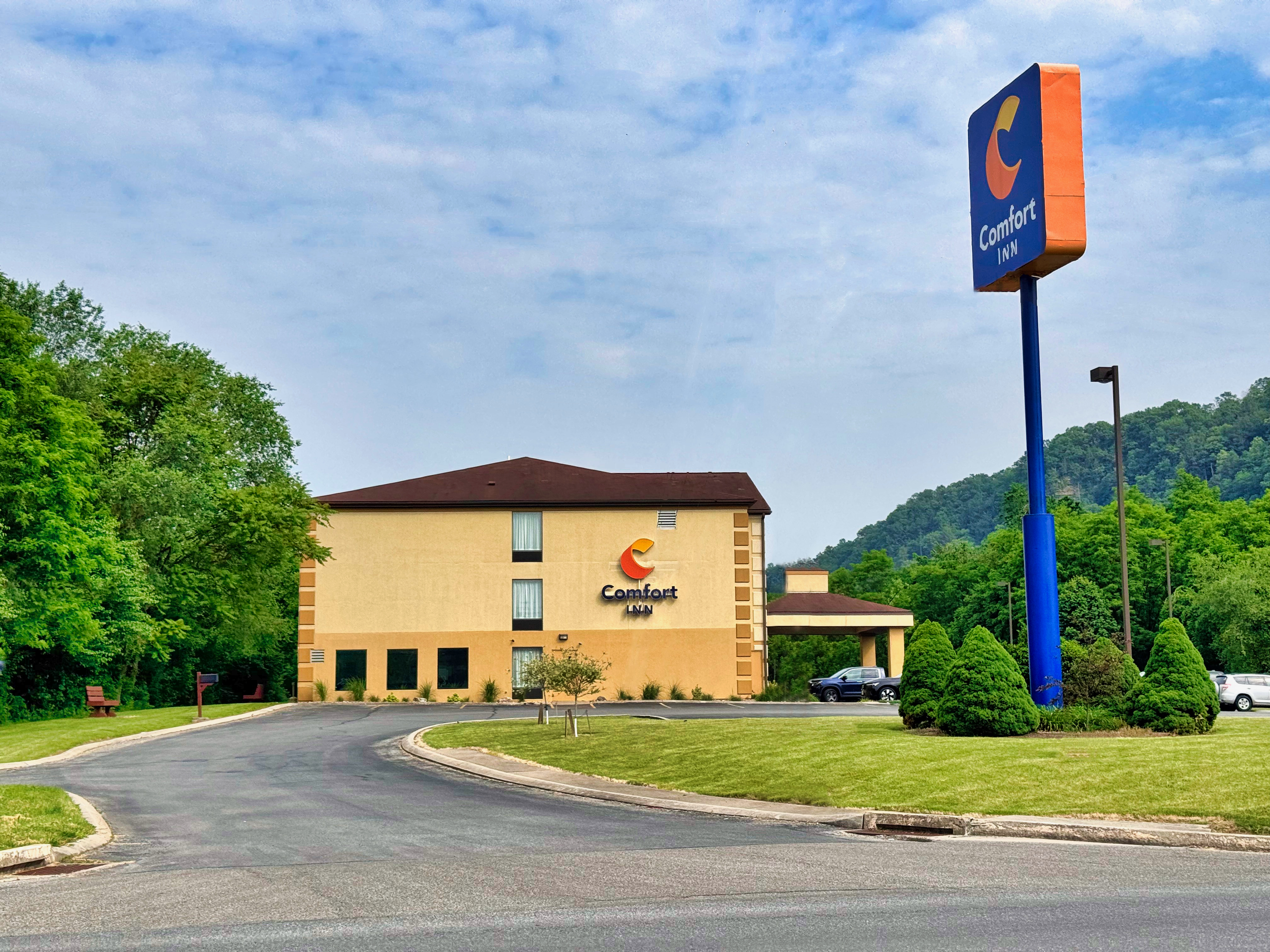
A Comfort Inn and sign in Huntingdon, Pennsylvania

== History ==
=== Foundation and early development ===
Comfort was introduced in 1981 as part of Choice Hotels' early use of market segmentation in the U.S. lodging industry. Comfort developed as an economy brand distinct from the company's Quality Inn, Sleep Inn, and Clarion chains, intended to appeal to cost-conscious travelers within the domestic market. The first property to operate under the Comfort name was a refurbished hotel in Atlanta, formerly known as the "Tech Motel" because of its proximity to Georgia Tech. By the close of the 1980s, the brand had expanded to 860 locations across the 48 contiguous United States.

In the 1990s, Comfort began to expand internationally under CEO Robert Hazard, moving the brand from a largely North-American footprint to include Europe, Asia-Pacific, and Latin America. In the United States, Choice continued to grow the Comfort network amid increasing competition in the wider franchise sector.

In 1998, newly appointed CEO Charles A. Ledsinger, Jr., introduced a multi-year standardization plan across Comfort franchisees to improve customer experience. Ledsinger's tenure saw continued international growth for Comfort, including a growing presence in Europe, the Middle East and Australasia. In 2003, the brand entered New Zealand, converting properties of the Melbourne-based Flag Choice Hotels, of which Choice was a parent.

The onset of the 2008 financial crisis suppressed occupancy rates for franchise owners across the Comfort network. At the same time, it pushed for greater integration of its booking technology and brand standards among its franchisees.

=== Brand refresh ===
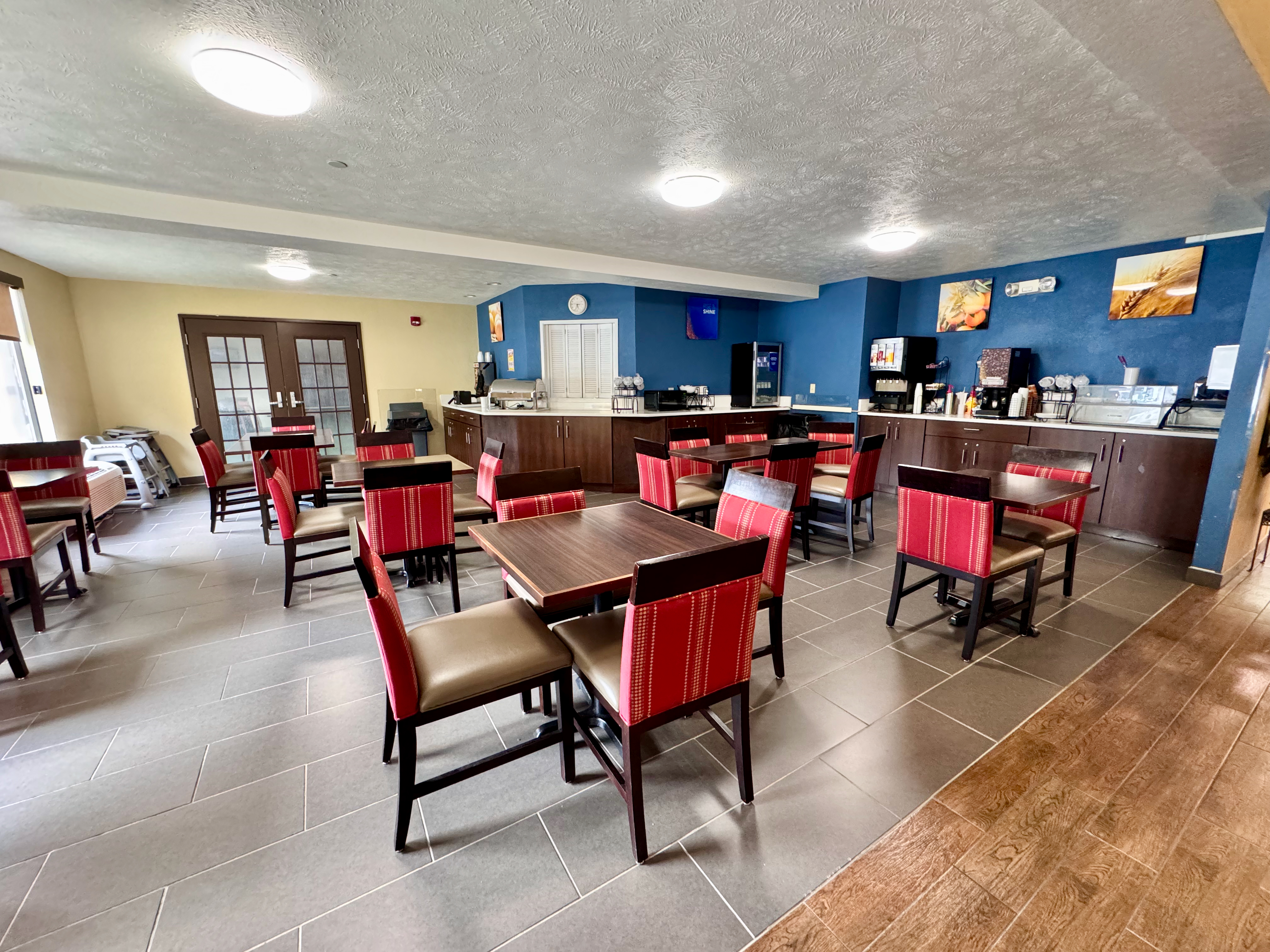
A typical Comfort Inn breakfast area

In 2012, Choice launched a brand refresh for Comfort. As part of a $40 million property improvement incentive program, Choice Hotels removed around 600 underperforming hotels from the Comfort franchise, prompting a 0.6% year-over-year reduction in net room count by the end of 2015.

In 2018, Comfort again refreshed the logos of its midscale brands. As part of the overhaul, Comfort Inn, Comfort Suites, and Comfort Inn & Suites now fell under the same design umbrella.

=== Recent developments and new construction ===
In the 2010s, Comfort placed a focus on new construction. By early 2019, the development pipeline numbered almost 300, of which new constructions accounted for 80%.

In 2021, Choice Hotels introduced a new prototype hotel for Comfort, emphasizing multi-purpose areas. The first location opened in 2023 near the Mark Twain National Forest in Mountain Grove, Missouri. In 2025, an updated version of the prototype was released, incorporating an additional three guest rooms within the same building footprint.

== See also ==
- List of hotels
- Choice Hotels
