= Clarion Hotels =

Midscale hotel franchise with global presence

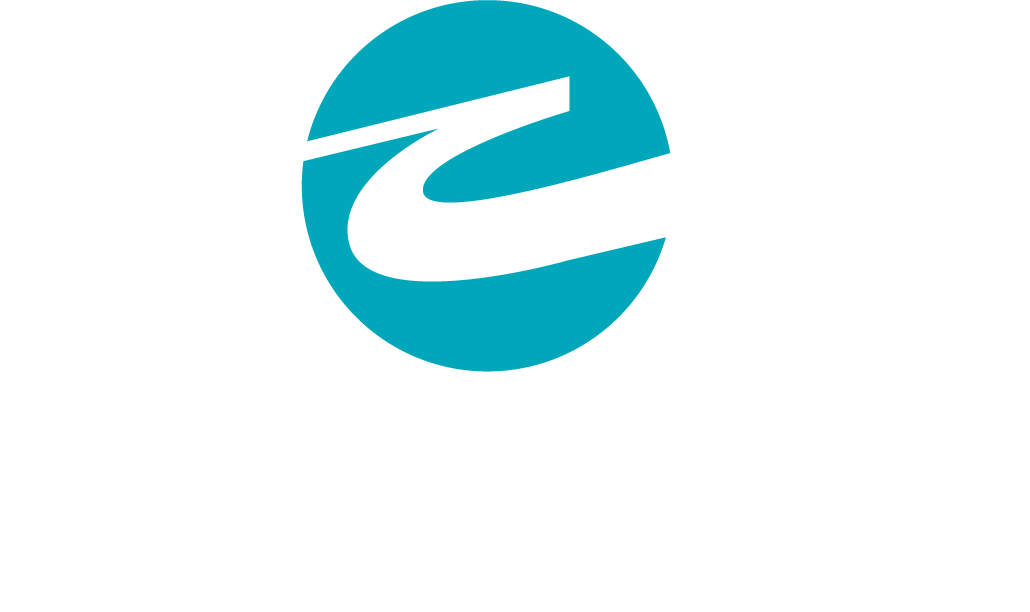

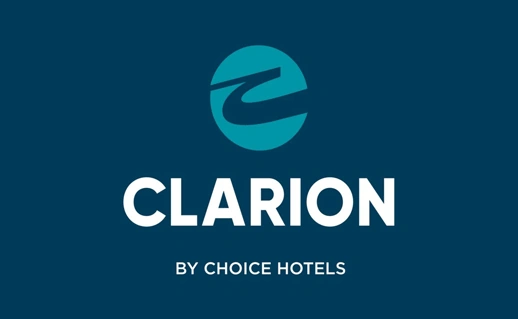
- Industry: Hospitality
- Founded: 1987
- Number of locations: 331 (December 31, 2024)
- Area served: Worldwide
- Owner: Choice Hotels
- Website: https://www.choicehotels.com/clarion

Clarion is an international hotel brand founded in 1987 by Quality Inns International (now Choice Hotels), with a primary presence in the United States and Europe and additional locations in Asia-Pacific and Latin America. Competitor brands include IHG's Holiday Inn and Wyndham Hotels's Ramada.

== History ==
Clarion Hotels and Resorts was launched in 1987 as a joint venture between Quality Inns International and the Associated Inns and Restaurants Company of America (AIRCOA). Properties rebranded as Clarion included AIRCOA locations and those from Quality’s Royale Inns brand. Originally positioned as an upscale brand, Clarion Hotels focused on attracting business travelers.

By 1993, there were 52 Clarion Inns in the U.S. The brand’s first New England location was the full-service Clarion Somerset in Nashua, New Hampshire. Clarion’s introduction to the Asia-Pacific region was in New Zealand, when in late 2003 Choice Hotels announced its plans to convert Flag Hotels properties to Clarion Hotels, Comfort Inns, and Quality Inns. In 2005, the Clarion Hotel Stockholm opened, designed by Swedish architect Gert Wingårdh.

In 2014, Choice Hotels launched the first Clarion locations in China, in partnership with the Boli Hotel Management Company. In 2016, Choice Hotels opened three Clarion Hotels in Turkey: Golden Horn, Istanbul Mahmutbey, and Kahramanmaraş. Clarion Hotel The Hub debuted in 2019 in Oslo, Norway.

In 2024, Choice Hotels signed a deal with Zenitude Hôtel Résidences, a French hotel operator, to convert 33 Zenitude hotels to Choice brands. Locations converted to the Clarion brand included a 460-room hotel near Charles de Gaulle Airport, and a 110-room hotel in Toulouse.

== Corporate Affairs ==
As a franchise operation, Clarion is targeted at owners of existing hotels looking to simplify operations while continuing to offer core amenities like restaurants, meeting rooms, and fitness facilities. In Europe and Asia-Pacific, some locations are managed as full‑service hotels with on‑site restaurants, conference facilities, fitness centers, and in some cases, saunas and rooftop pools. Sub‑brands include Clarion Hotels, Clarion Resorts, Clarion Suites, and the select‑service Clarion Pointe.

Clarion Pointe was launched in 2018 as a brand extension aimed at the midscale select-service segment, competing against the likes of Best Western and Wyndham Hotel's Wingate. The first Clarion Pointe hotel was a 72-room hotel in Sulphur Springs, Texas. In 2019, Choice Hotels introduced a new Clarion logo.

== See also ==
- List of hotels
- Choice Hotels
