= Indian Lakes Hotel =

Resort hotel in Bloomingdale, Illinois

- Former names: Hilton Chicago Indian Lakes Resort, Indian Lakes Country Club
- Alternative names: Indian Lakes Hotel, Indian Lakes Resort, Prairie Lakes Resort

General information
- Status: Vacant
- Type: Hotel and Resort
- Architectural style: Brutalist and Modernism
- Location: Bloomingdale, Illinois, 250 W Schick Rd
- Coordinates: 41°57′07.6″N 88°05′54.8″W
- Groundbreaking: 1979; 47 years ago
- Completed: 1980; 46 years ago
- Opened: June 2, 1980 (as the Indian Lakes Resort), Early 2024 (as the Prairie Lakes Resort)
- Renovated: 2023/24
- Closed: March 2021 (as the Indian Lakes Hotel)
- Owner: Village of Bloomingdale

Height
- Height: estimated 73 ft.

Technical details
- Floor count: 7
- Floor area: 206,250 sq ft.
- Lifts/elevators: 4 elevators installed by Westinghouse Electric Corporation, 1 installed by Automatic Elevator Company (2 elevators installed by Otis Elevator Company were demolished)
- Grounds: 14.7 acres

Design and construction
- Architect: Don Erickson
- Developer: Carson International (subsidiary of Carson Pirie Scott & Co)
- Awards: Illinois' Best Golf Hotel 2015
- Known for: The Indian Lakes Hotel is known for its Frank Lloyd Wright inspired architecture. Don Erickson was an apprentice of Frank Lloyd Wright.

Other information
- Number of rooms: 305
- Number of suites: 23
- Number of restaurants: 1
- Number of bars: 1
- Facilities: Indoor and Outdoor Pool, Golf Course, Bar, Conference Rooms, Banquet Hall, Spa, and a Game Room
- Parking: Less than 90

The Indian Lakes Hotel is a resort located in Bloomingdale, Illinois. It opened in 1980 as Bloomingdale's only resort hotel. The hotel closed in 2021 due to a shooting incident which revoked the hotel's license. The Indian Lakes property is currently under renovation to be reopened.

== History ==
The Indian Lakes Resort originally was a country club which was named the Indian Lakes Country Club which opened in 1965. In 1971, Carson Pirie Scott purchased the property to build a 6–7 story hotel. The original golf course buildings were renovated to fit the needs of the hotel. During construction, a waterfront building was built on the north end of the hotel, the waterfront building was designated to be used for weddings, events, and birthday parties.

The hotel had their grand opening on June 2, 1980. The hotel featured over 300 rooms including 23 suites, a custom bar, a pool and spa, a restaurant, conference rooms, and a large golf course.

In 2003, renovations were in place to modernize the golf course.

In the late 2000s, Hilton bought the property and renamed the hotel into the Hilton Chicago Indian Lakes Resort. During Hilton's ownership, there were major renovations done to the hotel, but nothing done to ruin the famous architecture. In 2016, Hilton closed the golf course permanently.

In 2019, Hilton sold the hotel to a private owner which made the hotel independently owned.

== Frank Lloyd Wright inspired architecture ==
Don Erickson was the main architect for the Indian Lakes Hotel. He was an apprentice for the architect Frank Lloyd Wright. Don utilized Frank's work into the design and construction of the hotel. Frank was known to fuse Brutalist and Modernism architectural styles into his buildings. Erickson was also known to use the same architectural styles into his work. The building was built to look almost like a pyramid but has some geometric elements to it. Concrete was used to build the hotel. The interior of the hotel has concrete pillars with wooden accents on them. The pool and conference room areas utilizes Douglas-Fir wood ceilings and pillars throughout which contributes to the prairie-style architecture used by Frank Lloyd Wright.

== Elevators ==
The developer of Indian Lakes contracted Westinghouse Electric Corporation to install four geared traction elevators that serve the guest floors, with two elevators in the front of the building and two in the back. The interior of the elevator cars was furnished with laminate wood walls, glass windows, and carpet floors. The floors were changed out at some point with cobblestone style flooring. Each car has a relay controller that dispatches the elevator to a certain floor. In the 2010s, guests complained about the ride quality being too scary or unsafe. The elevators broke down often, but they were easy to fix and put back into service.

The developer of Indian Lakes also contracted Automatic Elevator Company to install a hydraulic elevator that went from the basement to street level at the waterfront building. In the late 2000s, the elevator received a modernization by Long Elevator Company to replace the car buttons and to replace necessary parts for code compliance.

== The Indian Lakes mass shooting incident ==
On February 6, 2021, rapper BCR Meezle (aka James McGill, 27) was shot and killed inside the hotel during a party. Six other victims were injured from gunshots, those victims survived. Police say the shooting followed a huge hotel party in which two groups rented a few rooms at Indian Lakes, then invited nearly 200 people. The party spanned two floors. Detectives believe the group was there to film a rap video.

There were no security personnel present in the hotel during the incident, just the one employee who heard the gunshots and called 911. Police also said this is not the first time they have been called out to the Indian Lakes Hotel, and slapped it with a violation.

The incident led to the hotel having its license revoked, preventing the hotel from operating.

== Closure ==
In March 2021, the Indian Lakes Hotel owners announced they will be permanently closing the hotel with no chance of reopening. The incident from a month prior had something to do with it.

== Partial demolition ==
In 2020, some of the buildings on the Indian Lakes Hotel property were demolished to make room for redevelopment opportunities. The main hotel and waterfront building survived demolition.

== Major renovation ==
On September 25, 2023, the Daily Herald announced that the Indian Lakes Hotel property was purchased by Maverick Hotels for renovation. The hotel will reopen under the Ascend Hotel Collection Prairie Lakes Resort name. People are excited for the revival of the Indian Lakes Hotel however the horrors from 2021 still haunt nearby residents. The property was purchased originally in 2022 by PlattPointe Capital for $3,800,000.
