= Suburban Studios =

Hotel brand run by Choice Hotels

- Company type: Subsidiary
- Industry: Hospitality Industry
- Founded: 1987; 39 years ago
- Headquarters: United States
- Number of locations: 111 (March 31, 2025)
- Area served: United States
- Products: Extended stay hotel accommodation
- Owner: Choice Hotels
- Website: www.choicehotels.com/suburban

Suburban Studios is an American extended stay hotel franchise that operates across the United States. Originally named "Suburban Lodge", the franchise was renamed "Suburban Extended Stay" upon its purchase by Choice Hotels, before adopting its current name in 2022.

Principal competitors include Extended Stay America, Marriott's InTown Suites, Best Western's SureStay Studios, and OYO Rooms's Studio 6.

== History ==
In 1987, the Atlanta-based Suburban Lodges of America opened its first location, a 126-room hotel in Forest Park, Georgia, not far from Hartsfield-Jackson Atlanta International Airport. The company franchised both Suburban Lodge and Suburban Lodge Extra.

In May 2002, InTown Suites purchased Suburban Lodges of America. In the acquisition, InTown Suites acquired the 65 company-owned hotels, 62 franchised properties, and the 73-hotel Guesthouse International Hotel franchise. InTown Suites spun off the Suburban Extended Stay and Guesthouse International Hotel franchises shortly afterwards, retaining only the hotels previously owned by Suburban Lodges of America. After the spinoff, the owners of the 62 franchised Suburban Lodge locations bought the franchise arm, forming Suburban Franchise Systems.

In 2005, Choice Hotels acquired Suburban Franchise Systems, the parent of what was by then known as Suburban Extended Stay Hotels, for US $10 million.

== Corporate Affairs ==
In 2022, Choice rebranded Suburban Extended Stay Hotels as “Suburban Studios.” The rebrand involved a new logo and room design. The first location to transition to Suburban Studios was in Chicago. The brand utilizes modular design packages for kitchens and lobbies. Each room has a kitchen, and the chain offers 24/7 laundry, high-speed internet, and bi-weekly housekeeping.

In 2023, Suburban Studios franchised its 100th hotel in Bloomington, Minnesota. By the end of 2024, the chain had 111 locations in the U.S. and a new Suburban Studios was the 500th franchised extended stay location of Choice Hotels.

== See also ==
- List of hotels
- Choice Hotels
