= Broadway (Nashville, Tennessee) =

Entertainment district and major thoroughfare

- Broadway Historic District
- U.S. National Register of Historic Places
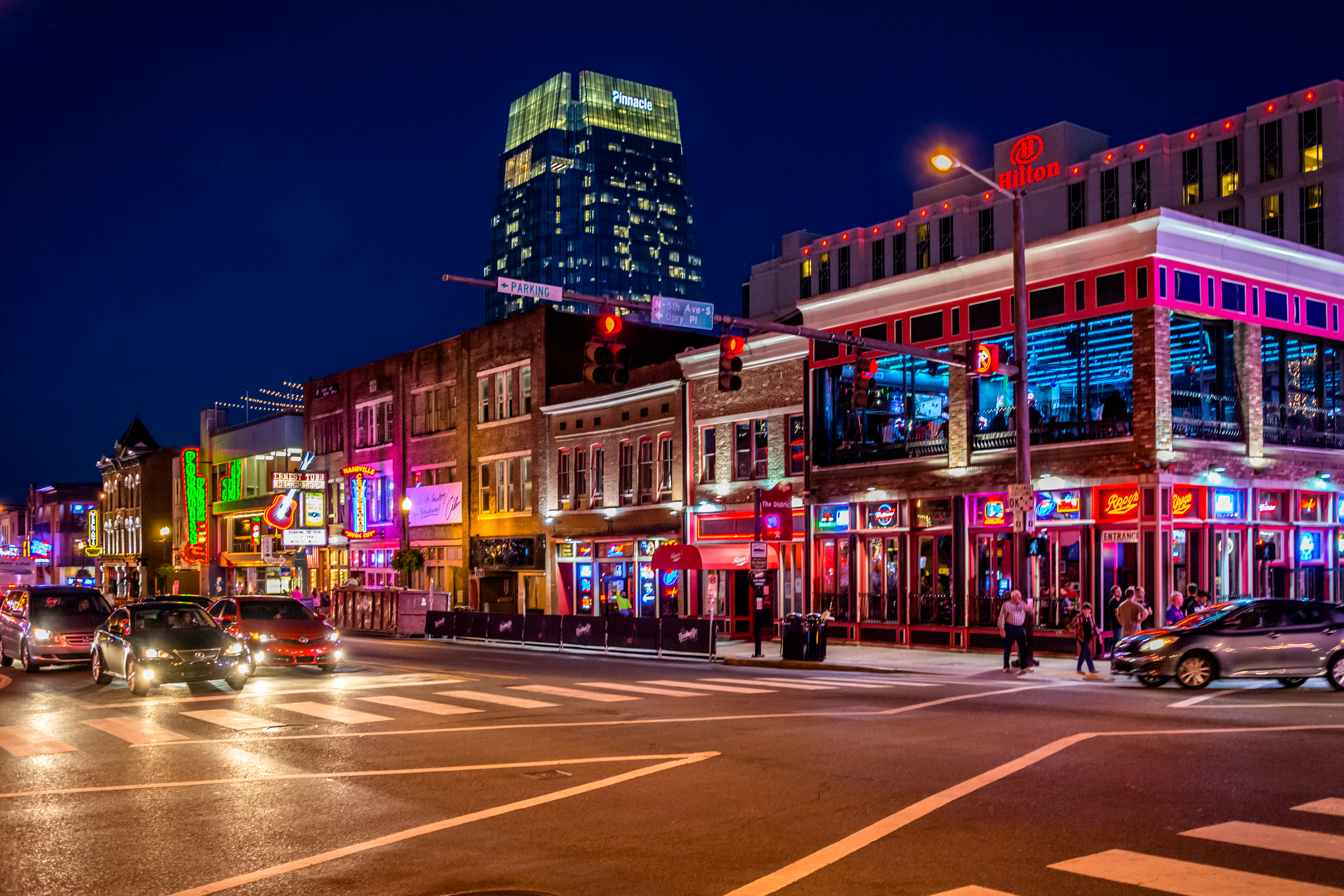
- Broadway

- Location within Tennessee Location within the United States
- Location: Nashville, Tennessee between 2nd Ave and 5th Ave
- Coordinates: 36.161111°N 86.776389°W
- Built: 1880
- Architect: Multiple
- Website: honkytonkrow.com
- NRHP reference No.: 80003785
- Added to NRHP: July 18, 1980

Broadway is a major thoroughfare in the downtown area in Nashville, Tennessee. It includes Lower Broadway, a tourist and entertainment district renowned for honky tonks and live country music. The Broadway Historic District or Honky Tonk Highway was listed on the National Register of Historic Places listings in Davidson County, Tennessee (NRHP) on July 18, 1980.

The street is also home to retail shops, restaurants, dessert spots, tourist attractions, and hotels.

== History ==
Originally named Broad Street, the eastern end of Broadway ended at the shipping docks on the Cumberland River. It was one of the first roads to run east–west in Nashville, and the first public high school in the city was built on the road in 1875. It eventually became a commercial center lined with hardware stores, feed stores, and various other businesses and had a section known as "Auto Row" at the beginning of the 20th century due to large numbers of car dealers and tire and auto shops. A new post office – now the Frist Art Museum – was built next to Union Station on Broadway by the Works Progress Administration (WPA) during the Great Depression.

Jimmie Rodgers started performing in bars along Broadway near the river in the 1930s. His success eventually attracted other performers, and a thriving music scene developed on Lower Broadway – the section of Broadway that runs from 1st Avenue to 5th Avenue. The popularity of Broadway declined for a time after the Grand Ole Opry left Ryman Auditorium in 1974, but the area came back to life when the Opry moved some shows back to the Ryman in the 1990s.

Today, the historical buildings are home to retail shops and restaurants in addition to honky tonks. The official Nashville Convention & Visitors Corporation page defines a honky tonk as "an establishment that contains at least one rockin' stage, cold beverages, and a party that lasts all day, every day." Live music plays in most bars and restaurants along Lower Broadway from as early as 10 a.m. to 3 a.m. or even later each day, which is how the street came to be known as "Honky Tonk Highway". The venues don't have cover charges, and established music artists sometimes make appearances to perform with the up-and-comers. Many famous stars have gotten their starts in these venues, including Dierks Bentley, Gretchen Wilson, Willie Nelson, Johnny Cash, Blake Shelton, and Kris Kristofferson.

Broadway divides downtown Nashville into North of Broadway and South of Broadway (SoBro).

=== Landmarks ===
The entire Lower Broad district (2nd Avenue and 5th Avenue) was added to the National Register of Historic Places in 1980. Additionally, several locations farther down Broadway are registered historical landmarks.

- Union Station Hotel: Listed on the National Register of Historic Places in 1969, Union Station started out as a train station in the 19th century. The lobby contains stained glass that is more than 100 years old and 65-foot vaulted ceilings. Along with late Victorian Romanesque Revival architecture, the hotel's Art Deco interior is decorated with original art that honors the city's music history.
- Frist Art Museum: In addition to hosting national and international shows, the Frist displays the works of local and regional artists. Located in a Grecian Moderne-style marble building that previously housed a historic U.S. post office, the museum was added to the National Register of Historic Places in 1984.
- Hume-Fogg High School: The two towers of this historical building feature Norman-Gothic style architecture. The overall look resembles a medieval European castle, making the four-story building a common spot for photos. The school was added to the National Register of Historic Places in 1974.
- Federal Office Building (Customs House): Designed by William Potter in a Gothic Revival architectural style, this building was added to the National Register of Historic Places in 1972.
- Christ Church Cathedral: With Gothic architecture designed by Francis Hatch Kimball, this church became an official historical landmark in 1978. It is still in use as a place of worship.

== Location ==
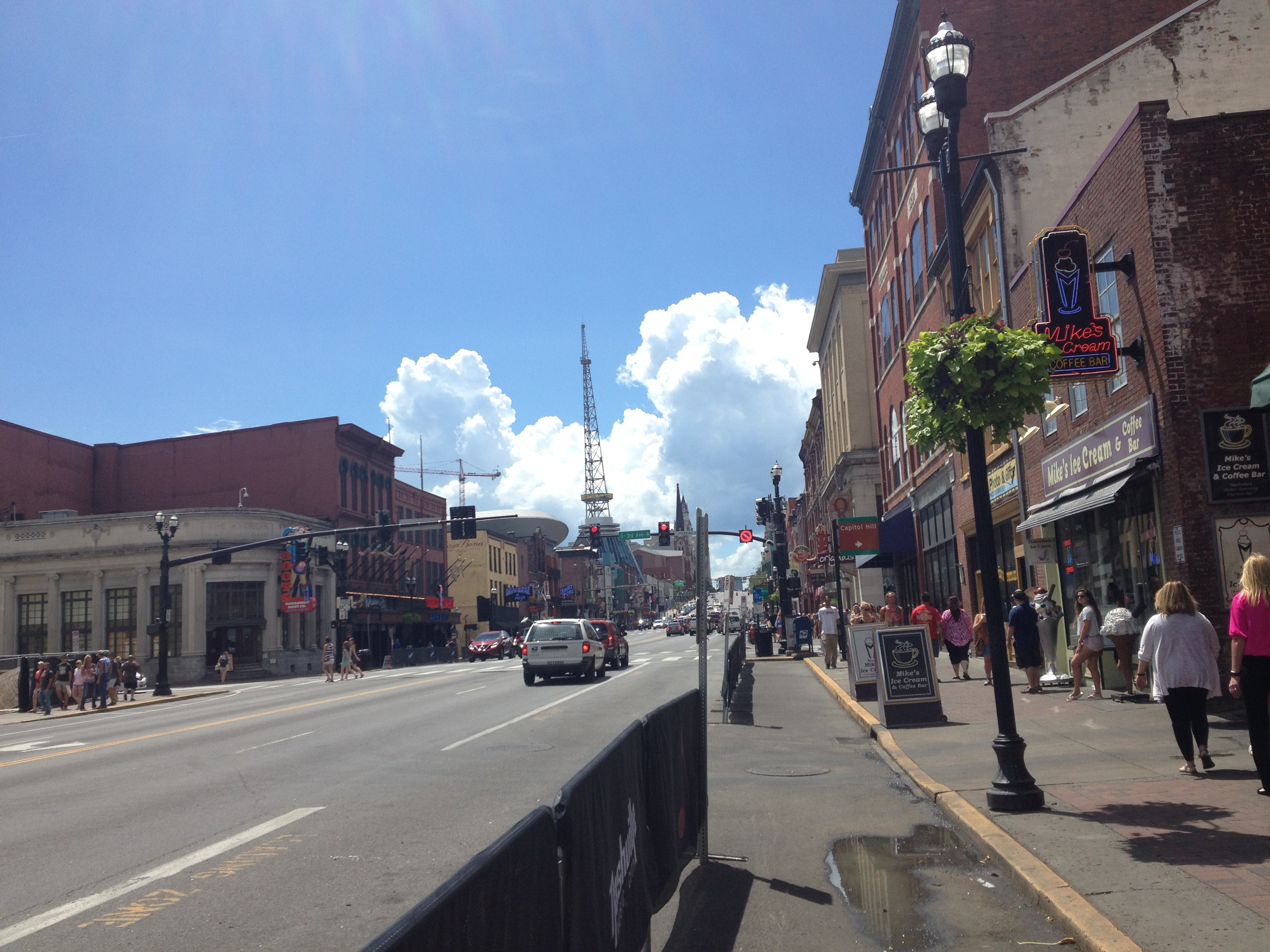
Broadway westbound approaching 3rd Avenue

The street starts at the convergence of 1st Avenue North and 1st Avenue South near the Cumberland River and runs southwest all the way to the campus of Vanderbilt University, where it takes a sharp southward turn and merges with 21st Avenue South.

It is bisected by the following streets/intersections:

- 1st Avenue North/South
- 2nd Avenue North/South
- 3rd Avenue North/South
- 4th Avenue North/South
- Rep. John Lewis Way North/South
- 7th Avenue North/South
- Rosa L. Parks Boulevard/8th Avenue South
- 11th Avenue North/South
- 12th Avenue North/South
- George L. Davis Boulevard/13th Avenue South
- 14th Avenue North/South
- 16th Avenue North/South
- 17th Avenue South
- 19th Avenue South
- Lyle Avenue

Concurrent Interstates 40 and 65 run beneath Broadway between 13th and 14th Avenues and are accessible via adjacent ramps on George L. Davis Boulevard and 14th Avenue South. Broadway is accessible from the Interstates at Exit 209A (I-40 W/I-65 N) and 209B (I-40 E/I-65 S).

From 1st Avenue to 16th Avenue, Broadway serves as the "dividing line" between the north and south designations of the avenues. From 1st Avenue to 13th Avenue, Broadway serves as U.S. Route 70. From 8th Avenue to its merger with 21st Avenue South, Broadway serves as U.S. Route 431.

== Transportation ==
Broadway functions as a traditional street with both vehicle and bicycle traffic. Various shuttles, buses, and taxis operate in the area. The WeGo Star commuter train also stops at Riverfront station near the end of Broadway by the river.

== Entertainment and restaurants ==
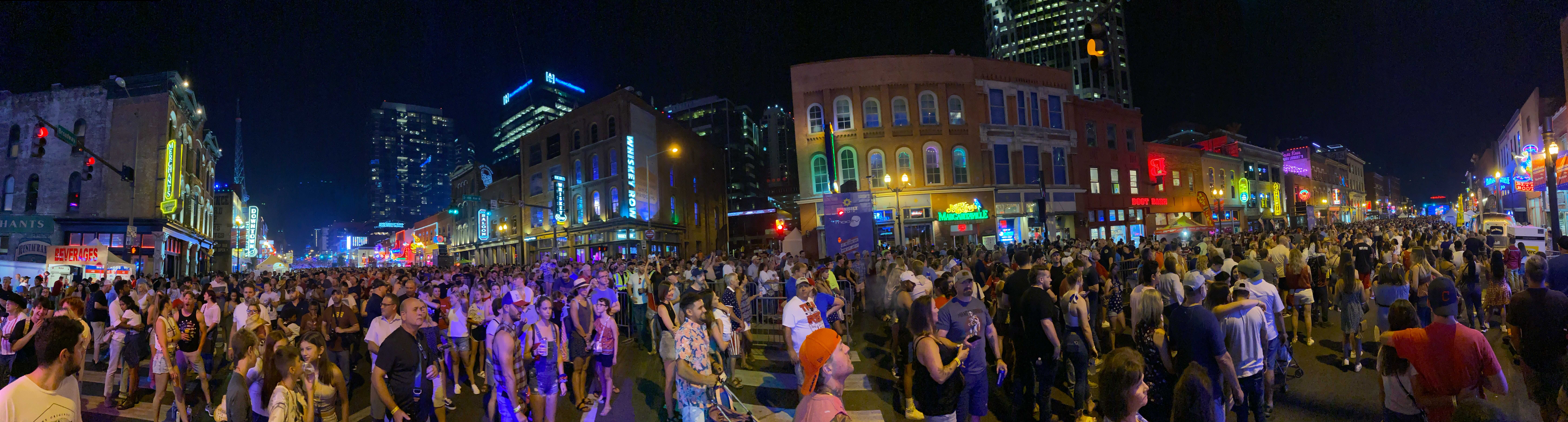
Panoramic picture of Broadway on July 4

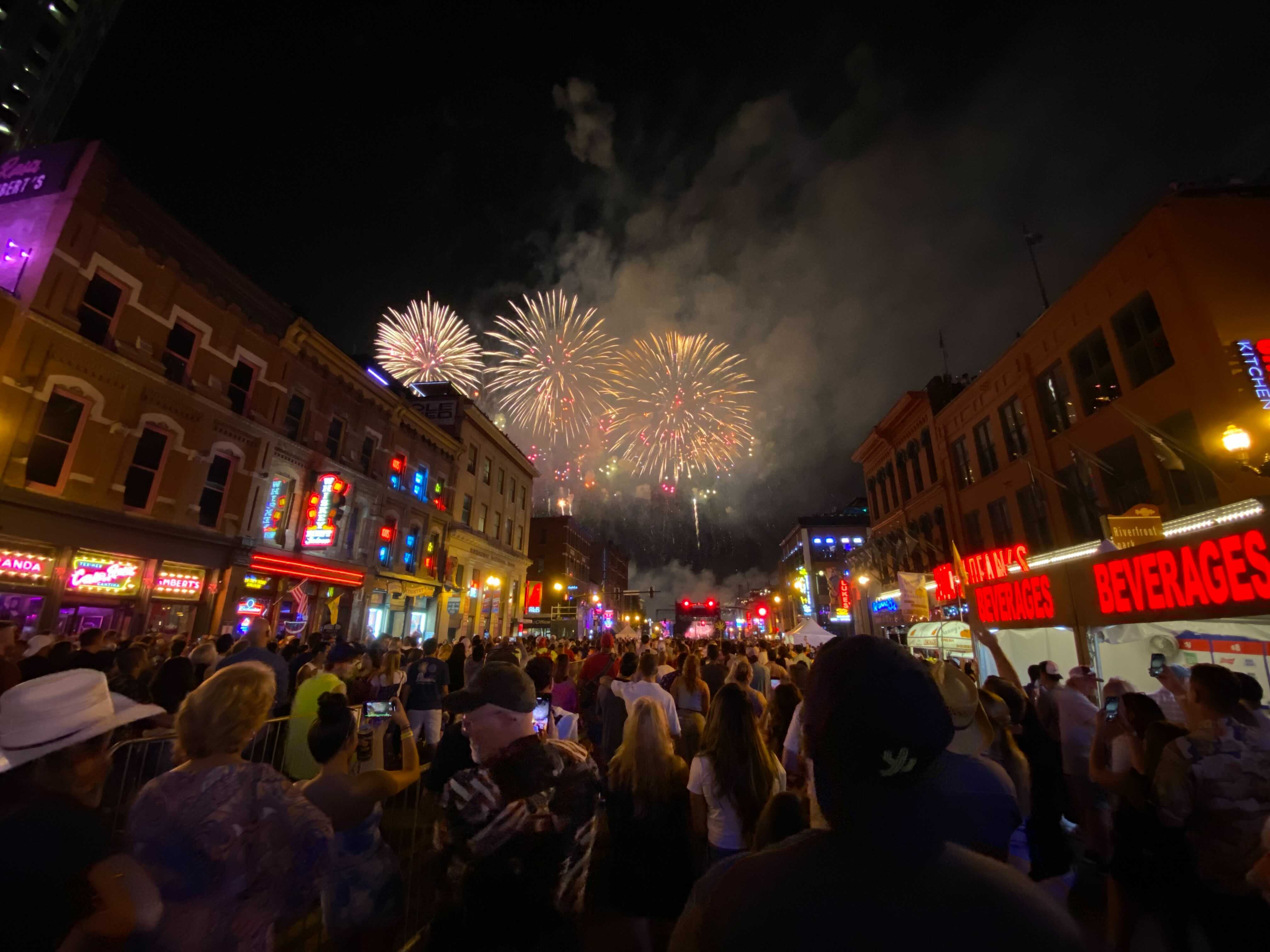
Fireworks show on Broadway on July 4

Hard Rock Café: Positioned at the edge of Riverfront Park, the Nashville Hard Rock has live bands playing in the Reverb Room. The area known as the Ledge provides a view of the Cumberland River and downtown.

Acme Feed & Seed: Located in a 100-year-old building that formerly sold grain, this venue is now a very large (22,000 square feet), multi-level restaurant and live music spot. The rooftop bar has a view of the Cumberland River, Nissan Stadium, and the Broadway strip. Dining options include a sushi bar on the second floor and street-style local classics in the main dining area.

Nashville Underground: This 40,000-square-foot honky tonk located near the end of Broadway close to the Cumberland River has four floors with bars, food, live music, and a mechanical bull The full menu includes southern dishes, bar foods, and specialty items.

Ole Red: Owned by Blake Shelton as part of a collaboration with the Grand Ole Opry, this honky tonk has a rooftop with a view of Broadway to go with multiple floors of entertainment and a full menu.

Jason Aldean's Kitchen + Rooftop Bar: Country star Jason Aldean created the menu of southern-style dishes himself for his honky tonk. The rooftop bar is the largest on Broadway, and a gift shop sells themed memorabilia.

== Hotels ==
Construction is set to be completed on the new Marriott Moxy Hotel on the second block of Lower Broadway by the end of 2018. Currently, the hotel options on Broadway are located farther down the street, away from the Lower Broadway area.

- Holiday Inn Express – Downtown
- Union Station Hotel
- Hilton Garden Inn – Vanderbilt
- Embassy Suites – Vanderbilt
- Cambria – Downtown
- Cambria – Midtown
- Kimpton Aertson Hotel

== Shopping ==
The Lower Broadway area has various souvenir and specialty – many western-themed – shops along both sides of the road. Additionally, some of the bars and attractions have their own gift shops, such as Legend's Gift Shop inside Legend's Corner.

Ernest Tubb Record Shop: Founded in 1947 by Ernest Tubb, the "Texas Troubadour", this historic shop is the broadcast site of the Midnight Jamboree on WSM 650 AM. Autographed photos line the walls, and records, sheet music, and memorabilia line the shelves.

Savannah's Candy Kitchen of Nashville: This sweet shop makes and serves everything from chocolate candies to homemade ice cream and candy apples.

Lower Broadway has several boot stores within a few blocks, including:

- Boot Barn
- Boot Country
- Betty Boots
- Big Time Boots
- Broadway Boot Company

== Tourist attractions ==
In addition to locations for listening to live music and dining, Broadway has other sites that attract both locals and tourists.

Bridgestone Arena: This arena seats almost 20,000 people and is home to the Nashville Predators, the Nashville Visitors Center, and the Tennessee Sports Hall of Fame. It hosts everything from concerts and the CMA Awards to sports events, like those of the Nashville Predators.

Riverfront Station and Riverfront Park: The site of big celebrations like fireworks for Independence Day, this park on the bank of the Cumberland River has trails, a dog park, and an amphitheater for live music performances. The adjoining train station is the western endpoint of the WeGo Star rail system for commuters.

=== Nearby attractions ===
Some of the city's most popular attractions are located very near Lower Broadway on some of the cross streets:

- 1st Avenue: Fort Nashborough, Ascend Amphitheater
- 3rd Avenue: Johnny Cash Museum, Patsy Cline Museum
- 4th Avenue: Nashville Symphony, Music City Walk of Fame, Nashville Music Garden
- 5th Avenue: Country Music Hall of Fame, Hatch Show Print, Ryman Auditorium, Music City Center
- 6th Avenue: The Hermitage Hotel, Tennessee Performing Arts Center, War Memorial Auditorium & Military Branch Museum
- Charlotte Avenue: Tennessee State Capitol (between 6th and 7th Avenues)
