= Ascend Collection =

Upscale hotel soft brand owned by Choice Hotels

- Industry: Hospitality
- Founded: 2008
- Area served: Worldwide
- Parent: Choice Hotels International
- Website: www.choicehotels.com/ascend

The Ascend Collection is a brand launched by Choice Hotels International in 2008 for higher-priced historic and boutique hotels. Competing brands include Best Western’s Signature and Premier Collections, Wyndham’s Trademark Collection, and IHG’s Voco Collection.

== History ==
The Ascend Hotel Collection was launched during the recession of 2008. It was an early example of "soft branding" in the hotel industry. While the meaning of "soft brand" varies, a simple definition by Robert Rauch is "a hotel that is backed by a leading brand whose name does not appear on the building". Soft branded hotels may sometimes be newly constructed properties, but they typically already have an established presence.

Ascend Collection properties are independently operated, leading to wide variation in theme and design. Early Ascend Collection locations included the Golden Hotel in Golden, Colorado, the Kress Inn in De Pere, Wisconsin, and Hotel Bothwell in Sedalia, Missouri. While primarily a group of pre-existing boutique hotels that signed onto the Ascend brand, Choice Hotels undertook some new construction initiatives in the mid-2010s, signing contracts in 2014 for 11 newly built Ascend Collection hotels.

In 2016, the brand announced a three-year expansion in Europe, adding up to 10 properties in the U.K., and 80 across the mainland. This built upon the brand's existing portfolio of 20+ hotels outside the U.S., which included six locations in Sweden, two each in Ireland and Norway, and one in Denmark.

== Corporate affairs ==
The Ascend Collection is widely considered to be the hotel industry's first soft brand. By the end of 2024, the Ascend Collection had more than 400 locations across the Americas, Europe, Middle-East, and the Asia-Pacific region, with over half of its properties in the U.S. A new logo for the Ascend Collection brand was introduced in 2025.

== See also ==
- List of hotels
- Choice Hotels
