= Choice Hotels =

American hospitality company

Choice Hotels International, Inc.
- Type: Public
- Traded as: NYSE: CHH; S&P 400 component Russell 1000 component
- Industry: Hospitality; Franchising
- Founded: 1939; 87 years ago
- Founder: Stewart W. Bainum Sr.
- Headquarters: North Bethesda, Maryland, U.S.
- Number of locations: ▲7,586 (Dec. 31, 2024)
- Area served: Worldwide
- Key people: Pat Pacious, president & CEO; Stewart W. Bainum Jr., Chairman
- Brands: Ascend Hotel Collection; Cambria Hotels; Clarion; Clarion Pointe; Comfort Inn; Country Inn & Suites; Econo Lodge; Everhome Suites; MainStay Suites; Park Inn; Park Plaza Hotels & Resorts; Quality Inn; Radisson Blu; Radisson Collection; Radisson Hotels; Radisson Individuals; Radisson Inn & Suites; Radisson Red; Rodeway Inn; Sleep Inn; Suburban Studios; WoodSpring Suites
- Revenue: ▲US$1.58 billion (2024)
- Operating income: ▲US$463.77 million (2024)
- Net income: ▲US$299.67 million (2024)
- Number of employees: 1,700 (2024)
- Website: www.choicehotels.com

Choice Hotels International, Inc. is an American multinational hospitality company based in North Bethesda, Maryland. The company, which is one of the largest hotel chains in the world, owns various hotel brands ranging from upscale to economy. As of the end of 2024, Choice Hotels franchised nearly 7,600 hotels, representing over 650,000 rooms, in 46 countries and territories.

== History ==
Logo used until 2015

=== Founding and early years ===
Quality Courts United, Inc. was founded in 1939 as a nonprofit referral chain of seven motels in Florida. The organization limited itself to locations east of the Mississippi River. By the early 1960s, Quality Courts United had approximately 600 members. All members were required to meet certain quality standards and offer amenities like air conditioning, telephones, swimming pools, paved driveways, and wall-to-wall carpeting. In 1963, the organization became a for-profit corporation and changed its name to Quality Courts Motels, Inc.

In 1957, Stewart W. Bainum Sr., who ran a Washington, D.C., plumbing business, opened his first hotel on New Hampshire Avenue in Silver Spring, Maryland (currently, the hotel is located in Takoma Park, Maryland proper). He later franchised his first Quality Courts motel in 1963. In 1968, Bainum merged his business, Park Consolidated Motels, Inc., with Quality Courts Motels, subsequently assuming the role of president and CEO, and moved the company's headquarters from Daytona Beach to Silver Spring, Maryland.

Lodging Magazine wrote that, by 1969, Quality Courts Motels was the world's "largest association of independent motel operators". The company changed its name to Quality Inns International in 1972.

=== Growth and expansion ===
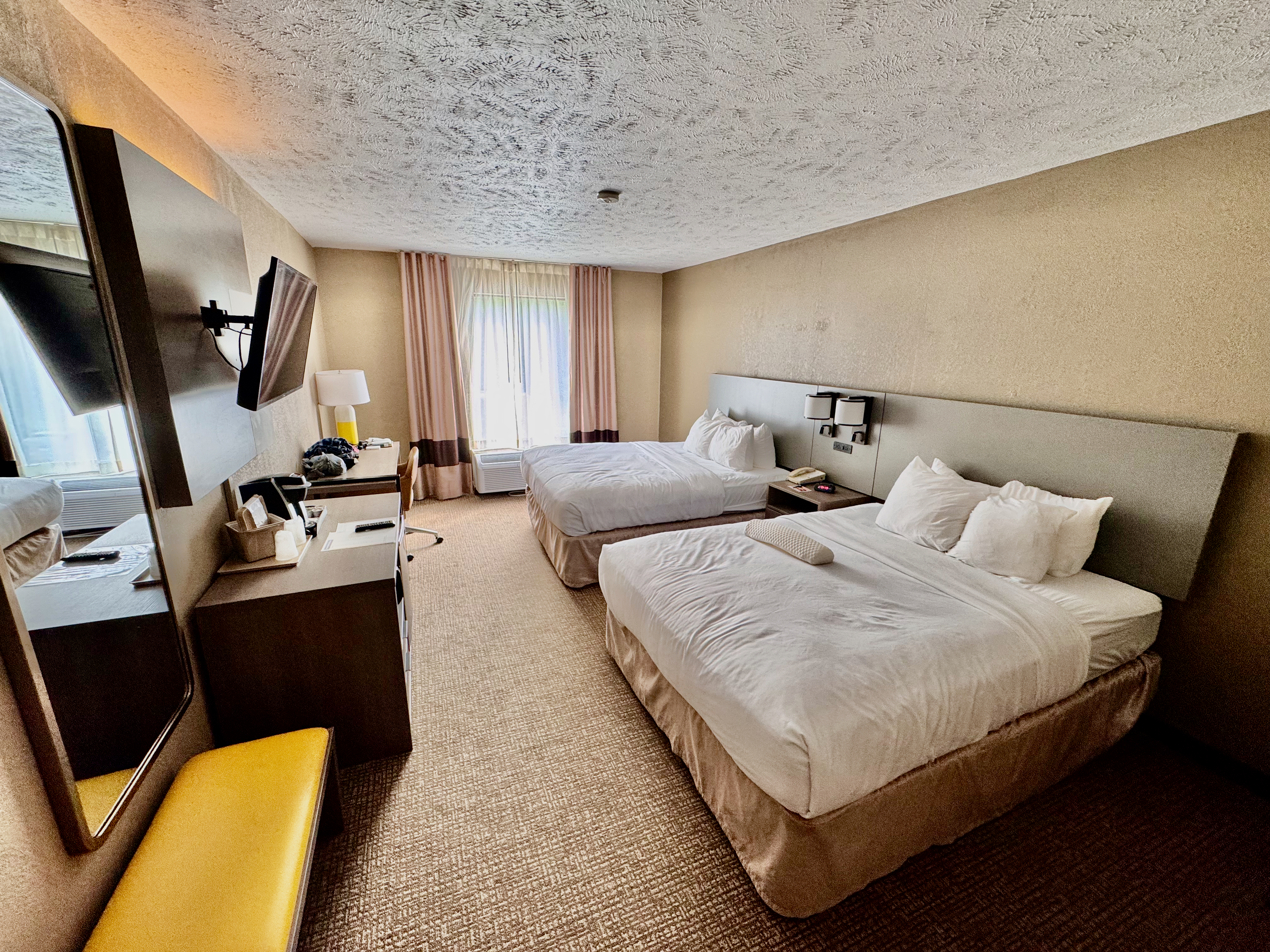
A typical Comfort Inn guest room

In 1981, Quality Inns announced a major nationwide expansion program, and started the industry's first market segmentation strategy, using a range of hotel brands across price points. Geographically, it expanded across the country by opening hotels in the Western United States for the first time. In addition to its Quality Inn hotels, the company created Comfort Inn, a lower-price, limited-service chain, and Quality Royale, representing the most upscale locations in the system. The first Comfort Inn opened in July 1981 in Atlanta, Georgia, converted from a decades-old independent motel next to the Georgia Tech campus. The first hotel to become a Quality Royale franchise was the Georgetown Marbury House in Washington, D.C., in January 1982. Comfort Inn, which would later become Choice Hotels' flagship brand, was marketed to family vacationers, business travelers, and senior citizens, and was intended to compete with Days Inn, Best Western, and Friendship Inn. The company's Quality Inn hotels remained in the midscale segment, competing with Holiday Inn, Ramada, Howard Johnson, and Travelodge. The Quality Royale brand was positioned to compete with Marriott, Hyatt, Hilton, and Sheraton.

In January 1987, Quality Inns established a partnership with Associated Inns and Restaurants Company of America (AIRCOA Holdings), a Denver-based firm that was one of the largest independent hotel management companies in the United States. Quality Inns agreed to merge its upscale Quality Royale brand with AIRCOA's Clarion Collection, which had originally been established in 1983 as a referral chain. The Clarion brand thus replaced Quality Royale as one of Quality Inns' three franchise offerings.

In September 1987, the company announced plans for a lower-price chain with smaller rooms called McSleep Inn, intended to compete with chains like Motel 6. Rather than converting existing hotels to the brand, McSleep Inn locations would be purpose-built to keep costs to a minimum. In announcing the new chain, the CEO of Quality Inns stated that "obviously the name is a takeoff on McDonald's", sparking a legal battle over whether McSleep Inn was infringing on the McDonald's trademark. McDonald's won the ensuing court case in September 1988, forcing Quality Inns to change the name of the chain, whose first locations were then under construction, to Sleep Inn. Additionally, Microtel Inn and Suites founder Loren Ansley claimed that Quality Inns stole his business model, which he had presented to Quality executives before deciding to start his own chain. The first Sleep Inn location opened in Salisbury, North Carolina, on May 15, 1989.

Bainum Sr. led Quality Inns until 1987, when his son, Stewart W. Bainum Jr., took over the role of chairman and chief executive. Bainum's other business, Manor Care, Inc., which owned and managed nursing homes, bought Quality Inns in 1990. In July of that year, the company acquired the Rodeway Inn chain from Prime Motor Inns, making Quality Inns the largest hotel franchisor in the world. In August, Quality Inns bought Econo Lodge of America, owners of the Econo Lodge and Friendship Inns chains. Shortly thereafter, the company's name was changed to Choice Hotels.

Choice Hotels created a joint venture with Canadian motel chain Journey's End in 1993, turning that company's properties into "Comfort Inn by Journey's End" and "Quality Inn by Journey's End". The "by Journey's End" branding was later dropped.

Manor Care spun off its hotels business in 1996, and Choice Hotels became a publicly traded company, holding an initial public offering in 1997. The new company was exclusively responsible for franchising and did not own any of its hotel locations; all hotels formerly owned by Manor Care were split off under a separate company, Sunburst Hospitality Corporation, which became the largest franchisee of Choice Hotels brands. In 1996, Choice Hotels introduced its first extended-stay hotel brand, MainStay Suites, which was advertised as the first mid-price extended-stay chain. The first MainStay Suites location opened in Plano, Texas in November 1996. In 1997, the Friendship Inn brand was eliminated, with its locations being converted to the Rodeway brand.

In July 1998, Choice Hotels created a partnership with Flag International Ltd., the largest hotel chain in Australia, allowing Flag to use the Clarion, Quality, and Comfort brands. The brands quickly outstripped the Flag Hotel chain in popularity in Australia, and Choice Hotels acquired Flag International outright in 2003. The last remaining Flag Hotels were converted to other Choice brands in 2008.

In January 2005, the company announced the creation of its new Cambria Suites brand. The Cambria brand was created as an upscale, limited-service hotel chain marketed to business travelers. The first Cambria Suites location opened near Boise Airport in Boise, Idaho in April 2007.

In September 2005, Choice Hotels acquired the Atlanta-based Suburban Franchise Holding Company, giving the company the franchise rights to the Suburban Extended Stay Hotel brand. The chain was originally founded as Suburban Lodges of America in 1987. The company-owned Suburban Lodges were purchased by InTown Suites in 2002, while the franchise locations became Suburban Extended Stay Hotels. In 2022, the chain was rebranded as Suburban Studios.

In 2008, Choice Hotels was the first industry chain to establish a "soft brand", Ascend Hotel Collection. The Ascend Hotel Collection includes upscale boutique and historic hotels whose owners are subject to fewer fixed brand standards compared with Choice's other brands.

=== Recent history (2012–2023) ===
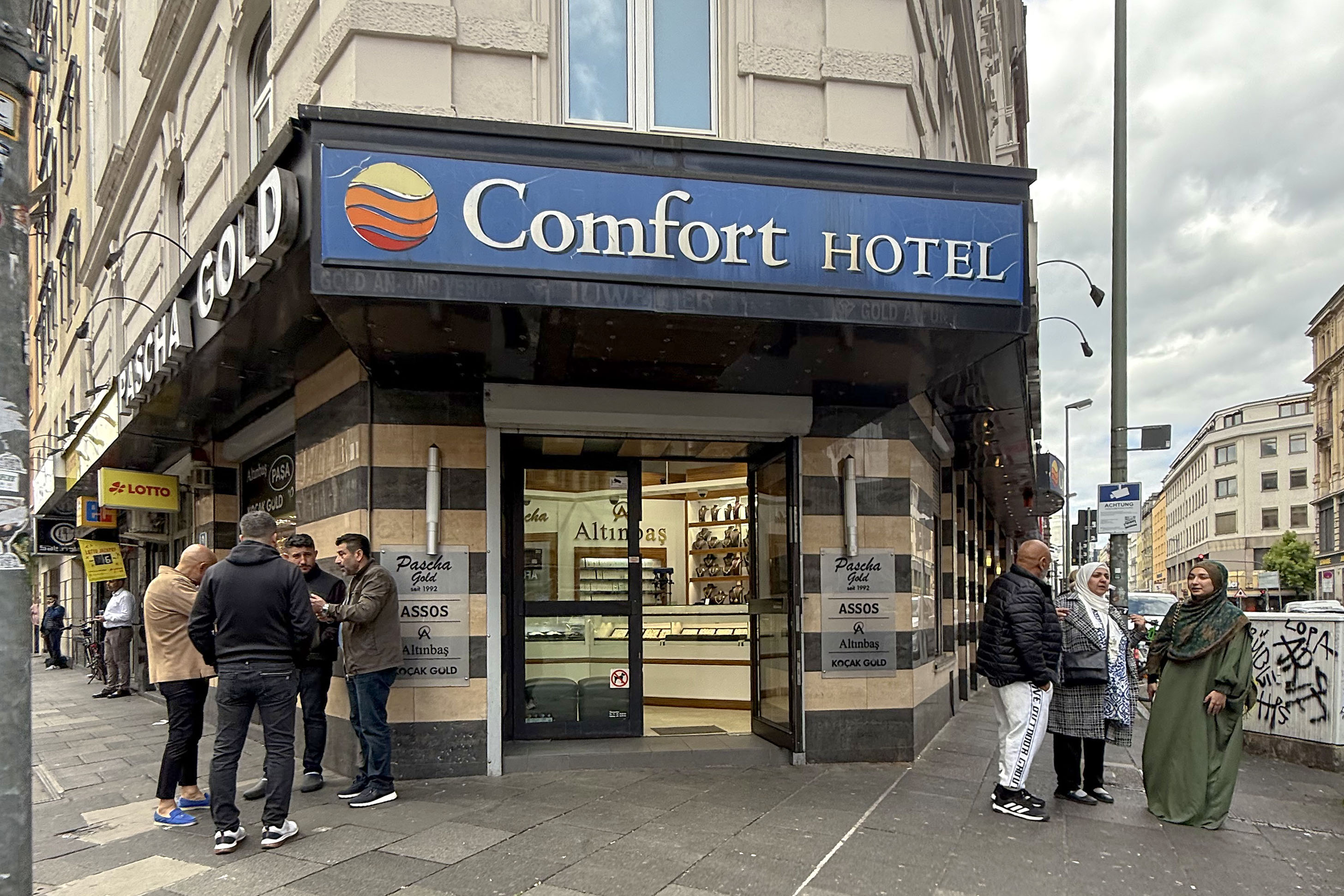
Comfort Hotel in Frankfurt, Germany

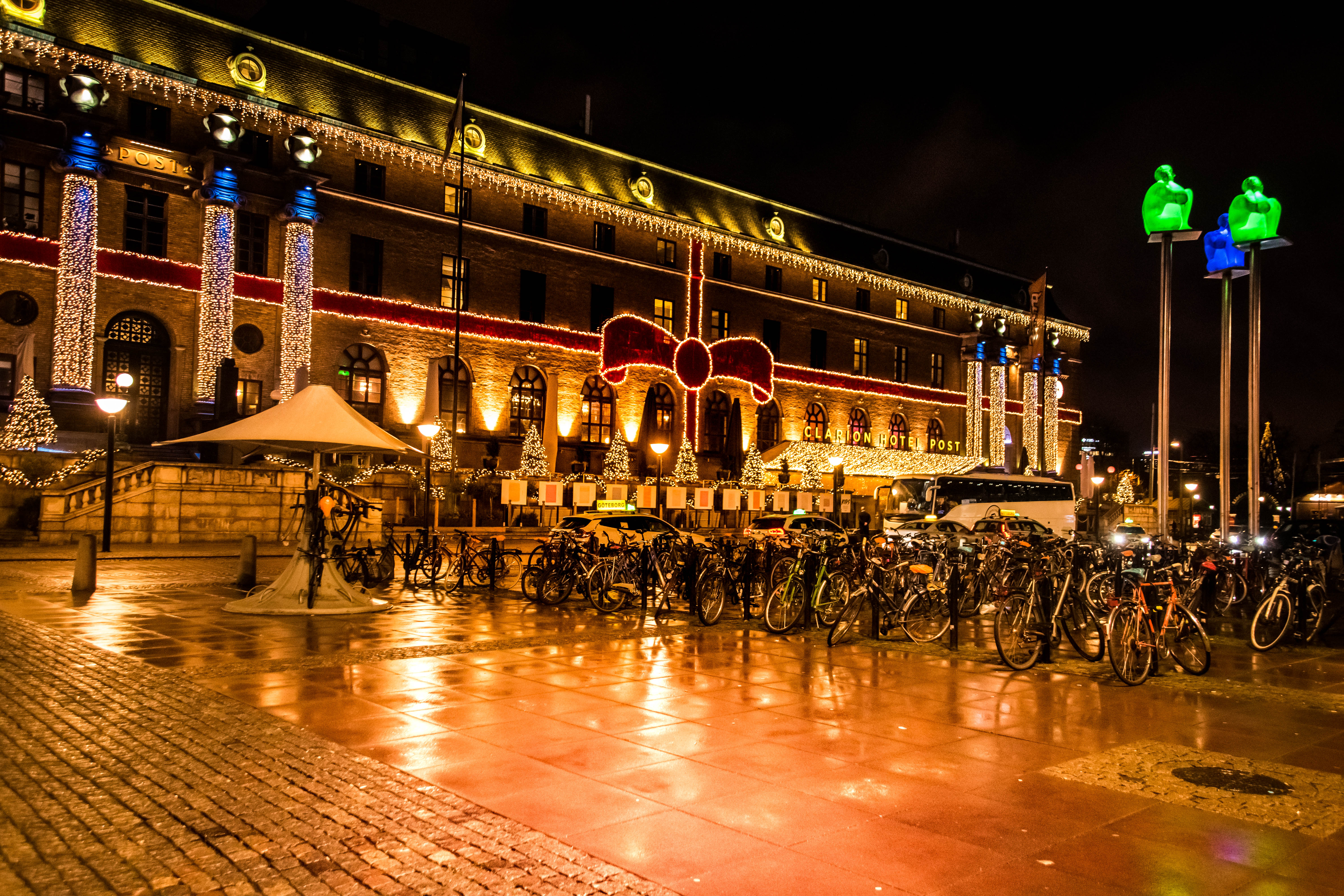
Clarion Hotel in Gothenburg, Sweden

Choice Hotels began a transformation of its Comfort properties in 2012, with the company removing its franchising from 600 properties that did not meet Choice Hotels’ new standards. Choice Hotels rebranded Comfort in 2018, which brought its Comfort Inn, Comfort Inn & Suites, and Comfort Suites brands under one umbrella. Some of the Comfort properties that didn't meet Choice's standards for the brand were rebranded under the Quality Inn brand, as Comfort and Quality swapped market positions within Choice's hierarchy.

In October 2010, officials in Maryland and Montgomery County announced that Choice Hotels International would move its headquarters from Silver Spring, to a new 197,866 square feet (18,382.4 m^{2}) facility in Rockville Town Center in Rockville. Groundbreaking occurred in August 2011, and Choice Hotels completed the move into the new headquarters in June 2013.

Throughout its history, Choice Hotels introduced new features into the hotel industry, including having all hotels include non-smoking rooms, 24-hour-a-day toll-free reservations, Internet-based property management systems, and the industry's first iPhone application. The company's technological developments also led it to create a division called SkyTouch Technology in 2013, which markets Choice Hotels' property management system to other hotel companies.

In 2014, Choice Hotels invested millions of dollars to begin a multi-year process to develop the industry's first new global reservations system and distribution platform in 27 years. A cloud-based system, choiceEDGE, launched in 2018. The system can integrate with voice search and artificial intelligence.

In 2018, Choice Hotels acquired WoodSpring Suites, an extended-stay economy hotel brand. Adding WoodSpring's 240 hotels across the U.S. tripled the number of extended-stay hotels in the company's portfolio to around 350 properties.

As of 2018, Choice Hotels-branded properties are located in more than 40 countries and territories, including hotels in Europe, Asia-Pacific, the Middle East, and Scandinavia. Choice Hotels entered into an agreement with Spanish hotel operator Sercotel in 2018 to increase Choice's footprint in Spain and Latin America.

In September 2018, Choice Hotels announced Clarion Pointe, an extension of the Clarion brand for locations with limited service. The first Clarion Pointe hotel opened on May 1, 2019, in Sulphur Springs, Texas, converted from a former Holiday Inn Express.

Choice Hotels announced the creation of a new brand of midscale extended stay hotels, Everhome Suites, in January 2020. The first Everhome Suites location opened on September 29, 2022, in Riverside, California, after delays due to the COVID-19 pandemic.

On June 13, 2022, Choice Hotels agreed to purchase Radisson Hotels Americas for $675 million from Jin Jiang International Holdings Co, acquiring the Radisson franchise agreements, operations and intellectual property in the United States, Canada, Latin America and the Caribbean.

In October 2023, Choice Hotels announced a proposal to purchase all outstanding shares of Wyndham Hotels & Resorts for $90 per share. That offer came after Wyndham declined a direct acquisition bid from Choice.

== Corporate affairs ==
Choice Hotels International is publicly traded on the New York Stock Exchange under the stock symbol CHH. It maintains a corporate headquarters in North Bethesda, Maryland, and a technology campus in Phoenix, Arizona. At year-end 2017, Choice Hotels employed 1,987 people in its global corporate operations. Stewart W. Bainum Jr. is chairman of Choice Hotels' board of directors, a position he has held since 1987. Pat Pacious became president and CEO in September 2017, replacing Steve Joyce. Previously, he served as Choice Hotels' president and chief operating officer. In 2023, the company moved their headquarters from Rockville, Maryland to the Pike and Rose neighborhood of North Bethesda, Maryland.

=== Partnerships ===
Choice Hotels formed an alliance with Bluegreen Vacations, an international timeshare company, in 2013. Pursuant to this arrangement, many Bluegreen resorts are members of Choice Hotels' Ascend Hotel Collection brand.

In 2021, Choice Hotels and Penn National Gaming entered into a strategic partnership to allow guests to book one of many Penn properties directly through Choice.

=== Loyalty program ===
Choice Hotels' rewards program is called Choice Privileges. In order to earn points through the program, one must book a reservation by either calling a toll-free number, going online, or using their mobile app. Points are updated the day after the user's stay. To redeem points earned using the program, one must log in on Choice Hotels' website. Points can be redeemed for gift cards or airline mileage. Additionally, there is the option to redeem points through the use of their Co-Branded Credit Card which launched with Mastercard and Wells Fargo in February, 2023.

=== Animal welfare ===
In 2018, Choice Hotels committed to source 100% cage-free eggs by 2025. In 2025, animal activists criticized Choice Hotels for failing to meet this commitment. According to Choice Hotels 2025 sustainability report, 52% of its managed hotels and 50% of its franchises in the US were using cage-free eggs. As of 2026, the company website still stated the 2025 commitment.

== Brands ==
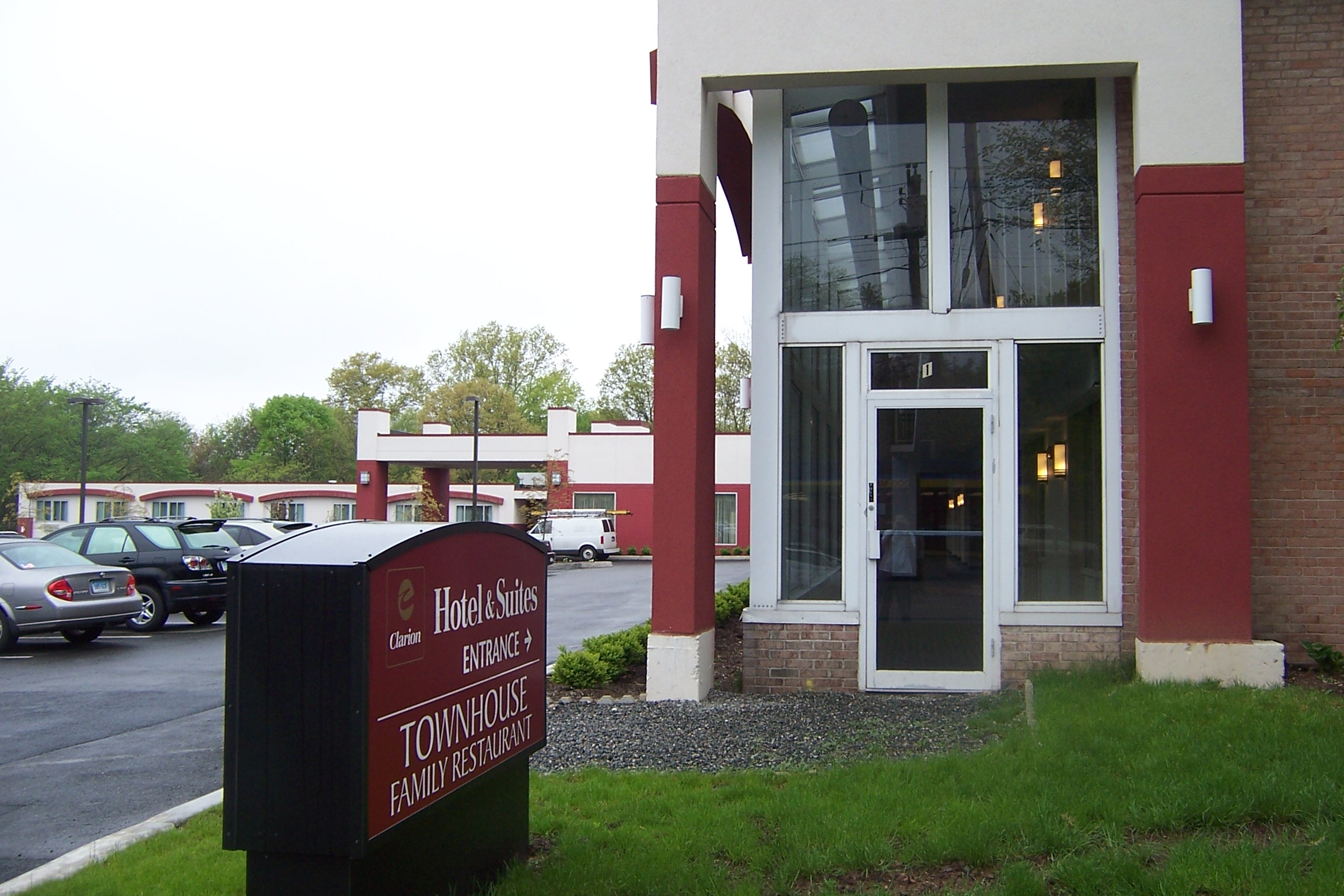
A Clarion hotel in Hamden, Connecticut

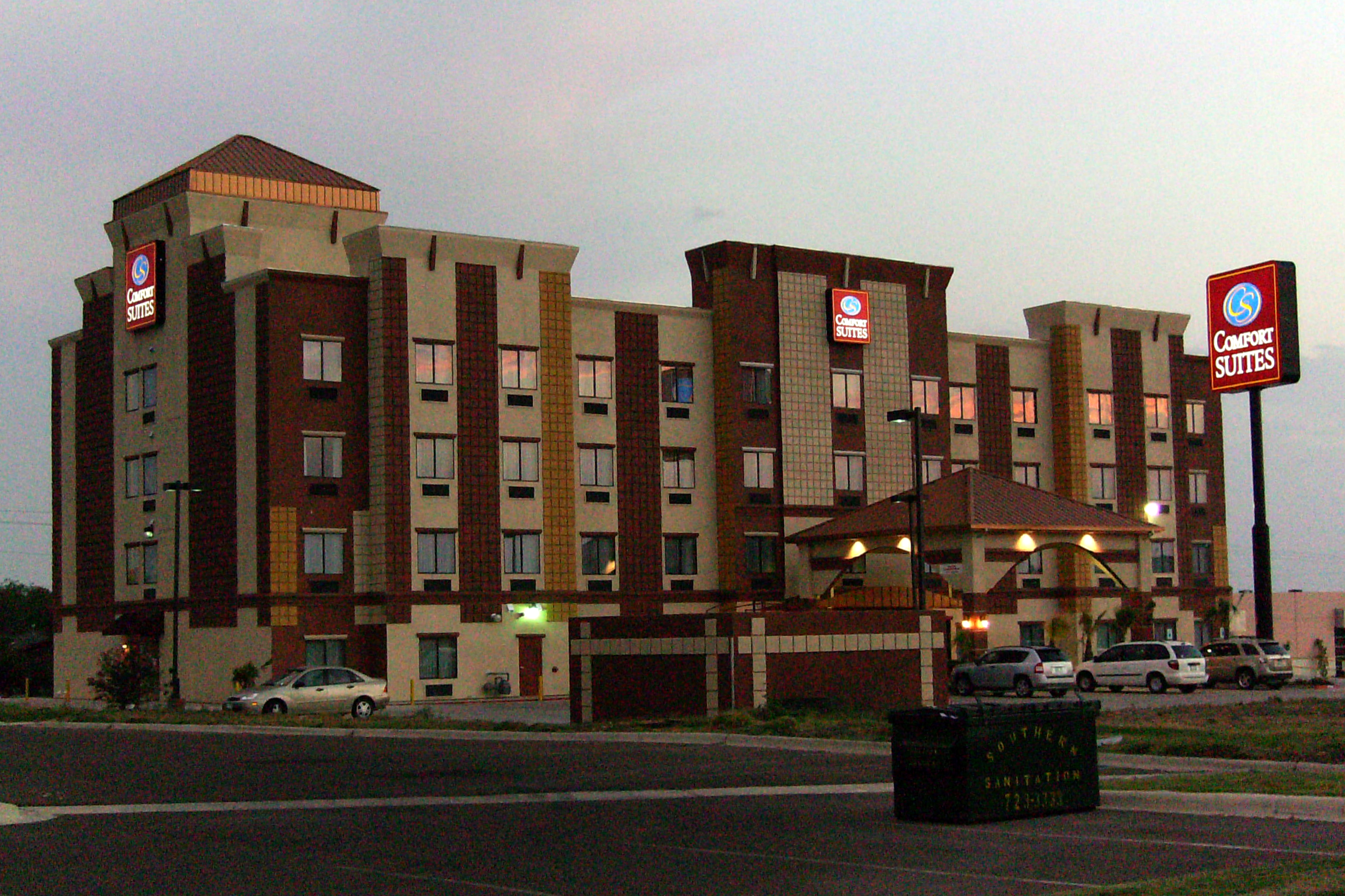
A Comfort Suites in Laredo, Texas

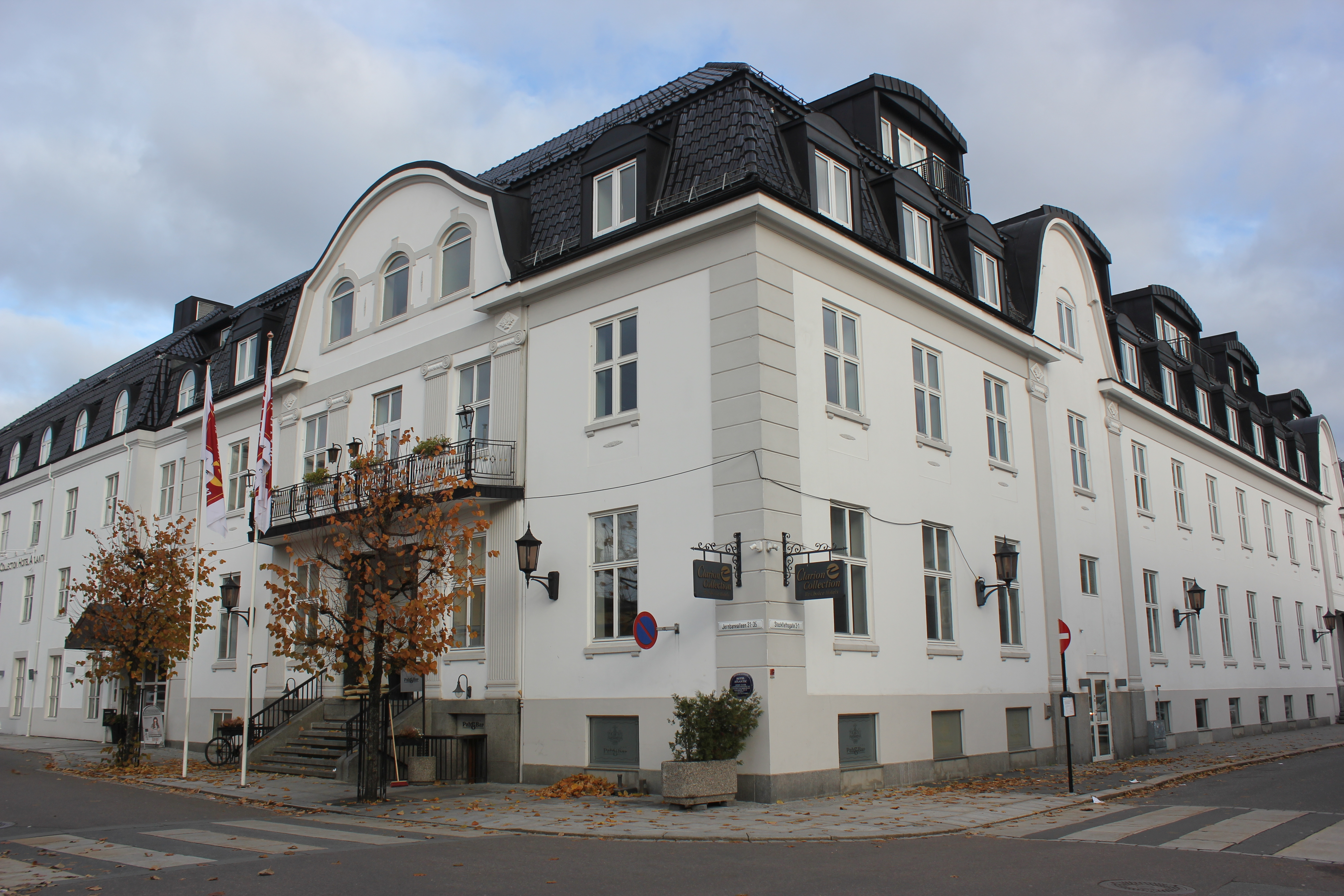
Clarion Collection Hotel Atlantic in Sandefjord, Norway

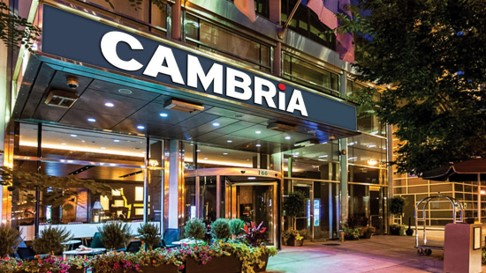
Cambria Chicago Magnificent Mile

Choice Hotels International is the parent company of a number of hotel brands split among various market segments, in addition to a vacation rentals brand. As of the third quarter 2023, Choice Hotels franchised nearly 7,500 hotels, representing nearly 630,000 rooms, in 46 countries and territories.

Brand	Price category	Added to Choice Hotels system	Locations (2023)
Park Plaza	Upper upscale	2022 (acquired)	1
Radisson Blu	Upper upscale	2022 (acquired)	10
Radisson RED	Upscale	2022 (acquired)	4
Radisson (core)	Upscale	2022 (acquired)	111
Radisson Individuals	Upscale soft brand	2022 (acquired)	9
Radisson Collection	Upscale soft brand	2024	0
Cambria Hotels	Upscale select service	2007	74
Ascend Collection	Upscale soft brand	2008	363
Radisson Inn & Suites	Upper midscale	2024	0
Comfort Inn & Suites	Upper midscale (economy in Norway, Sweden, and Lithuania)	1981	2,162
Country Inn & Suites	Upper midscale	2022 (acquired)	434
Park Inn by Radisson	Midscale	2022 (acquired)	16
Clarion	Midscale (upscale in Australia, Norway, Denmark, Sweden, and Finland)	1987 (acquired)	246
Clarion Pointe	Midscale select service	2019	60
Quality Inn	Midscale	1939	1,902
Sleep Inn	Midscale	1989	452
Everhome Suites	Midscale extended stay	2022	1
MainStay Suites	Midscale extended stay	1996	127
Suburban Studios	Economy extended stay	2005 (acquired)	104
WoodSpring Suites	Economy extended stay	2018 (acquired)	235
Econo Lodge	Economy	1990 (acquired)	732
Rodeway Inn	Economy	1990 (acquired)	480
Total			7,527

== See also ==
- Strawberry, the largest Choice Hotels franchisee in Scandinavia
