= Econo Lodge =

North American motel chain

- Type: Economy motel
- Industry: Hotel franchising
- Founded: 1969; 57 years ago (as Econo-Travel); Norfolk, Virginia, U.S.
- Founders: Vernon Myers Sr.; Vernon Myers Jr.; Lloyd Tarbutton
- Number of locations: 698 (as of December 31, 2024)
- Area served: U.S. and Canada
- Parent: Choice Hotels
- Website: www.choicehotels.com/econo-lodge

Econo Lodge is an American economy hotel brand and one of the longest running limited service lodging chains in the United States. Founded in Norfolk, Virginia, in 1969 as Econo Travel, the brand pioneered a simplified budget hotel model that emphasized clean, standardized rooms without the full service amenities—such as restaurants, pools, and large lobbies—common in mid century motels. Econo Lodge is now a subsidiary of Choice Hotels and operates more than 690 locations across the United States and Canada.

== History ==
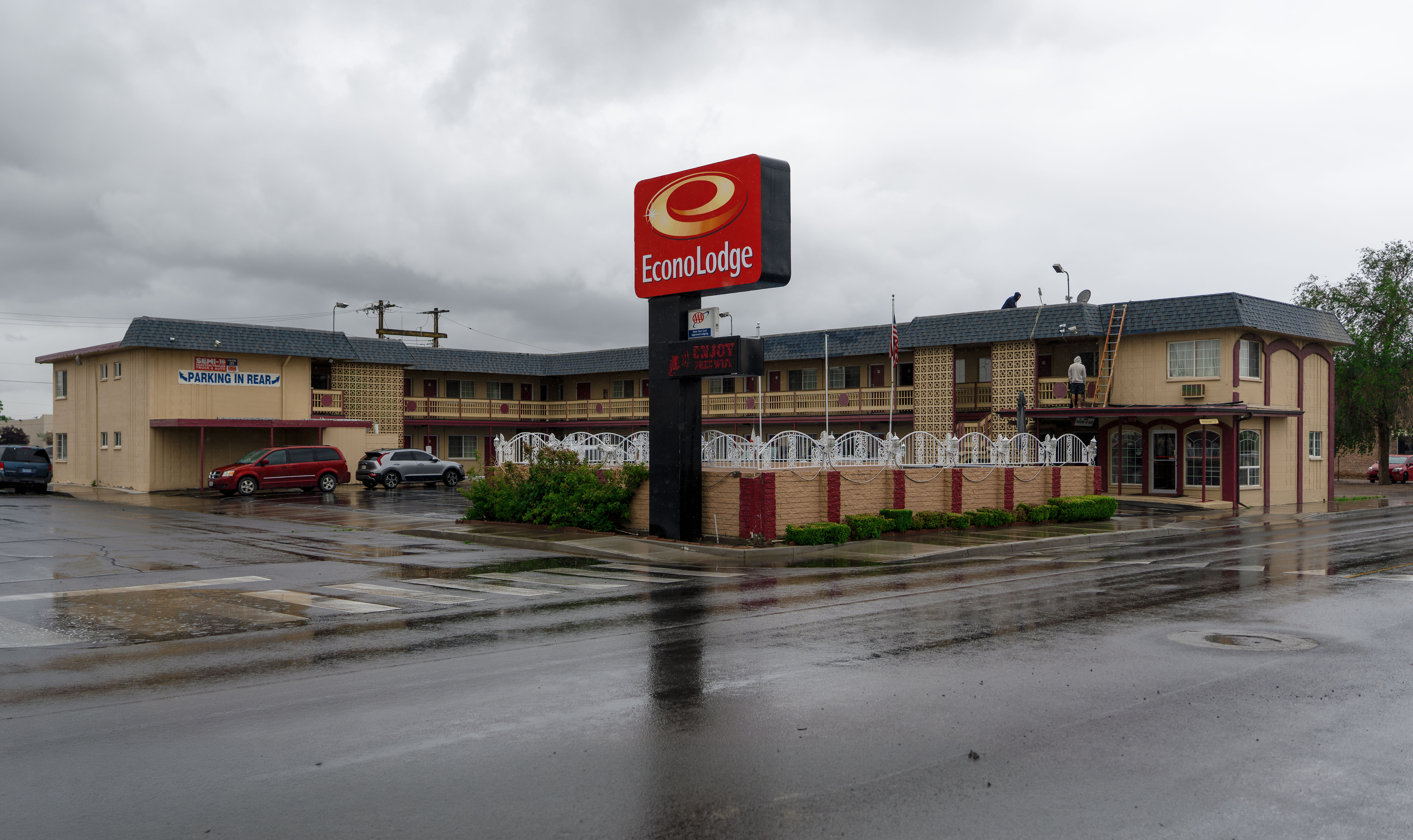
Econo Lodge in Fallon, Nevada

=== Origins (1965–1969) ===
The Econo Travel concept was developed in the mid 1960s by Norfolk businessman Lloyd Tarbutton and builder Vernon Myers. Their prototype featured 48 rooms, a compact lobby, and a manager’s apartment, eliminating many amenities to reduce construction and operating costs. Early operational features included bed boxes to simplify housekeeping, centralized electrical panels, and strategically placed maid closets.

The first Econo Travel Motor Hotel opened in Norfolk, Virginia, in 1969 and quickly demonstrated strong profitability, leading to rapid franchising across the southeastern United States.

=== Expansion and Rebranding (1969–1982) ===
Franchising accelerated throughout the 1970s. The company acquired the rights to the name Econo Lodge in 1972, initially applying it to conversions of existing motels. By 1982, all Econo Travel properties had been rebranded as Econo Lodge.

=== Ownership Changes (1983–1990) ===
In 1983, the company was sold to investor Ben Douglas, who relocated headquarters to Charlotte, North Carolina. After a period of financial instability, control passed to investor Paul Wallace, who restructured operations and restored profitability. Wallace later sold Econo Lodge to Choice Hotels International in 1990.

== Econo Lodge Franchisee Association (ELFA) ==
The Econo Lodge Franchisee Association (ELFA) was established in 1974 during a period of economic uncertainty and declining travel demand. Franchisees organized to collaborate on cost saving measures, operational standards, and brand strategy. ELFA is recognized as the first independent franchisee association in the U.S. lodging industry.

Following the brand’s acquisition by Choice Hotels, ELFA negotiated the creation of a dedicated Brand Chairman position to ensure franchisee representation within the larger multi brand system. ELFA continues to operate as an independent association representing Econo Lodge franchisees nationwide.

== Brand Positioning and Hotel Features ==
On their website, ELF states that Econo Lodge remains positing as an “Easy Stop on the Road,” noting simplicity, essential amenities, and convenience.

=== Core Features (All Properties) ===
Econo Lodge properties typically offer:

- Free Wi Fi throughout the property
- Free coffee
- Microwaves and refrigerators in all rooms
- Flat panel televisions
- Premium movie channel or on demand TV channels
- Bedside charging outlets

=== Select Features (Available at Some Locations) ===
- Continental breakfast
- In room coffee makers
- Pet friendly accommodations
- On site laundry facilities
- Swimming pool and/or fitness center
- Basic business services

=== Location Strategy ===
Econo Lodge properties are typically located near:

- Major highway exits
- Airports
- Tourist destinations
- Suburban commercial corridors

=== Franchise Structure ===
Econo Lodge operates as a fully franchised brand, resulting in:

- Variation in property age, design, and modernization
- A mix of converted motels and purpose built structures
- A consistent focus on affordability and essential services rather than uniform architecture

While often reviewed as basic or older compared to midscale brands, Econo Lodge is recognized for delivering functional, budget friendly lodging that meets the needs of cost conscious travelers.

== Legacy ==
Econo Lodge is regarded as one of the earliest standardized budget hotel chains in the United States. Its operational model influenced later economy brands and contributed to the development of modern limited service lodging.

== See also ==
- List of motels
