= Cambria Hotels =

Hotel franchise brand run by Choice Hotels

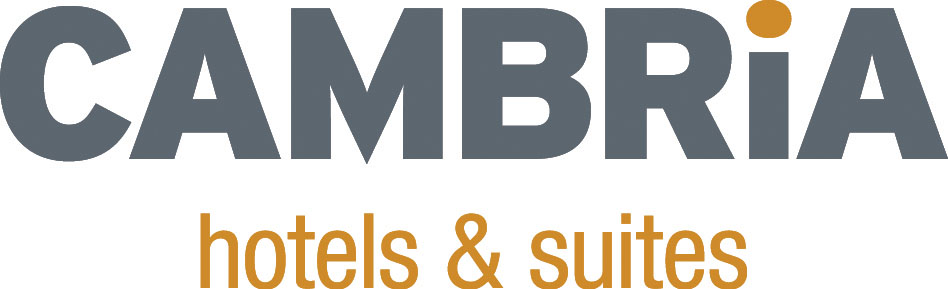
- Industry: Hospitality
- Founded: 2005
- Number of locations: 76 (March 31, 2025).
- Area served: U.S.
- Owner: Choice Hotels
- Website: www.choicehotels.com/cambria

Cambria Hotels is a hotel franchise launched in 2005 by Choice Hotels International. As of March 31, 2025, there are 76 U.S. locations in operation with 10,344 rooms. Competitors include Courtyard by Marriott and Hilton Garden Inn.

== History ==
Cambria Suites, an upscale brand, was unveiled by Choice Hotels in 2005, the first brand the company had launched since 1996. The first Cambria Hotel opened in Boise, Idaho, in 2007. The new brand had four franchised properties by late 2007 and over 20 by 2010. The 199-room location was selected because of its proximity to the airport.

By late 2007, the new brand had four franchised properties in secondary markets like Mall of America in Bloomington, Minnesota. Between 2008 and 2010, Cambria Suites expanded from a handful of franchised properties to over 20, with locations in Madison, Wisconsin, San Antonio, Texas, and Baton Rouge, Louisiana.

Cambria continued to expand its U.S. presence throughout the mid-2010s, with new franchised locations in Washington D.C, Los Angeles, and Times Square. In 2018, the brand passed the 40-hotel mark with a new build in Hanover, Maryland. It was the fourth location to open in the Baltimore-Washington metropolitan region, in which Choice Hotels is also headquartered. In 2019, Cambria debuted its 50th and largest franchised location, a 352-room hotel next to Disneyland in Anaheim, California.

== Corporate Affairs ==
Cambria Suites was developed to target the low end of the upscale market within the U.S. Many Cambria properties include conference centers to cater to business travelers. Several Cambria hotels are located within historic buildings, such as the Great Southwest Building in Houston, TX and above the Oriental Theater in Chicago, IL.

In 2014, Choice Hotels rebranded the Cambria Hotels chain as Cambria Hotels & Suites. The rebrand came with a new prototype hotel which included a bar in the lobby, indie-style music, updated furniture, and larger bathrooms.

== See also ==
- List of hotels
