= Grand Union Hotel =

Grand Union Hotel can refer to:

- Grand Union Hotel (Newbury Park, California), listed on the National Register of Historic Places
- Grand Union Hotel (Fort Benton, Montana), listed on the National Register of Historic Places
- Grand Union Hotel (Saratoga Springs, New York)

== See also ==
- Grand Hotel Union, Ljubljana, Slovenia
- Union Hotel (disambiguation)
