= WoodSpring Suites =

American extended stay hotel chain

- Formerly: Value Place (2003–2015)
- Type: Extended Stay Hotel
- Industry: Hotel
- Founded: 2003; 23 years ago
- Founder: Jack DeBoer
- Number of locations: 256 (as of December 31, 2024)
- Area served: United States
- Parent: Choice Hotels
- Website: www.woodspring.com

WoodSpring Suites, originally named Value Place, is an extended stay hotel brand owned by Choice Hotels. As of December 2024, there were 256 hotels with 30,846 rooms across the United States.

== Overview ==
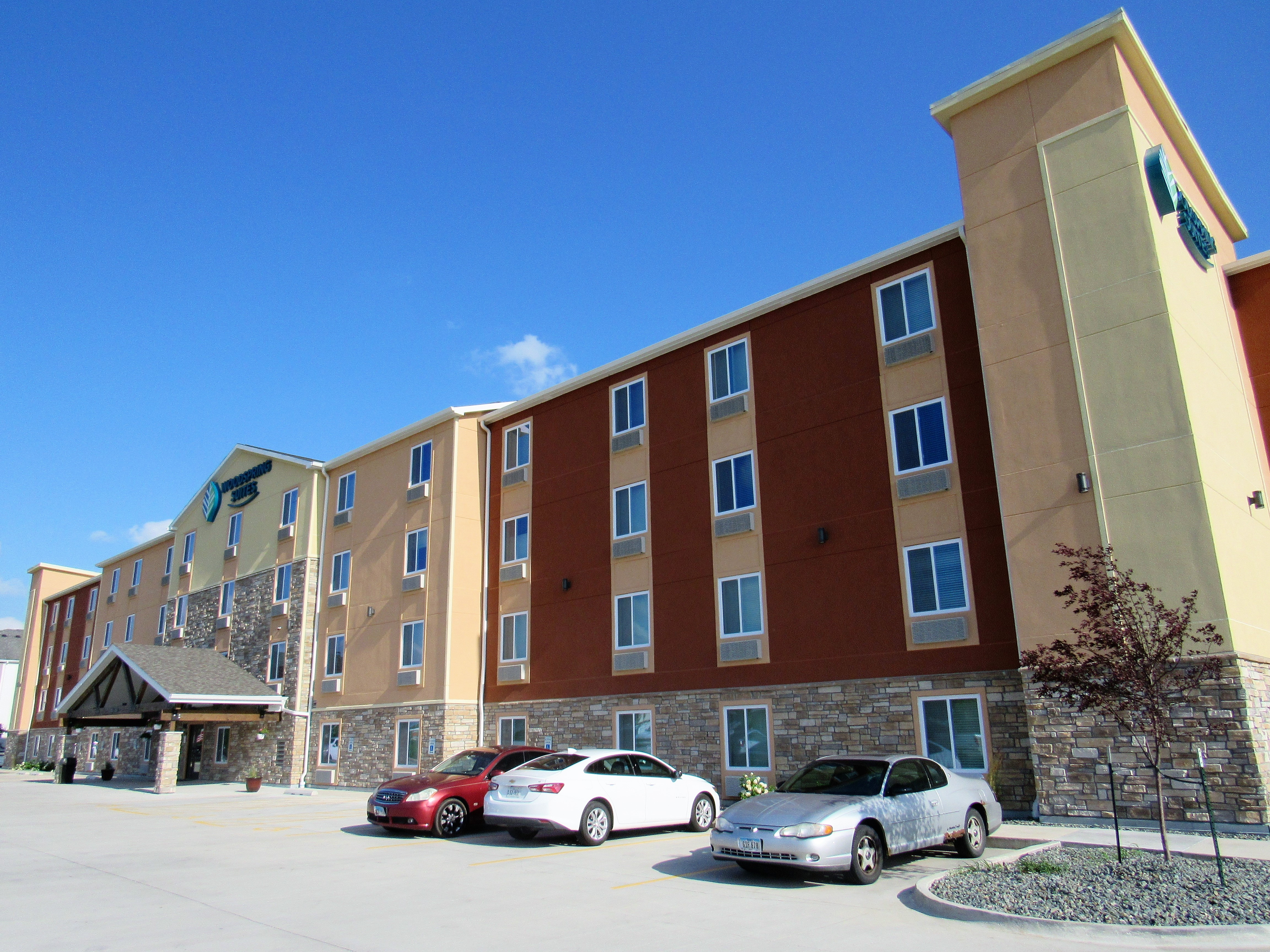
WoodSpring Suites in Davenport, Iowa

The hotel chain was founded as Value Place in 2003 by Jack DeBoer. DeBoer, who kickstarted the extended-stay hotel segment back in the 1970s, also founded Residence Inn, now owned by Marriott, and Candlewood Suites, now owned by IHG. The brand was pitched as hotel-apartment hybrid with a one-week minimum stay and a minimalist design.

The first Value Place opened in Wichita, Kansas, in 2004. Other early locations included a hotel in Lubbock, Texas, and several properties in Oklahoma City. By 2009, the brand had almost 150 locations in operation.

The brand underwent a revamp in 2013, when a new 123-room "Value Place 2.0" prototype debuted. The aim was to reduce operational costs, making properties easier and quicker to clean. Other changes included new air-conditioning units, LED lights, and motion-controlled lighting.

In April 2015, the company changed its name from Value Place to WoodSpring Suites. Bruce Haase, the CEO of WoodSpring at that time, remarked that customers had been "reluctant to stay with us because of what our brand name communicated to them". At the time of the change, the company had 84 company-owned locations and 112 franchised locations. 2015 also saw the arrival of a mid-priced spinoff brand, WoodSpring Suites Signature. The spinoff featured a fitness center, laundry facilities, and meeting spaces.

In December 2017, private equity-firm Lindsay Goldberg sold WoodSpring Suites brand and franchise to Choice Hotels for approximately $231 million. At the time of acquisition the brand had around 240 locations.

== Concept ==
WoodSpring Suites operates in the economy extended-stay segment, serving longer-term guests. The model emphasizes in-room kitchen space, including appliances such as refrigerators, microwaves, cooktops, and dishwashers, along with defined eating, living, and sleeping areas. With less community amenity space and fewer daily services than many traditional hotel formats, this approach supports consistent occupancy and more efficient operations.
