= Quality Inn =

American multinational chain of hotels

- Type: Franchise
- Industry: Hospitality
- Founded: 1939; 87 years ago
- Headquarters: North Bethesda, Maryland, U. S.
- Number of locations: 1,899 (as of December 31, 2024)
- Area served: Worldwide
- Parent: Choice Hotels
- Website: choicehotels.com/quality-inn

Quality Inn is an American multinational chain of hotels based in North Bethesda, Maryland. It is a subsidiary of Choice Hotels which has operations in more than 40 countries. Quality Inn is the founding brand of Choice Hotels International with more than 1,800 hotels worldwide, as of 2024.

== History ==
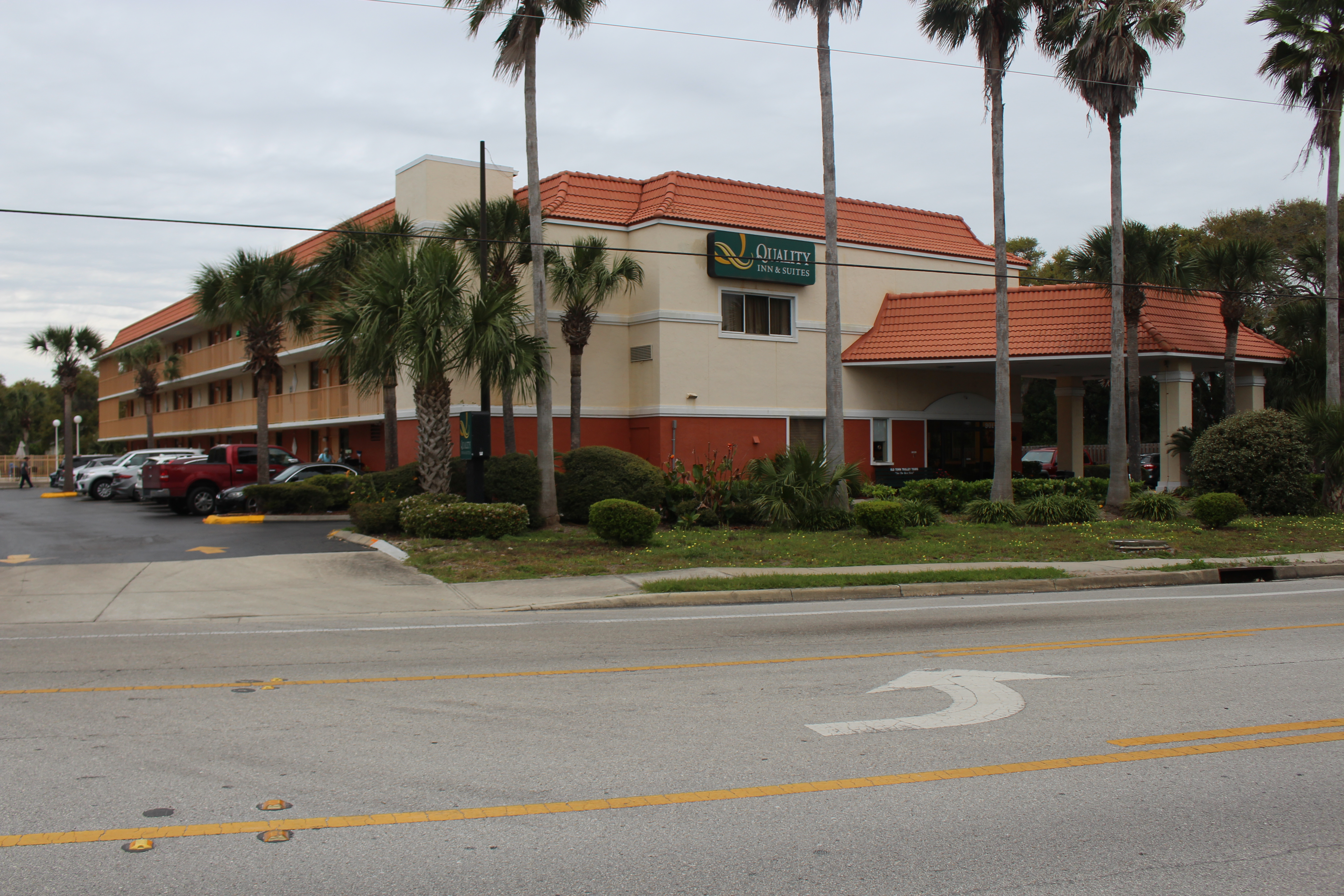
Quality Inn in St. Augustine Beach

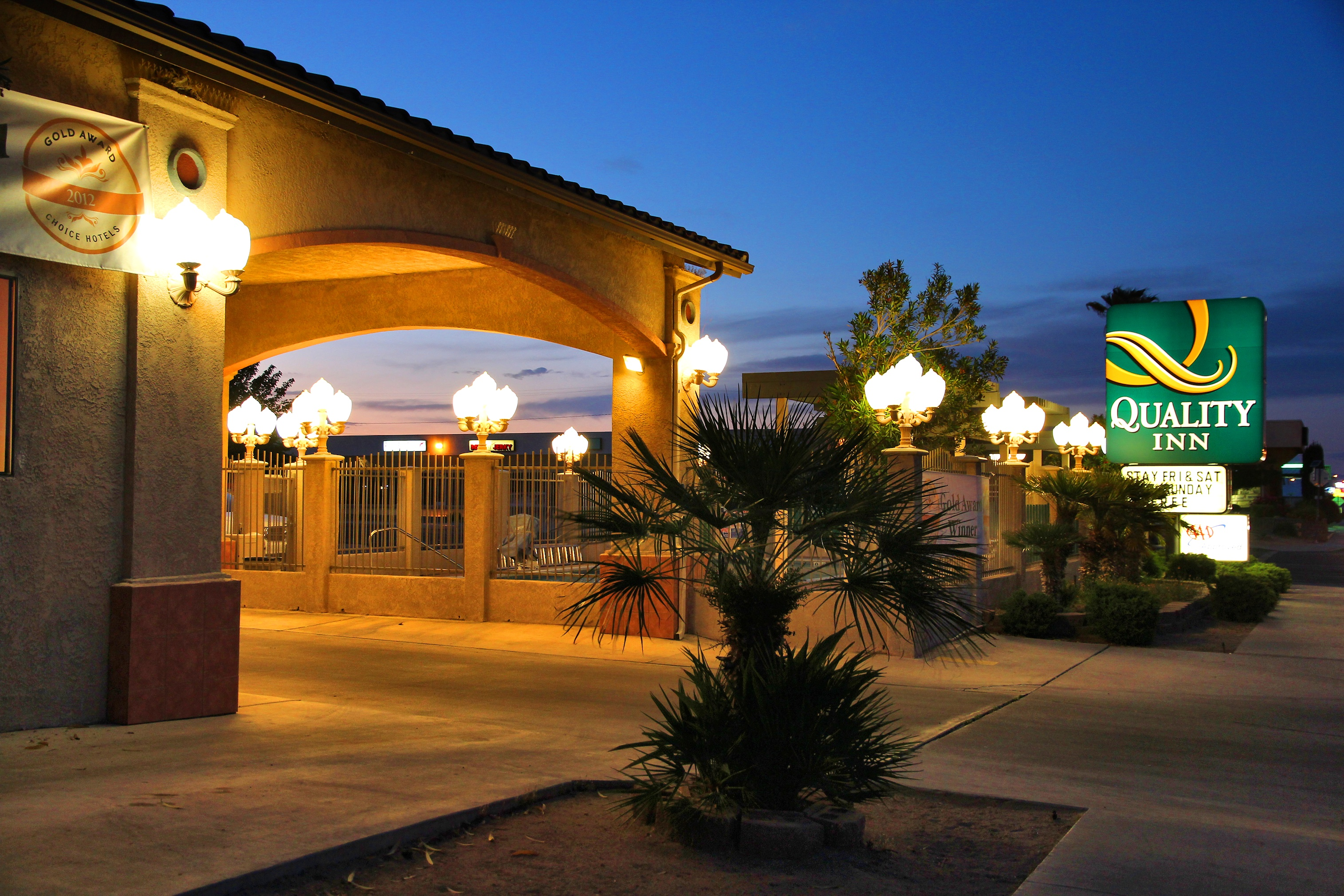
Quality Inn evening view

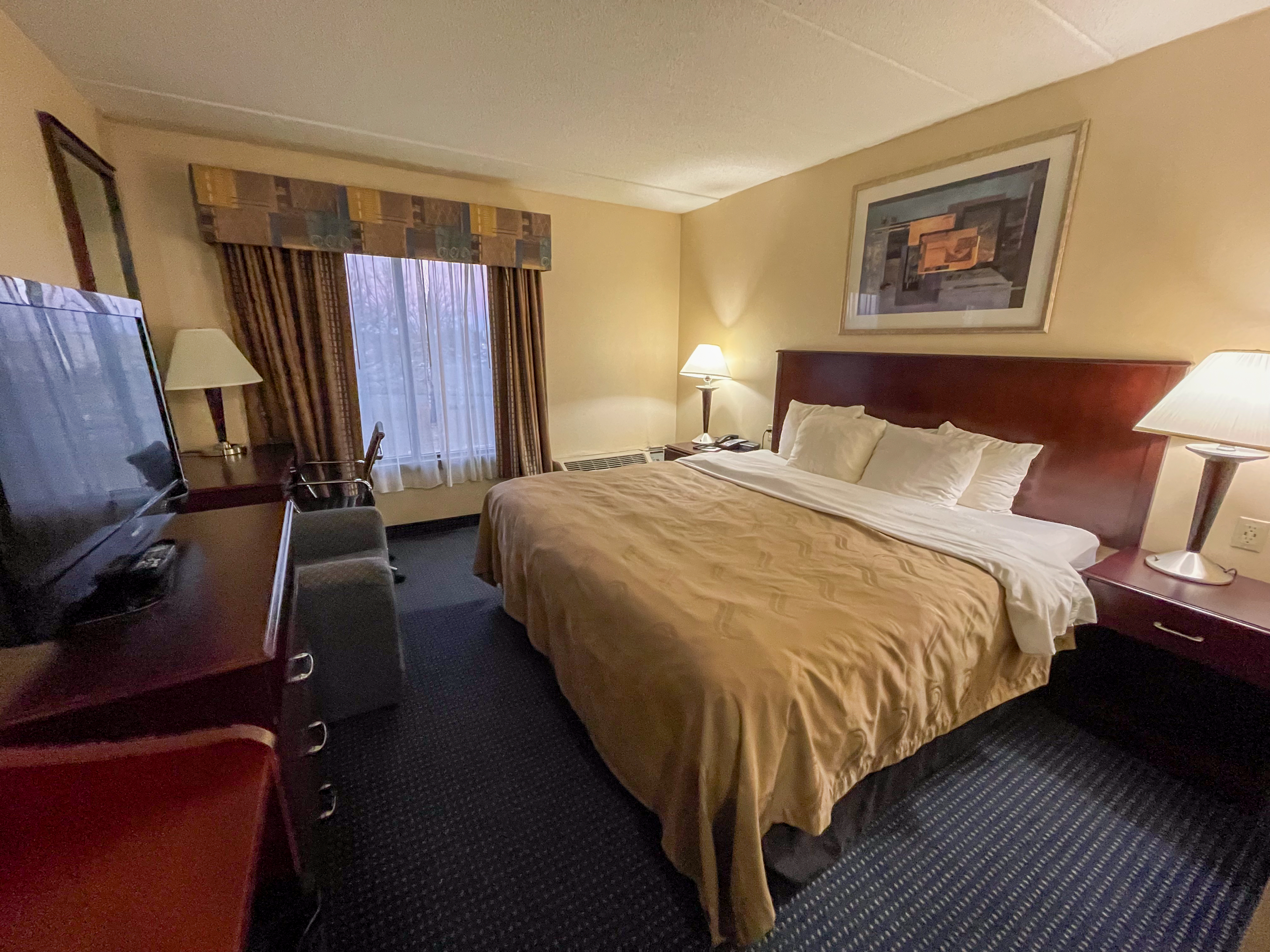
Bedroom at Quality Inn Near Princeton

Quality Inn began in Florida in 1939 as a marketing cooperative for seven motor court owners. The arrangement was formalized two years later with the establishment of Quality Courts United, a nonprofit membership corporation. It was the first hotel chain in the United States.

Quality Courts United was among the first in the industry to offer wall-to-wall carpeting, daily linen changes, 24-hour desk service, and in-room telephones. By 1946, the association grew to 50 hotels and to 100 hotels by 1952. The end of the decade saw rapid expansion, as the number of affiliates grew from 340 in 1959 to almost 600 in 1963. Quality Courts United became a for-profit organization in 1963 and changed its name to Quality Courts Motels, Inc.

Stewart Bainum, a former plumbing contractor, played a major role in the chain in the 1960s. He opened his first hotel in Silver Spring, Maryland in 1957 (today this location is within the Takoma Park, Maryland town borders). An early franchisee, Bainum purchased his first Quality Court in 1963, and owned five franchised locations by 1968.

In 1968, Stewart Bainum's company, Park Consolidated Motels, acquired Quality Courts Motels. Following the purchase, Park Consolidated renamed itself Quality Courts, Inc. Stewart Bainum became the president and chief executive officer of the renamed company, and moved its headquarters to Silver Spring, Maryland.

In 1972, Quality Courts was renamed and rebranded to Quality Inns International, Inc. to reflect its growing global presence. The company suffered a significant setback the following year, when the 1973 oil crisis reduced motor traffic, resulting in hotel closures. In the early 1980s, Quality Inn divided into three distinct groups: Quality Royale (upscale), Quality Inn (midscale), and Comfort Inn (economy). In 1988, the company introduced 46 all-suite locations under the names Quality Suites and Comfort Suite Hotels. By 1990, Quality Inns International changed its name to Choice Hotels International, with Quality Inn remaining one of its brands.

== See also ==
- List of hotels
- Choice Hotels
