= Union Hotel =

Union Hotel may refer to:

== Canada ==
- Union Hotel (Toronto, ON)
- Union Hotel, now site of the British High Commission (Ottawa, ON)

== United States ==
- Union Hotel (Benicia, California), a California Historical Landmark, Sonoma County, California
- The Union Hotel, La Porte, California
- A former hotel in Wheeling, Illinois
- Union Hotel (Cundy's Harbor, Maine), listed on the NRHP in Maine
- Union Hotel (Meridian, Mississippi), listed on the NRHP in Mississippi
- Union Hotel (Wakefield, New Hampshire), listed on the NRHP in New Hampshire
- Union Hotel (Flemington, New Jersey), listed on the NRHP in New Jersey
- Union Hotel (Sackets Harbor, New York), listed on the NRHP in New York
- Union Hotel (Shepherdstown, Pennsylvania), listed on the NRHP in Pennsylvania
- Union Hotel (Washington, D.C.)

== See also ==
- Bella Union Hotel, Los Angeles, California
- Grand Hotel Union, Ljubljana, Slovenia
- Grand Union Hotel (disambiguation)
