= List of inns in Bucharest =

This is a List of inns in Bucharest. The inns of Bucharest, Romania. These provide hospitality, as well as warehouse and office space. Inns have played a major role in the economic and cultural development of the city from the late 17th to the early 19th century. Many of them were located on Lipscani.

- Constantin Vodă Inn
- Colțea Inn
- Filaret Inn
- Filipescu Inn
- Gabroveni Inn
- Greeks' Inn
- Hanul cu Tei
- Manuc's Inn
- Saint George's Inn
- Șerban Vodă Inn
- Zlătari Inn

== See also ==
- List of buildings in Bucharest
