= Sleep Inn =

Midscale hotel chain run by Choice Hotels

- Industry: Hospitality
- Founded: 1988; 38 years ago
- Number of locations: 438 (as of 2024)
- Area served: Americas
- Parent: Choice Hotels
- Website: www.choicehotels.com/sleep-inn

Sleep Inn is an American midscale hotel brand operated by Choice Hotels International. Its principal competitors include Best Western and Baymont.

== History ==
In 1988, Choice Hotels launched Sleep Inn, a new "luxury-budget" concept. The original name was "McSleep Inn", with then-CEO Robert Hazard stating, "The concept is just like McDonald's." Following a lawsuit by McDonald's Corp, the brand was renamed Sleep Inn. Its first locations, which featured 12-by-16-foot rooms, were financed through the Small Business Administration’s 7(a) program.

Sleep Inn grew steadily, with 13 hotels in the US by 1993. By 2001, the portfolio had grown to 280 properties, offering 256-square-foot rooms at an average price of mid-$50s. That year also marked the Sleep Inn's European debut in Cambridge.

A 2016 prototype hotel saw design changes for Sleep Inn, such as communal tables and custom artwork. The brand reached its 400th location in 2019, the same year a new logo was introduced for Sleep Inn and MainStay Suites as part of Choice Hotels' 80th anniversary. Sleep Inn has also expanded to Europe, with the first location slated to open in November 2022.

== Corporate affairs ==
Sleep Inn is a new-construction brand. In 2024, the brand introduced the "Scenic Dream" prototype hotel, which was intended to make more efficient use of space, while also reduce operating and building costs. It featured a nature-inspired interior with calming colors, landscape murals, movable furniture, and more open lobby spaces.

=== Dual-branded locations ===
In 2012, Choice Hotels introduced a dual-brand hotel concept pairing Sleep Inn with MainStay Suites, one of Choice Hotels' extended stay brands. The idea was to lower operating costs by utilizing a single front desk and service staff, while allowing Sleep Inns to benefit from the higher occupancy rates of MainStay Suites. By 2018, there were 10 operational dual-branded hotels.

== See also ==
- List of hotels
