= Candlewood Suites =

All-suite extended-stay hotel chain run by IHG

Candlewood Suites by IHG
- Type: Subsidiary
- Industry: Hotel
- Founded: 1995
- Founders: Jack Deboer, Jim Korroch
- Number of locations: 367 (2022)
- Area served: Worldwide
- Parent: IHG Hotels & Resorts
- Website: www.ihg.com/candlewood/

Candlewood Suites by IHG is a hotel chain brand owned by IHG Hotels & Resorts.

== History ==
The Candlewood Suites chain was started in 1995 by Jack Deboer, founder of the Residence Inn and co-founder of the Summerfield Suites chain. The first hotel was built on North Webb Road in Wichita, Kansas, United States, and opened in 1996.

From 1995 to 2003, Candlewood Hotel Company franchised and managed hotels throughout the US. In January 2004, Candlewood Suites was acquired by IHG. As of September 30, 2007, there were 151 Candlewood Suites hotels currently open, with 187 hotels in the pipeline, with an estimated 50 of these hotels opening during 2007. There are now [when?] 342 locations worldwide. Candlewood competes with other value-priced, extended-stay hotels, such as TownePlace Suites and Mainstay Suites.

In 2024, IHG announced the entry of the Candlewood Suites brand into the German market as part of a vast franchise and cooperation agreement with German hotel operator Novum Hospitality, which, in turn, will rebrand its current acora living the city apartment hotels to Candlewood Suites.

== Description ==
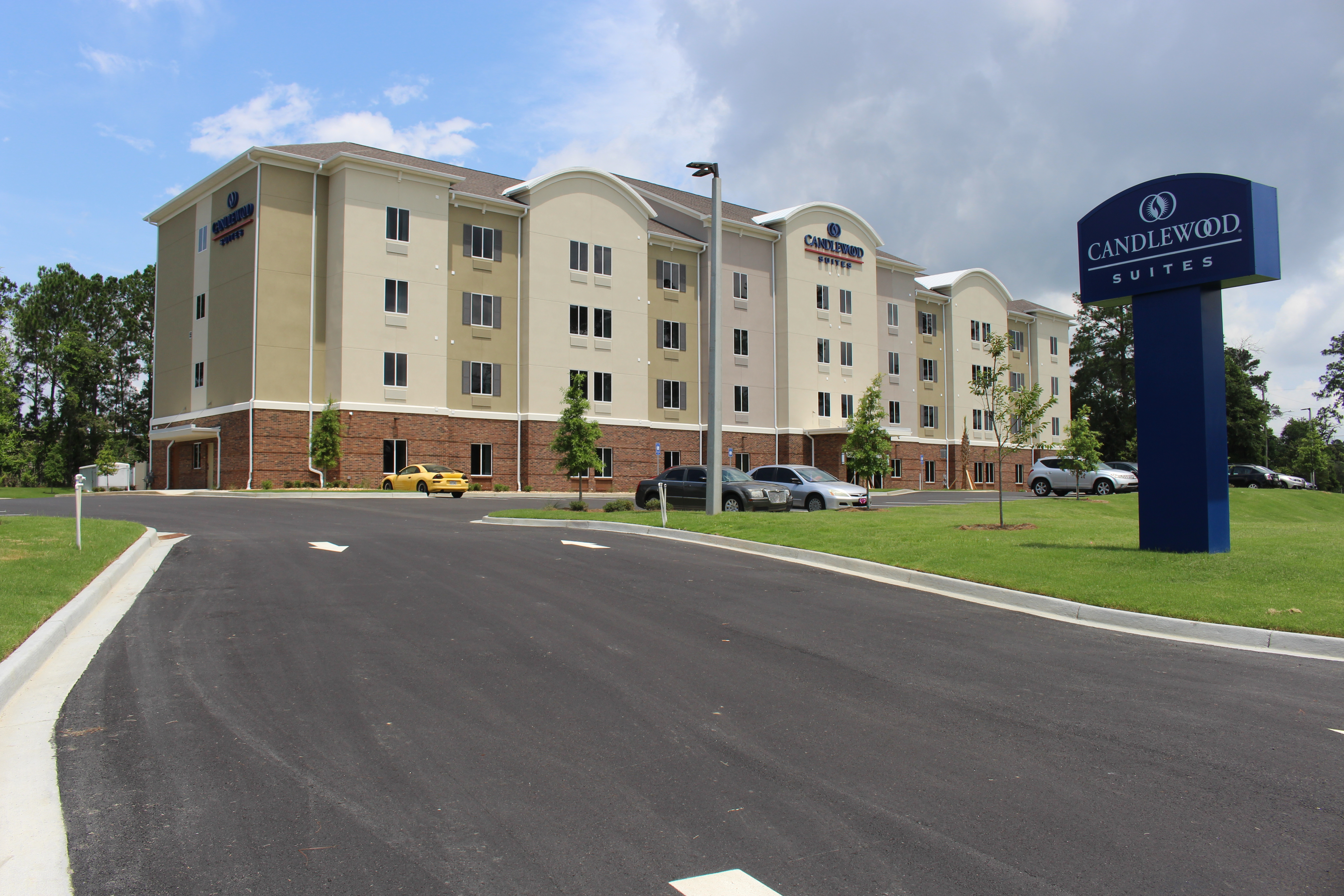
Candlewood Suites in Valdosta, Georgia

The brand's locations are extended-stay hotels focused primarily on rate-sensitive business travelers, also known as corporate transient travelers. Typically corporate transient travelers stay only during the week, leaving the occupancy of the subject hotels lower during the weekend. However, with true extended-stay business being over seven days, and often beyond 30 days, it allows the hotel to maintain a higher occupancy average overall. While this occupancy generally comes with a lower average rate or average daily rate (ADR), the revenue per available room sold (RevPAR) is typically higher as a result of the significantly higher occupancy and penetration rate within the respective markets. Consistent with the extended-stay business, housekeeping staff and expense are greatly reduced with the operations of this type of hotel since daily room cleanings are not provided to extended-stay guests.
