= Lists of hotels =

This is a list of hotel-related list articles.

== By brand ==
- List of chained-brand hotels
  - List of Marriott hotels

== By type ==
- List of caravanserais
- List of casino hotels
- List of largest hotels
- List of integrated resorts
- List of motels
- List of tallest hotels

== By country ==
- Hotels are indexed by country in alphabetical order and are mainly five or four star hotels, notable skyscraper landmarks or historic hotels, which are covered in multiple reliable publications.

== By city ==
=== China ===
- List of hotels in Beijing

=== India ===
- List of hotels in Bengaluru
- List of hotels in Chennai
- List of hotels in Hyderabad

=== Philippines ===
- List of hotels in Metro Manila

=== Romania ===
- List of inns in Bucharest

=== Sri Lanka ===
- List of hotels in Sri Lanka

=== Turkey ===
- Hotels in Istanbul

=== United Arab Emirates ===
- List of hotels in Dubai

=== United Kingdom ===
- Hotels in London

=== United States ===
- List of Las Vegas Strip hotels
- List of hotels in Los Angeles
- List of hotels in New York City
  - List of former hotels in Manhattan

== By region ==
- List of hotels in the Caribbean
- List of largest hotels in Europe
- List of historic hotels in Otago (New Zealand)

== Defunct ==
- List of defunct hotel chains

== See also ==
- Hilton Hotel (disambiguation)
- List of lists of lists
- Union Hotel (disambiguation)
