= Guertin =

Guertin is a surname. Notable people with the surname include:

- Aimé Guertin (1898–1970), Canadian politician and businessman
- Carolyn A. Guertin (1928–2020), American member of the Civil Air Patrol
- Carolyn Guertin, Canadian artist and writer
- George Albert Guertin (1869–1931), American Roman Catholic bishop
- Kenneth Guertin (born 1966), American film director, screenwriter, producer and editor
- M. K. Guertin (1891–1970), American hotel chain founder
- Philippe Guertin (born 1991), Canadian long-distance swimmer
- Robbie Guertin, American indie rock musician
- Heather Guertin, American Abstract painter
