= Friendship Inn =

American motel chain

- Company type: Economy motel
- Industry: Hotel
- Founded: 1961; 65 years ago Salt Lake City, Utah, U.S.
- Defunct: 1997
- Parent: Choice Hotels

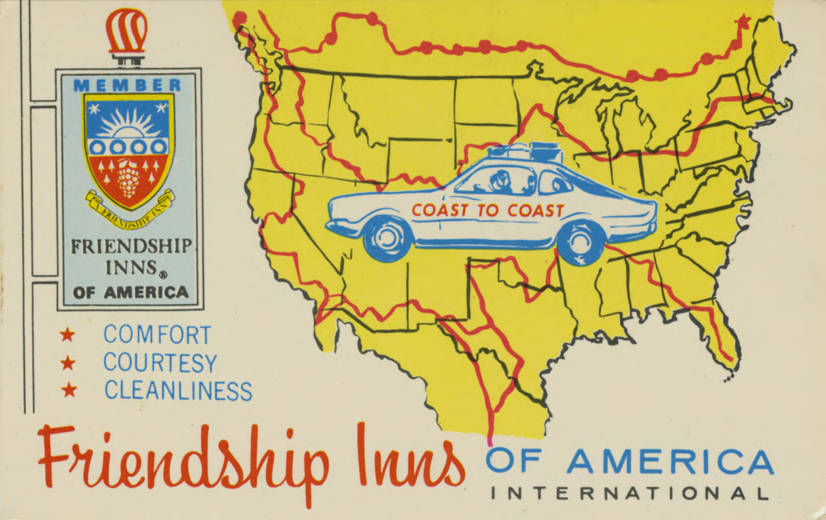
A promotional postcard from Friendship Inns of America.

Friendship Inn was an American motel chain. Established as a referral chain based in Salt Lake City, Utah in 1961, Friendship Inns of America did not require its members to meet the same restrictive standards or high membership fees as many competing chains of the time. As a result, the Friendship Inn branding spread rapidly, with 771 member locations in 1974, largely older independent motels with low prices and limited amenities. The chain's logo, which remained the same throughout its lifetime, was a coat of arms designed by a British heraldry expert. In 1985, the referral chain was converted into a corporate franchise, managed by the new Friendship Inns Franchising Corporation based in North Bergen, New Jersey. By 1989, the number of Friendship Inn franchises had fallen to 129. That same year, Friendship Inn was acquired by Econo Lodges of America, which in turn was bought out by Quality Inns International (later Choice Hotels) in 1990. In 1997, Friendship Inn was eliminated, with its locations being converted to the Econo Lodge brand, as well as Econo Lodge's sister brand, Rodeway Inn.

== See also ==
- List of motels
