= Scottish Inns =

Hotel chain in the United States

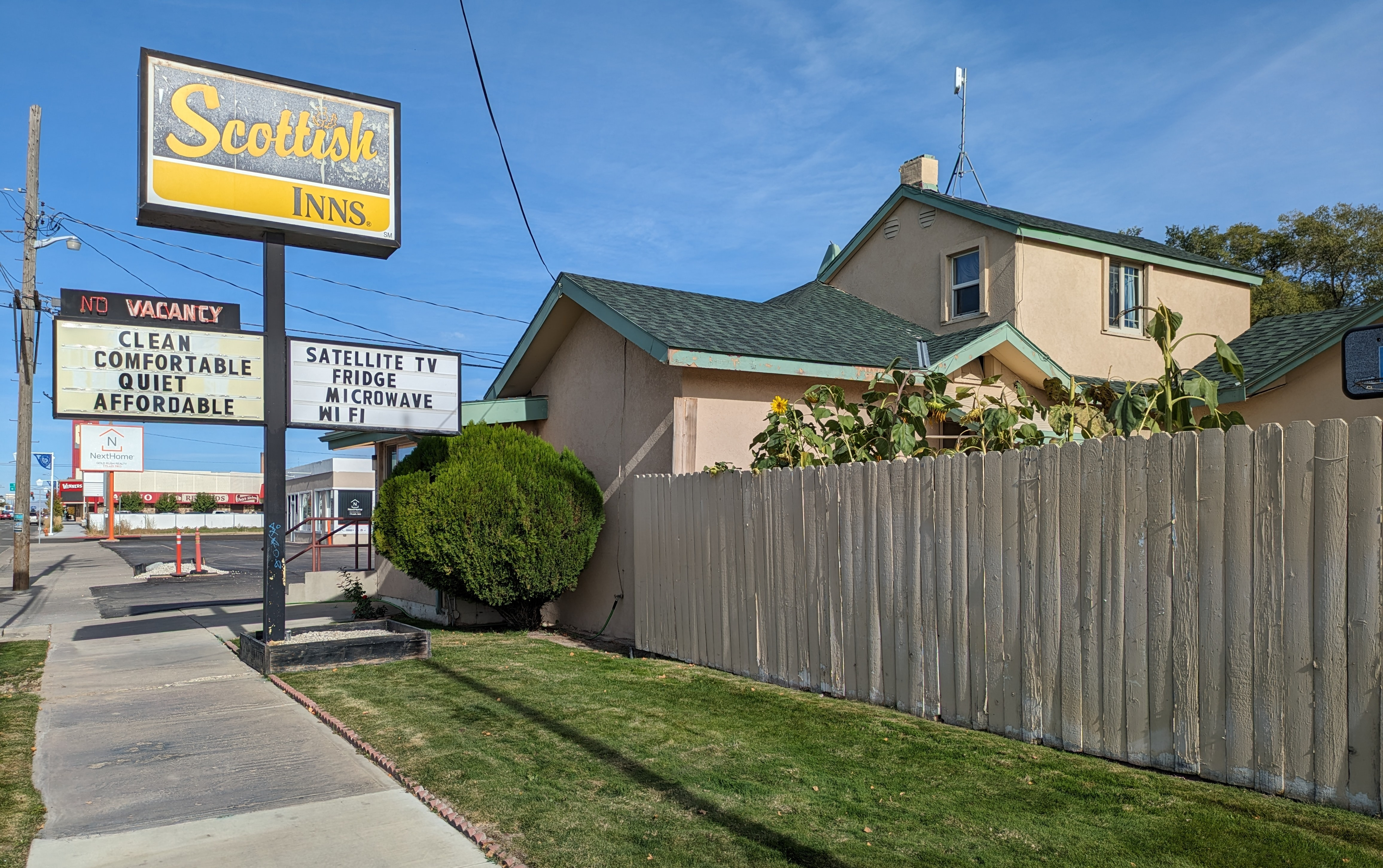
Scottish Inns in Winnemucca, Nevada

Scottish Inns is a motel chain in the United States. It is a brand of Hospitality International.

== History ==
The Scottish Inns chain began in the late 1960s in Tennessee. It was a company that did not operate its own motels, but leased out the name to others. This changed in 1973, as the company assumed ownership of almost all properties.

The Scottish Inns chain blossomed in the late 1960s when Scottish Inns of America was formed as builder and owner of modular constructed motels with an emphasis on economy lodging. This Kingston, Tennessee based company adopted the Scottish theme of thriftiness, much like the Imperial 400 chain of its time. The one big difference, though, was Scottish Inns were built from modules constructed in plants in either Tennessee or Florida and shipped to the motel sites. This concept was possibly considered the lowest price for a constructed motel room at $6,000 each (installed) and in 1972 they could be produced at a rate of about one room per hour.

The company owned the motels when finished but did not operate them. They instead leased the motels to independent operators. Scottish Inns also became a franchise operation. However, in 1973, Scottish Inns of America, Inc., with executive offices in Kingston, Tennessee, assumed the management of most of their facilities. A 1974 Scottish Inns of America locations directory featured 70 Scottish Inns.

In 1978, Scottish Inns Franchise Corporation, headquartered in Goodlettsville, Tennessee, listed 31 properties in their Scottish Inns Directory. They had grown to 50 properties by 1981. Soon thereafter, Southern Scottish Inns, Inc. and Red Carpet Inns International, Inc. created a new corporation, Hospitality International, Inc., and subsequently moved to Atlanta, Georgia, at which time the newly formed company produced its 1983 International Travel Directory featuring a combined 126 properties with either the Scottish Inns, Master Hosts Inns or Red Carpet Inn brands.

In 1985, the Scottish Inns chain was acquired by Red Carpet Inn. The merged company was called Hospitality International.

Many changes have taken place since the Scottish Inns modular concept, with only a handful of original Scottish Inns modular buildings still flagged as a Scottish Inns brand. Nearly 30% of the existing 130 Scottish Inns are new construction facilities, rivaling many hotels in the middle price range. In some cases they even rivaled upper scale hotels, offering similar amenities, benefits and features. However, Scottish Inns is still considered to be an economy lodging brand.

== See also ==
- List of motels
