= Carolyn Guertin =

Carolyn Guertin may refer to:

- Carolyn A. Guertin, American military aviator
- Carolyn Guertin (writer), Canadian writer
