= 1990 Atlanta Journal 500 =

29th race of the 1990 NASCAR Winston Cup Series

Race details
- Race 29 of 29 in the 1990 NASCAR Winston Cup Series
- The 1990 Atlanta Journal 500 program cover, featuring Dale Earnhardt.
- Date: November 18, 1990
- Official name: 31st Annual Atlanta Journal 500
- Location: Hampton, Georgia, Atlanta Motor Speedway
- Course: Permanent racing facility
- Course length: 1.522 miles (2.449 km)
- Distance: 328 laps, 499.216 mi (803.41 km)
- Scheduled distance: 328 laps, 499.216 mi (803.41 km)
- Average speed: 140.911 miles per hour (226.774 km/h)
- Attendance: 75,000

Pole position
Driver	Rusty Wallace	Blue Max Racing
- Time: 31.270

Most laps led
Driver	Bill Elliott	Melling Racing
- Laps: 94

Winner
No. 15	Morgan Shepherd	Bud Moore Engineering

Television in the United States
- Network: ESPN
- Announcers: Bob Jenkins, Ned Jarrett, Benny Parsons

Radio in the United States
- Radio: Motor Racing Network

The 1990 Atlanta Journal 500 was the 29th and final stock car race of the 1990 NASCAR Winston Cup Series season and the 31st iteration of the event. The race was held on Sunday, November 18, 1990, before an audience of 75,000 in Hampton, Georgia, at Atlanta Motor Speedway, a 1.522 miles (2.449 km) permanent asphalt quad-oval intermediate speedway. The race took the scheduled 328 laps to complete. In the final laps of the race, Bud Moore Engineering driver Morgan Shepherd would manage to defend the field on the final 21-lap green flag stint of the race to take his third career NASCAR Winston Cup Series victory and his only victory of the season.

In the driver's championship, Dale Earnhardt, after keeping his car within the lead pack throughout the race, was able to finish third and ahead of championship contender Mark Martin. Earnhardt was able to win his fourth NASCAR Winston Cup Series championship by a margin of 26 points, a margin that would not have existed if Martin had not been penalized at the 1990 Pontiac Excitement 400 where Martin had gotten penalized 46 points after the race.

On lap 300 of the race, an accident would occur on pit road when Ricky Rudd locked up his car's brakes and spun into Bill Elliott's car while Elliott was pitting, with Rudd's car hitting numerous pit crew members of Elliott's team. One of the team members for Elliott, Mike Rich, would die due to a cardiac arrest caused by injuries sustained in the crash.

== Background ==
The layout of Atlanta Motor Speedway, the circuit where the race was held.

Atlanta Motor Speedway (formerly Atlanta International Raceway) is a 1.522-mile race track in Hampton, Georgia, United States, 20 miles (32 km) south of Atlanta. It has annually hosted NASCAR Winston Cup Series stock car races since its inauguration in 1960.

The venue was bought by Speedway Motorsports in 1990. In 1994, 46 condominiums were built over the northeastern side of the track. In 1997, to standardize the track with Speedway Motorsports' other two intermediate ovals, the entire track was almost completely rebuilt. The frontstretch and backstretch were swapped, and the configuration of the track was changed from oval to quad-oval, with a new official length of 1.54-mile (2.48 km) where before it was 1.522-mile (2.449 km). The project made the track one of the fastest on the NASCAR circuit.

=== Entry list ===
- (R) - denotes rookie driver.

#	Driver	Team	Make	Sponsor
0	Delma Cowart*	H. L. Waters Racing	Ford	Masters Inn Economy
1	Terry Labonte	Precision Products Racing	Oldsmobile	Skoal
2	Ted Musgrave	U.S. Racing	Chevrolet	Crunch Ice Cream
3	Dale Earnhardt	Richard Childress Racing	Chevrolet	GM Goodwrench Service Plus
4	Ernie Irvan	Morgan–McClure Motorsports	Oldsmobile	Kodak
04	Bill Meacham	Meacham Racing	Oldsmobile	Meacham Racing
5	Ricky Rudd	Hendrick Motorsports	Chevrolet	Levi Garrett
6	Mark Martin	Roush Racing	Ford	Folgers
7	Alan Kulwicki	AK Racing	Ford	Zerex
8	Bobby Hillin Jr.	Stavola Brothers Racing	Buick	Snickers
9	Bill Elliott	Melling Racing	Ford	Coors Light
10	Derrike Cope	Whitcomb Racing	Chevrolet	Purolator Filters
11	Geoff Bodine	Junior Johnson & Associates	Ford	Budweiser
12	Hut Stricklin	Bobby Allison Motorsports	Buick	Raybestos
15	Morgan Shepherd	Bud Moore Engineering	Ford	Motorcraft
17	Darrell Waltrip	Hendrick Motorsports	Chevrolet	Tide
18	Greg Sacks	Hendrick Motorsports	Chevrolet	SlimFast
19	Chad Little	Little Racing	Ford	Bull's-Eye Barbecue Sauce
20	Steve Grissom	Moroso Racing	Oldsmobile	Crown Central Petroleum
21	Dale Jarrett	Wood Brothers Racing	Ford	Citgo
25	Ken Schrader	Hendrick Motorsports	Chevrolet	Kodiak
26	Brett Bodine	King Racing	Buick	Quaker State
27	Rusty Wallace	Blue Max Racing	Pontiac	Miller Genuine Draft
28	Davey Allison	Robert Yates Racing	Ford	Texaco, Havoline
29	Pancho Carter	Romine Racing	Ford	Dealers Engine Sales
30	Michael Waltrip	Bahari Racing	Pontiac	Country Time
33	Harry Gant	Leo Jackson Motorsports	Oldsmobile	Skoal Bandit
35	Bill Venturini	Venturini Motorsports	Chevrolet	Amoco
36	H. B. Bailey	Bailey Racing	Pontiac	Almeda Auto Parts
41	Larry Pearson	Larry Hedrick Motorsports	Chevrolet	General Motors Auctions
42	Kyle Petty	SABCO Racing	Pontiac	Peak Antifreeze
43	Richard Petty	Petty Enterprises	Pontiac	STP
47	Jack Pennington (R)	Close Racing	Oldsmobile	Kanawha Insurance
52	Jimmy Means	Jimmy Means Racing	Pontiac	Alka-Seltzer
57	Jim Bown	Osterlund Racing	Pontiac	Heinz
65	Dave Mader III	Bahre Racing	Pontiac	Jasper Engines & Transmissions
66	Dick Trickle	Cale Yarborough Motorsports	Pontiac	Phillips 66 TropArtic
68	Bobby Hamilton	TriStar Motorsports	Pontiac	Country Time
71	Dave Marcis	Marcis Auto Racing	Chevrolet	Big Apple Market
72	Tracy Leslie	Parker Racing	Oldsmobile	Detroit Gasket
75	Rick Wilson	RahMoc Enterprises	Pontiac	Dinner Bell Foods
79	Bill Ingram	Gray Racing	Oldsmobile	Gray Racing
80	Jimmy Horton	S&H Racing	Chevrolet	Miles Concrete
82	Mark Stahl	Stahl Racing	Ford	Hooters
83	Tommy Ellis	Speed Racing	Chevrolet	Prestone
89	Rodney Combs	Mueller Brothers Racing	Pontiac	Evinrude Outboard Motors
94	Sterling Marlin	Hagan Racing	Oldsmobile	Sunoco
97	Chuck Bown	Tex Racing	Chevrolet	Kellogg's Corn Flakes
98	Rick Mast	Travis Carter Enterprises	Chevrolet	Winn-Dixie

*Replaced by Jim Sauter following first-round qualifying.

== Qualifying ==
Qualifying was split into two rounds. The first round was held on Friday, November 16, at 2:00 PM EST. Each driver would have one lap to set a time. During the first round, the top 20 drivers in the round would be guaranteed a starting spot in the race. If a driver was not able to guarantee a spot in the first round, they had the option to scrub their time from the first round and try and run a faster lap time in a second round qualifying run, held on Saturday, November 17, at 10:30 AM EST. As with the first round, each driver would have one lap to set a time. For this specific race, positions 21-40 would be decided on time, and depending on who needed it, a select amount of positions were given to cars who had not otherwise qualified but were high enough in owner's points; up to two were given.

Rusty Wallace, driving for Blue Max Racing, would win the pole, setting a time of 31.270 and an average speed of 175.222 miles per hour (281.992 km/h) in the first round.

Eight drivers would fail to qualify.

=== Full qualifying results ===
Pos.	#	Driver	Team	Make	Time	Speed
1	27	Rusty Wallace	Blue Max Racing	Pontiac	31.270	175.222
2	11	Geoff Bodine	Junior Johnson & Associates	Ford	31.287	175.127
3	7	Alan Kulwicki	AK Racing	Ford	31.320	174.943
4	28	Davey Allison	Robert Yates Racing	Ford	31.413	174.425
5	17	Darrell Waltrip	Hendrick Motorsports	Chevrolet	31.498	173.954
6	3	Dale Earnhardt	Richard Childress Racing	Chevrolet	31.529	173.783
7	26	Brett Bodine	King Racing	Buick	31.541	173.717
8	4	Ernie Irvan	Morgan–McClure Motorsports	Chevrolet	31.585	173.475
9	9	Bill Elliott	Melling Racing	Ford	31.628	173.239
10	5	Ricky Rudd	Hendrick Motorsports	Chevrolet	31.643	173.157
11	6	Mark Martin	Roush Racing	Ford	31.655	173.091
12	33	Harry Gant	Leo Jackson Motorsports	Oldsmobile	31.657	173.080
13	66	Dick Trickle	Cale Yarborough Motorsports	Pontiac	31.716	172.758
14	25	Ken Schrader	Hendrick Motorsports	Chevrolet	31.745	172.600
15	12	Hut Stricklin	Bobby Allison Motorsports	Buick	31.761	172.513
16	97	Chuck Bown	Tex Racing	Chevrolet	31.761	172.513
17	68	Bobby Hamilton	TriStar Motorsports	Pontiac	31.806	172.269
18	10	Derrike Cope	Whitcomb Racing	Chevrolet	31.817	172.210
19	18	Greg Sacks	Hendrick Motorsports	Chevrolet	31.821	172.188
20	15	Morgan Shepherd	Bud Moore Engineering	Ford	31.835	172.112
Failed to lock in Round 1
21	21	Dale Jarrett	Wood Brothers Racing	Ford	31.655	173.091
22	43	Richard Petty	Petty Enterprises	Pontiac	31.680	172.955
23	20	Steve Grissom	Moroso Racing	Oldsmobile	31.699	172.851
24	1	Terry Labonte	Precision Products Racing	Oldsmobile	31.718	172.747
25	98	Rick Mast	Travis Carter Enterprises	Chevrolet	31.730	172.682
26	2	Ted Musgrave	U.S. Racing	Pontiac	31.802	172.291
27	30	Michael Waltrip	Bahari Racing	Pontiac	31.829	172.145
28	52	Jimmy Means	Jimmy Means Racing	Pontiac	31.859	171.983
29	65	Dave Mader III	Bahre Racing	Pontiac	31.864	171.956
30	42	Kyle Petty	SABCO Racing	Pontiac	31.866	171.945
31	8	Bobby Hillin Jr.	Stavola Brothers Racing	Buick	31.926	171.622
32	47	Jack Pennington (R)	Close Racing	Oldsmobile	31.936	171.568
33	29	Pancho Carter	Romine Racing	Ford	31.945	171.520
34	75	Rick Wilson	RahMoc Enterprises	Oldsmobile	31.963	171.423
35	94	Sterling Marlin	Hagan Racing	Oldsmobile	31.991	171.273
36	71	Dave Marcis	Marcis Auto Racing	Chevrolet	32.016	171.139
37	19	Chad Little	Little Racing	Ford	32.023	171.102
38	89	Rodney Combs	Mueller Brothers Racing	Pontiac	32.093	170.729
39	0	Jim Sauter	H. L. Waters Racing	Ford	32.101	170.686
40	80	Jimmy Horton	S&H Racing	Chevrolet	32.131	170.527
Provisional
41	57	Jim Bown	Osterlund Racing	Pontiac	-	-
Failed to qualify
42	82	Mark Stahl	Stahl Racing	Ford	-*	-*
43	35	Bill Venturini	Venturini Motorsports	Chevrolet	-*	-*
44	36	H. B. Bailey	Bailey Racing	Pontiac	-*	-*
45	41	Larry Pearson	Larry Hedrick Motorsports	Chevrolet	-*	-*
46	72	Tracy Leslie	Parker Racing	Oldsmobile	-*	-*
47	79	Bill Ingram	Gray Racing	Oldsmobile	-*	-*
48	04	Bill Meacham	Meacham Racing	Oldsmobile	-*	-*
49	83	Tommy Ellis	Speed Racing	Chevrolet	-*	-*
Official first round qualifying results
Official starting lineup

== Race results ==
Fin	St	#	Driver	Team	Make	Laps	Led	Status	Pts	Winnings
1	20	15	Morgan Shepherd	Bud Moore Engineering	Ford	328	64	running	180	$62,250
2	2	11	Geoff Bodine	Junior Johnson & Associates	Ford	328	46	running	175	$40,850
3	6	3	Dale Earnhardt	Richard Childress Racing	Chevrolet	328	42	running	170	$26,700
4	21	21	Dale Jarrett	Wood Brothers Racing	Ford	328	0	running	160	$17,225
5	5	17	Darrell Waltrip	Hendrick Motorsports	Chevrolet	327	35	running	160	$22,300
6	11	6	Mark Martin	Roush Racing	Ford	327	0	running	150	$14,700
7	8	4	Ernie Irvan	Morgan–McClure Motorsports	Chevrolet	327	0	running	146	$11,200
8	3	7	Alan Kulwicki	AK Racing	Ford	327	2	running	147	$10,650
9	1	27	Rusty Wallace	Blue Max Racing	Pontiac	327	30	running	143	$20,700
10	19	18	Greg Sacks	Hendrick Motorsports	Chevrolet	326	0	running	134	$7,625
11	14	25	Ken Schrader	Hendrick Motorsports	Chevrolet	326	0	running	130	$11,750
12	18	10	Derrike Cope	Whitcomb Racing	Chevrolet	326	2	running	132	$9,550
13	15	12	Hut Stricklin	Bobby Allison Motorsports	Buick	326	0	running	124	$6,450
14	27	30	Michael Waltrip	Bahari Racing	Pontiac	326	0	running	121	$7,850
15	9	9	Bill Elliott	Melling Racing	Ford	326	94	running	128	$37,800
16	10	5	Ricky Rudd	Hendrick Motorsports	Chevrolet	325	0	running	115	$7,550
17	22	43	Richard Petty	Petty Enterprises	Pontiac	324	0	running	112	$5,650
18	7	26	Brett Bodine	King Racing	Buick	323	0	running	109	$7,250
19	12	33	Harry Gant	Leo Jackson Motorsports	Oldsmobile	323	0	running	106	$10,850
20	29	65	Dave Mader III	Bahre Racing	Pontiac	323	0	running	103	$4,525
21	24	1	Terry Labonte	Precision Products Racing	Oldsmobile	323	0	running	100	$6,650
22	31	8	Bobby Hillin Jr.	Stavola Brothers Racing	Buick	323	0	running	97	$6,475
23	16	97	Chuck Bown	Tex Racing	Chevrolet	322	0	running	94	$3,400
24	23	20	Steve Grissom	Moroso Racing	Oldsmobile	322	0	running	91	$4,275
25	4	28	Davey Allison	Robert Yates Racing	Ford	321	13	running	93	$16,450
26	26	2	Ted Musgrave	U.S. Racing	Pontiac	319	0	running	85	$5,225
27	37	19	Chad Little	Little Racing	Ford	318	0	running	82	$3,200
28	28	52	Jimmy Means	Jimmy Means Racing	Pontiac	316	0	running	79	$4,025
29	25	98	Rick Mast	Travis Carter Enterprises	Chevrolet	316	0	running	76	$3,600
30	38	89	Rodney Combs	Mueller Brothers Racing	Pontiac	315	0	running	73	$3,125
31	39	0	Jim Sauter	H. L. Waters Racing	Ford	310	0	engine	70	$3,050
32	33	29	Pancho Carter	Romine Racing	Ford	298	0	accident	67	$3,040
33	34	75	Rick Wilson	RahMoc Enterprises	Oldsmobile	291	0	accident	64	$5,705
34	36	71	Dave Marcis	Marcis Auto Racing	Chevrolet	267	0	engine	61	$5,700
35	40	80	Jimmy Horton	S&H Racing	Chevrolet	234	0	rear end	58	$3,000
36	32	47	Jack Pennington (R)	Close Racing	Oldsmobile	228	0	engine	55	$3,490
37	13	66	Dick Trickle	Cale Yarborough Motorsports	Pontiac	167	0	engine	52	$6,600
38	35	94	Sterling Marlin	Hagan Racing	Oldsmobile	132	0	steering	49	$5,560
39	41	57	Jim Bown	Osterlund Racing	Pontiac	56	0	accident	46	$3,530
40	17	68	Bobby Hamilton	TriStar Motorsports	Pontiac	28	0	engine	43	$2,925
41	30	42	Kyle Petty	SABCO Racing	Pontiac	12	0	engine	40	$9,925
Failed to qualify
42		82	Mark Stahl	Stahl Racing	Ford					
43		35	Bill Venturini	Venturini Motorsports	Chevrolet					
44		36	H. B. Bailey	Bailey Racing	Pontiac					
45		41	Larry Pearson	Larry Hedrick Motorsports	Chevrolet					
46		72	Tracy Leslie	Parker Racing	Oldsmobile					
47		79	Bill Ingram	Gray Racing	Oldsmobile					
48		04	Bill Meacham	Meacham Racing	Oldsmobile					
49		83	Tommy Ellis	Speed Racing	Chevrolet					
Official race results

== Standings after the race ==
Drivers' Championship standings

	Pos	Driver	Points
	1	Dale Earnhardt	4,430
	2	Mark Martin	4,404 (-26)
1	3	Geoff Bodine	4,017 (-413)
1	4	Bill Elliott	3,999 (–431)
1	5	Morgan Shepherd	3,689 (–741)
1	6	Rusty Wallace	3,676 (–754)
	7	Ricky Rudd	3,601 (–829)
1	8	Alan Kulwicki	3,599 (–831)
1	9	Ernie Irvan	3,593 (–837)
1	10	Ken Schrader	3,572 (–858)
Official driver's standings

- Note: Only the first 10 positions are included for the driver standings.

Previous race: 1990 Checker 500	NASCAR Winston Cup Series; 1990 season	Next race: 1991 Daytona 500
