= Down East (disambiguation) =

Down East is a term for parts of eastern New England and Canada's Maritime Provinces.

Down East may also refer to:

- Down East (magazine), a monthly magazine in Maine
- Down-East Village Restaurant & Motel, the oldest motel in Maine at the time of its demolition
- Down East (North Carolina), a region of coastal North Carolina
- Down East Books, a publishing imprint of Rowman & Littlefield
- Down East Yachts, a former American sailboat manufacturer
- Down East fiddling, a type of Canadian fiddling
- Downeast Airlines, a former commuter airline based in Rockland, Maine, from 1960 to June 1, 2007

== See also ==
- Down Easter (disambiguation)
- East Down (disambiguation)
- Way Down East (disambiguation)
