= Log Cabin Motel =

Log Cabin Motel may refer to:

- Log Cabin Motel (Gallup, New Mexico), formerly listed on the National Register of Historic Places in McKinley County, New Mexico
- Log Cabin Motel (Pinedale, Wyoming), listed on the National Register of Historic Places in Sublette County, Wyoming
