= Safari Motel =

- Interactive map of the Safari Motel area

General information
- Location: 2001 E Fremont Street, Las Vegas, Nevada, United States
- Coordinates: 36.16149709045781°N 115.12239748516018°W
- Opened: 1954
- Closed: 2017

Other information
- Number of rooms: 25

The Safari Motel opened at 2001 East Fremont Street, Las Vegas, Nevada, in 1954. The establishment closed down in 2017 after facing health violations, as well as years of relentless criminal activity such as various violent crimes and drug use, and was converted to homeless housing at a cost of $40,000.

== See also ==
- List of motels
