= Red Carpet Inn =

Hotel chain

- Industry: Hotel/Motel Chain
- Founded: 1969; 56 years ago
- Founder: Bill Harwood; Tommy Tucker
- Fate: Merged with Scottish Inns in 1985
- Successor: Hospitality International

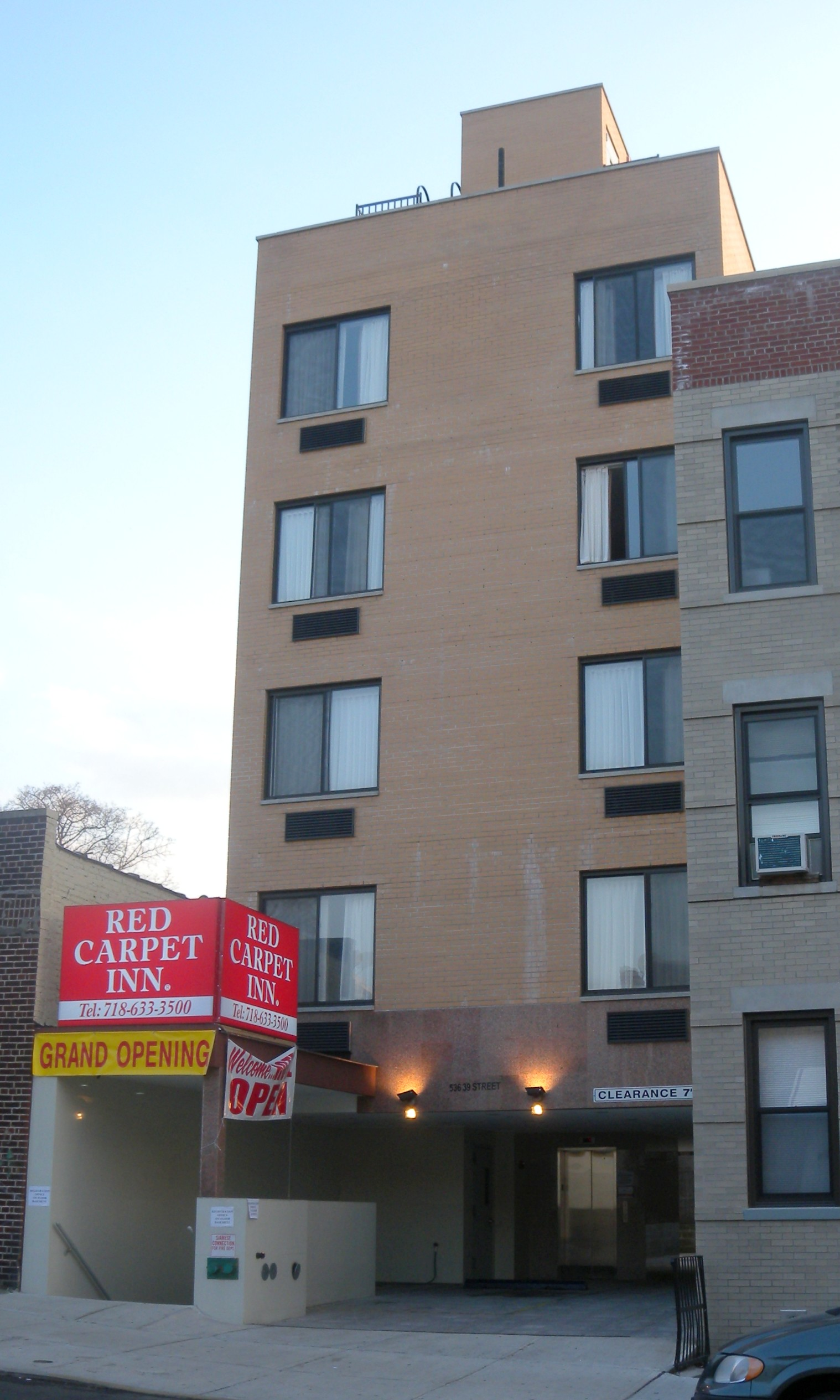
Sunset Park, Brooklyn

Red Carpet Inn is a chain of hotels and motels, with locations in the United States and Bahamas. Red Carpet Inn Brands are part of the Hospitality International system and are individually owned and operated.

== History ==
In the late 1960s, Red Carpet Inns International, Inc., a Colorado corporation, acquired the Master Hosts Inns and Red Carpet Inn trademarks from Red Carpet Inns, Inc. In the summer of 1969, Tommy Tucker (one of the original founders of Quality Courts United, now known as Quality Inns), and Bill Harwood started Red Carpet Inns of America, Inc. In May 1972, Red Carpet Inns of America was headquartered in Daytona Beach, Florida.

In 1973, Red Carpet Inns of America, Inc. published a Travel Directory for its Master Hosts Inns and Red Carpet Inns and offered ‘instant’ reservations through a toll-free telephone number, referred to the “American Express Space Bank, one of the largest, fastest and best reservation systems in the world”. There were 57 Red Carpet Inn properties listed, some in key cities and popular attraction areas such as Tucson, Arizona; Little Rock, Arkansas; Denver, Colorado; Daytona Beach, Jacksonville and Orlando, Florida; Atlanta and Savannah, Georgia; Knoxville and Pigeon Forge, Tennessee; Houston, Texas; Richmond, Staunton, Virginia Beach and Williamsburg, Virginia.

Ownership changed around 1978, with Red Carpet Inns International’s headquarters being moved to Atlanta, Georgia. In 1980, Red Carpet Inns International published its International Travel Directory, listing 99 properties flying either the Red Carpet Inn or Master Hosts Inns flags, with 30 U.S. locations, throughout Canada and in Monterrey, Mexico. Football great, Johnny Unitas is also a spokesman for the company during this time period.

Red Carpet Inn merged with Scottish Inns in 1985 to form Hospitality International. It continues as a Hospitality International brand.

== See also ==
- List of motels
