= Lazy A Motel =

- U.S. National Register of Historic Places
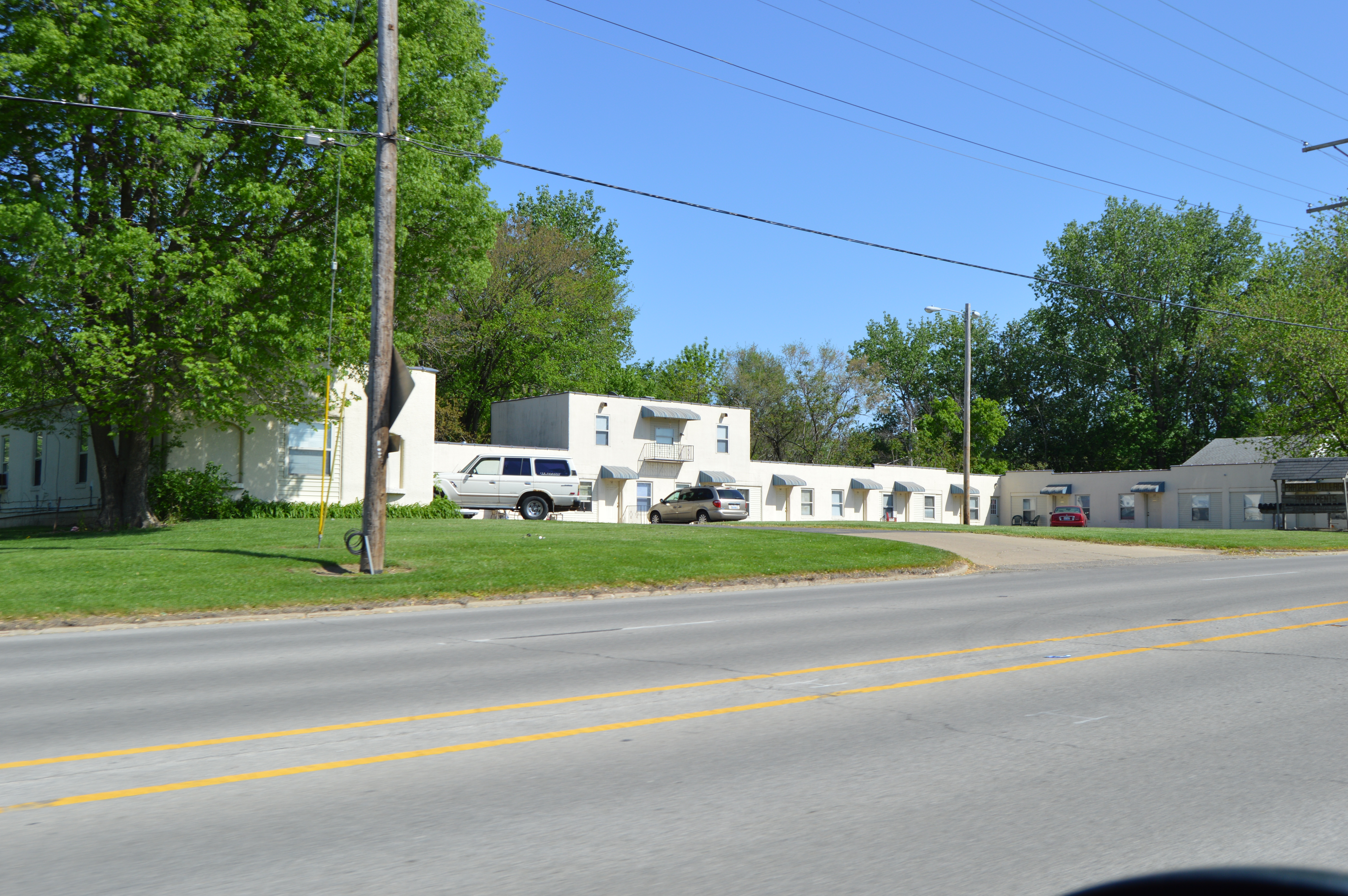

- Location within Illinois Location within the United States
- Nearest city: Springfield, Illinois
- Coordinates: 39°50′21″N 89°37′59″W
- Area: 2 acres (0.81 ha)
- Built: 1948–49
- Architectural style: Southwest Vernacular
- NRHP reference No.: 94001268
- Added to NRHP: November 8, 1994

The Lazy A Motel is a historic former motel located along Old U.S. Route 66 in Springfield, Illinois. The motel was built in 1948–49 and had 13 rooms arranged in a U shape, with garages located between the rooms. The building was designed in the Southwestern Vernacular style, which can be seen in its stucco walls, its flat tile roof, and its cast iron railings and fixtures. The motel was one of many mom and pop motels built along US 66; however, it was one of only two dozen such motels remaining in Illinois as of 1994. Since the motel's closure, the building has been used for apartments. The motel was added to the National Register of Historic Places on November 8, 1994.

== See also ==
- List of motels
