= Blue Gables Motel =

- U.S. National Register of Historic Places
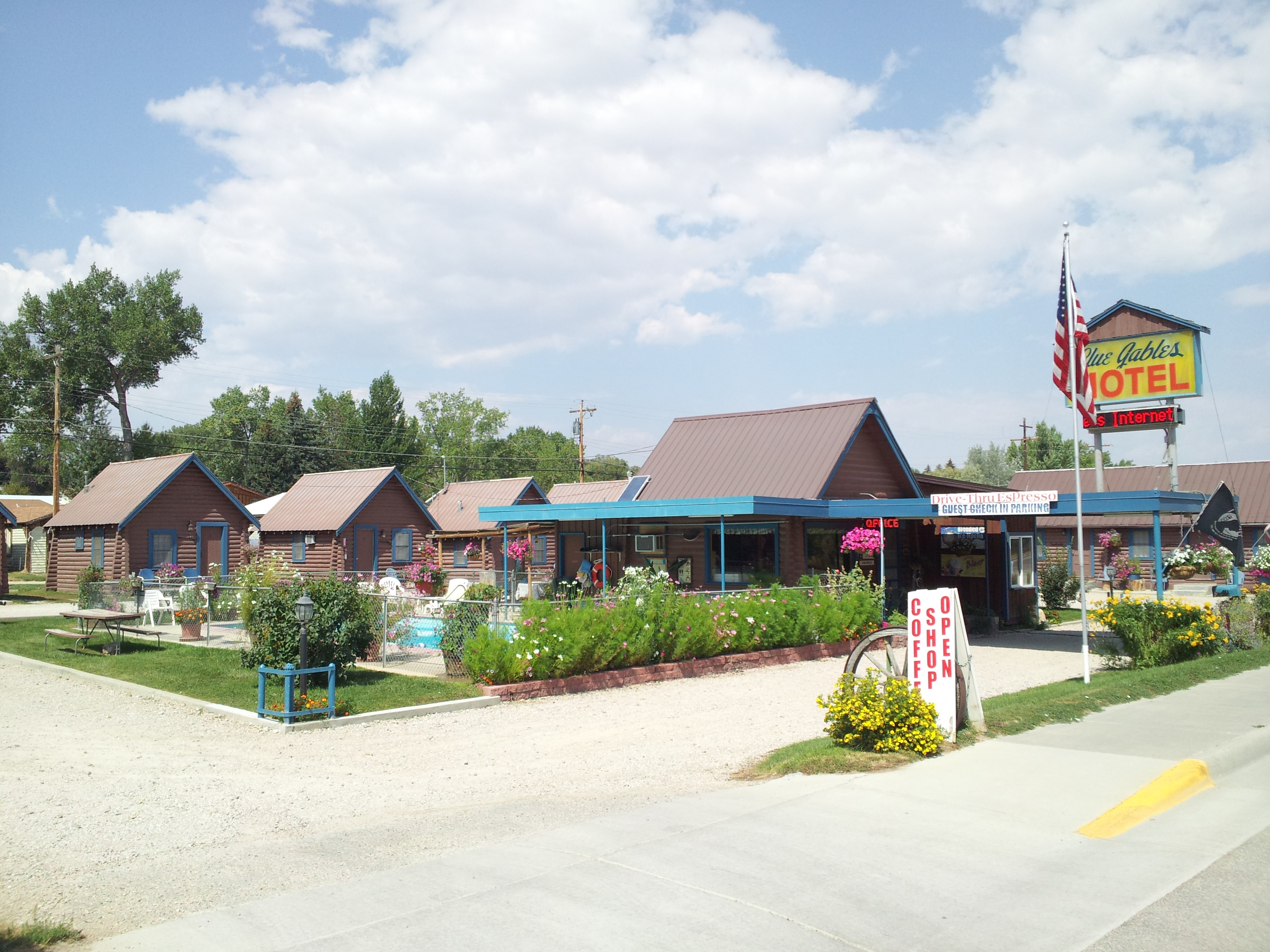

- Location within Wyoming Location within the United States
- Location: 662 N. Main St., Buffalo, Wyoming
- Coordinates: 44°21′20″N 106°41′56″W
- MPS: Motor Courts and Motels in Wyoming MPS
- NRHP reference No.: 11000772
- Added to NRHP: November 1, 2011

The Blue Gables Motel, formerly known as Blue Gables Court, in Buffalo, Wyoming is a motel that was placed on the National Register of Historic Places in 2011 as part of a Multiple Property Submission devoted to historic motor courts and motels in Wyoming.

Most of the motel's guest accommodation consists of 17 small log cabins. The motel includes an area for tent camping and a two-bedroom house available for rental. It began operation in 1939.

== See also ==
- List of motels
