= Vagabond Inn =

US chain of hotels and motels

Vagabond Inn Corporation
- Product type: Hotel
- Current owner: Vista Investments
- Country: United States
- Introduced: 1958
- Previous owners: Vagabond Motor Hotel Inc.
- Website: https://www.vagabondinn.com

The Vagabond Inn is an upper-end economy and mid-priced chain of hotels and motels located on the West Coast of the United States. The Vagabond Inn brand is franchised by Vagabond Inn Corporation of El Segundo, California. Today, there are more than 30 Vagabond Inn locations in Arizona, California, Nevada, Oregon, and Texas. The hotels are generally located in busy markets near popular tourist destinations, major attractions, major cities, and airports, ranging in size from 25 to 200 guestrooms.

In 2020, the city of Oxnard, California purchased a local Vagabond Inn to be transferred into apartments for the city's unhoused population. In 2024 the City of Long Beach launched a $2.4 million pilot project at a 60-room Vagabond Inn in the city to house unhoused people.

In 2025, the company launched a new website to further enhance the guest experience.

== See also ==
- List of hotels
- List of motels
