= Way Down East (disambiguation) =

Way Down East is a 1920 film directed by D. W. Griffiths and starring Lillian Gish.

Way Down East may also refer to:

- Way Down East (1935 film), directed by Henry King
- Way Down East (play), of 1898 by Charlotte Blair Parker

== See also ==
- Down East (disambiguation)
