= Cross Country Inn =

American motel chain

- Industry: Hotels
- Founded: Columbus, Ohio 1988
- Defunct: 2005
- Fate: defunct
- Area served: United States
- Key people: Don Kenney (founder)
- Services: Lodging

Cross Country Inn was an American motel chain founded in 1988 by Don Kenney. It had more than 30 locations in the Midwestern United States at its peak. Families often stayed at Cross Country Inns because of their combination indoor/outdoor pools.

In 2003, Kenney sold the chain's assets. The last of the motels was sold in 2005.

== See also ==
- List of motels
