= Heilman Villas =

- U.S. National Register of Historic Places
- U.S. Historic district
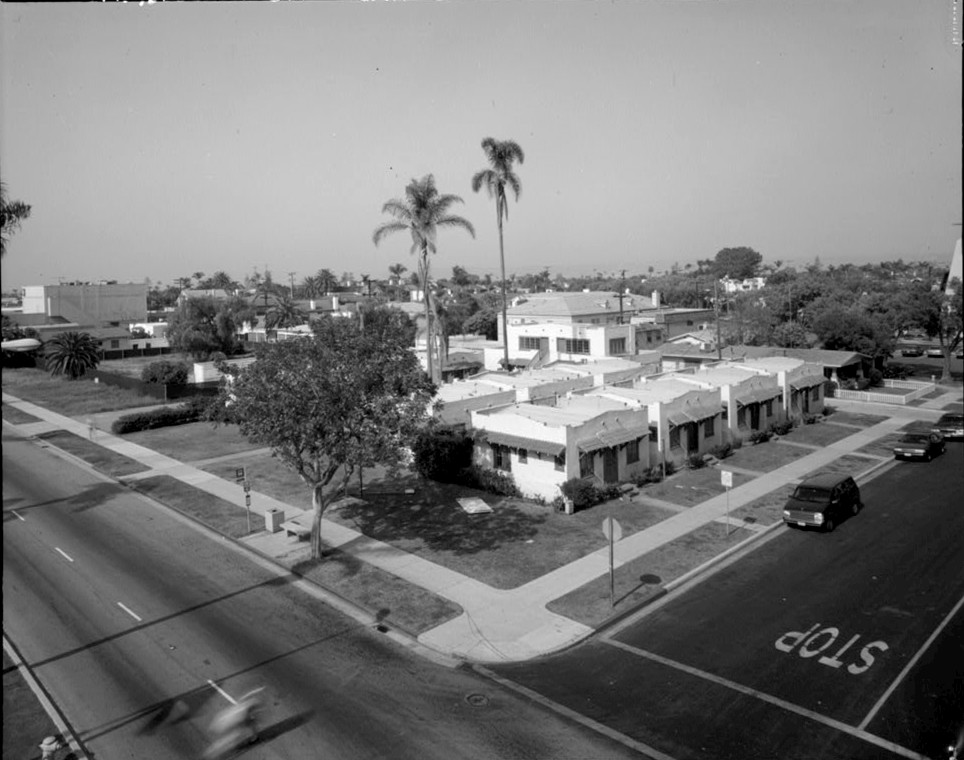
- Heilman Villas in Coronado, Calif.

- Location within San Diego Location within San Diego County, California Location within California Location within the United States
- Location: 1060, 1070, 1080, 1090 Seventh St. and 706--720 (even nos.) Orange Ave., Coronado, California
- Coordinates: 32°41′24″N 117°10′37″W
- Area: 4 acres (1.6 ha)
- Built: 1922
- Architect: Robert Hellman
- Architectural style: Mission/Spanish Revival, Spanish Colonial Revival
- NRHP reference No.: 92000319
- Added to NRHP: April 08, 1992

The Heilman Villas are historic buildings located at the corner of Seventh Street and Orange Avenue in Coronado, California, United States. They consist of 10 standalone bungalows and one 2-story duplex. The duplex and 6 of the bungalows face a central courtyard which faces Orange Ave. The other 4 bungalows face 7th St.

The Heilman Villas complex was built for Robert and Lillian Heilman. Later the complex was known as DeCoby Court and Hollander Court. In 1952, it became the Coromar Motel. In 1973, the City of Coronado bought the site; it was used by community groups such as the Chamber of Commerce and the Coronado Historical Association (CHA). The City renamed the complex again, this time to Babcock Court, in honor of City of Coronado founder Elisha S. Babcock.

Heilman Villas were placed on the National Register of Historic Places in 1992 as examples of 1920s bungalow court architecture in the Mission Revival style. The interiors contain Craftsman elements with hardwood floors and leaded glass.

The Coronado Police Department is now located on the former site of the Heilman Villas.

== See also ==
- List of motels
