= Down Easter =

Down Easter or Downeaster may refer to:

- Down Easter (ship), or Downeaster, a type of 19th-century sailing ship
- Downeaster (train), an Amtrak passenger train from Boston, Massachusetts, to Brunswick, Maine
- Down Easter group of trains, a passenger train of the United States, 1927–1942 and 1949–1950
- a person from Down East, parts of eastern coastal New England and Canada
- Downeaster, or Bay breeze, a cocktail drink

== See also ==
- Down East (disambiguation)
- "The Downeaster 'Alexa' ", a 1990 song by Billy Joel
