= David Kong =

- Occupation: Hotelier
- Known for: CEO of Best Western International

David Kong was the CEO of Best Western International until he retired in December 2021.

== Early life and education ==
He was born and raised in Hong Kong. He has a bachelor's degree in Business Administration from the University of Hawaii, and he also completed the Executive Development program at the Kellogg Graduate School of Management at Northwestern University.

== Career ==
He worked in the hotel industry as a bus boy and worked his way up to become CEO of Best Western International in 2004. Prior to Best Western, Kong worked in management for other hospitality brands and KPMG Consulting's Hospitality and Realty practice. In 2010, Best Western introduced a descriptor program under his leadership defining hotels as Best Western, Best Western Plus or Best Western Premier. According to Travel Weekly, approximately 40 percent of North American properties meet the Best Western Plus criteria. According to the same article, Kong has also focused on international development, primarily in Asia and the Middle East.

Prior to joining Best Western, Kong worked for hospitality brands, including Hyatt, Omni, Hilton International and Regent International. Kong also work for KPMG's Consulting Real Estate and Hospitality practice.

In 2010, Kong served as Chairman of the American Hotel and Lodging Association (AH&LA). He was also appointed and served on the United States Travel and Tourism Advisory Board.

== Recognition ==
In 2012, Kong received the AH&LA Lawson Odde Award. In 2013, he received the Stephen W. Brener Lodging Hospitality Silver Plate Award. In June 2022, he was identified by the International Hospitality Institute as one of the Global 100 in Hospitalit, a list featuring the 100 Most Powerful People in Global Hospitality.
