= East Down =

East Down may refer to:

- East Down, Devon, a village in England
- The eastern part of County Down in Northern Ireland
- East Down (Northern Ireland Parliament constituency)
- East Down (UK Parliament constituency), former constituency in County Down, Northern Ireland

== See also ==
- Down East (disambiguation)
