= M. K. Guertin =

M.K. Guertin
- Born: January 18, 1891; Liberty, Texas, U.S.
- Died: April 14, 1970 (aged 79); Long Beach, California, U.S.
- Occupation: Hotelier
- Known for: Founder of Best Western Hotels

Merile Key (M.K.) Guertin (January 18, 1891 – April 14, 1970) was the founder of Best Western and was known in the hospitality industry as Mr. Motel.

== Biography ==
=== Early life ===
M.K. Guertin was born on January 18, 1891, on a farm in Liberty, Texas, northeast of Houston. He worked on the family farm and as an apprentice in the printing trade.

He was the son of Louis Gédéon Guertin (1844–1918), a native of Beloeil and the youngest of the 18 children of Noël Guertin (1792–1864) and Marie-Josepte Brodeur (1798–1880).

=== Career ===
He left Texas for California in 1923 where he began working on marketing efforts for his sister who owned multiple hotels in Long Beach, California.

He was involved in the creation of the Southern California Auto Court Association and the California Auto Court Association in 1925. He purchased the Cherry Motor Court in Long Beach in 1933, and in 1938 purchased the Beach Motel, which would become the first Best Western property. Over time he built or owned 13 motels in California.

In 1946 he started an association of independently owned hotels to refer business to each other, which was the beginning of Best Western. While taking a trip from his hotel to Tacoma, Washington, Guertin recorded the names and locations of motels less than a gas tank apart from each other. He used the information collected to create a guide provided to the growing number of interstate travelers on trips. Members were initially recruited by Guertin who sought varied hotels from small roadside motor courts to urban hotels as long as the owners agreed to adhere to the association's high standards of quality and service. Over time, this referral program grew into Best Western, the world's largest hotel chain.

He was inducted into the Hospitality Industry's Hall of Honor at the Hilton College of Hotel and Restaurant Management posthumously in 2009 for his many contributions to the industry. At the time of induction David Kong, President and CEO of Best Western, said: "M.K. understood that, while product is important, the essence of hospitality lies in service experience." Guertin was known as "Mr. Motel" to a generation of owners who were involved in building Best Western. Under Best Western's ownership model, each hotel is independently owned and operated, and the brand supports hotels with marketing and supply support. Best Western is now a global hotel brand with 4,200 hotels in more than 100 countries.
