= Referral chain =

Type of hotel franchise

A referral hotel chain is a type of hotel franchise. It is a type of hotel that operates independently but maintains affiliation with a given chain. To stay within the chain, the hotel must meet certain minimum criteria.

== History ==
The referral chain in lodging began in the early 1930s, promoting the cabins and tourist courts which were the predecessors to the standardised motel architecture of the 1950s.

Often, motel owners would organize "referral chains" in which each member lodge would voluntarily meet a set of standards and each property would promote the others. Each property would display the group's name alongside its own; a printed directory of all member locations would generally be freely distributed at each member hotel or motel.

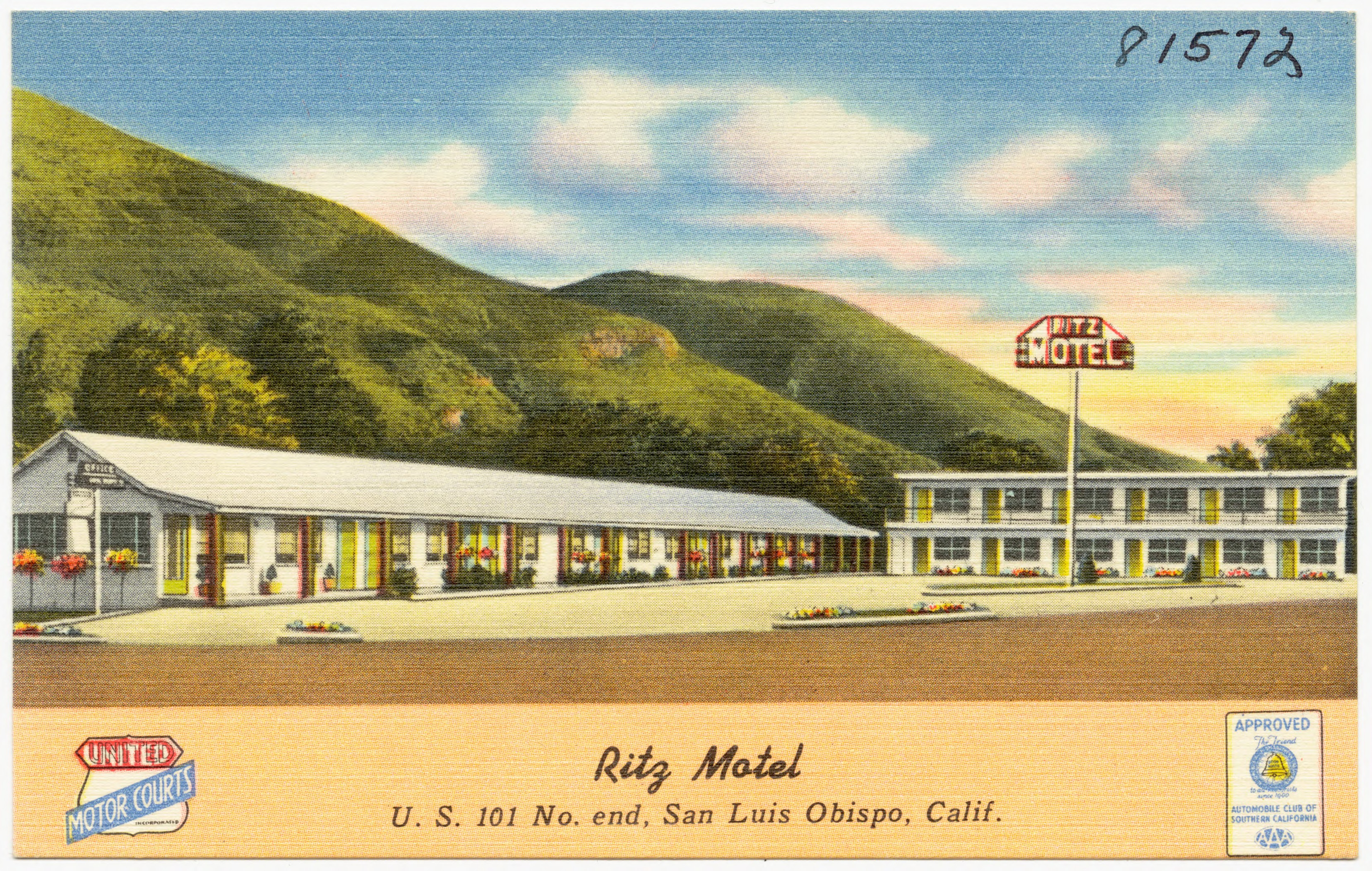
Motel postcard displaying the United Motor Courts badge

United Motor Courts, founded 1933 by a group of motel owners in the southwestern US, published a guidebook until the early 1950s; those who met its standards advertised its name on their signs and motel postcards. A splinter of this group established Quality Courts United (1939, forty motels in the eastern US) because of difficulties in removing existing properties from the large and inclusive United Motor Courts network when they failed to upgrade and modernize. The Best Western Motels (1947) was founded as a similar referral chain of independent western US motels.

Other referral chains included "Superior Courts United" (1950, renamed "A Superior Motel" in 1964, last membership renewals 1979) whose four-leaf clover logo ("Travel Superior Courts United Inc. And Be Sure!") graced over 500 motels (mostly on the Atlantic coast) in the mid-1960s.

Quality Courts was converted to a franchise operation in 1963, ending a long-running cross-promotion in which Best Western (a western US referral chain) and Quality Courts (originally an eastern US referral chain) were largely marketed together. The brand still exists as franchised Quality Inn, which is a brand division of Choice Hotels.

Friendship Inns (founded 1961 Salt Lake City, became a franchise chain in 1985) once enlisted many older, marginal properties; its trademark was eventually sold as a low-end brand to Choice Hotels. Other 1950s and 1960s referral chains included Emmons Walker, Congress Inns, Imperial 400 Motels, Master Hosts, and Courtesy Courts. Budget Host (1976, 57 locations) and Independent Motels of America (1982) were among the last of this dying breed.

By 1987, franchise chains controlled 64 percent of the market and independent referral chains were being converted to franchises or disappearing.

== Current status ==
The one notable survivor of the referral chains, Best Western, offers the centralized purchasing and reservation systems of a franchise system but nominally remains member-owned.

While the function of referral chains may have declined in the USA, it has not done so in Europe, where the hotel market has a historically larger share of independent and family-owned properties compared to North America. Best Western have expanded into Europe, where they are competing with European referral chains, more commonly marketing themselves as "brands", such as the expanding Logis chain of independently owned hotels (formerly Logis de France), and other chains in France, Britain, Spain and other parts of Europe.

Independent hotels traditionally accounted for well over half of the hotels in Europe, unlike North America where chains have long dominated the market. While the proportion of chain hotels in Europe is constantly on the rise, the survival and indeed fight-back of the independent hotels sector is dependent on the use and development of referral chains or brands.

== See also ==
- Retail cooperative
