= Hospitality International =

North American hotel chain

Hospitality International, Inc.
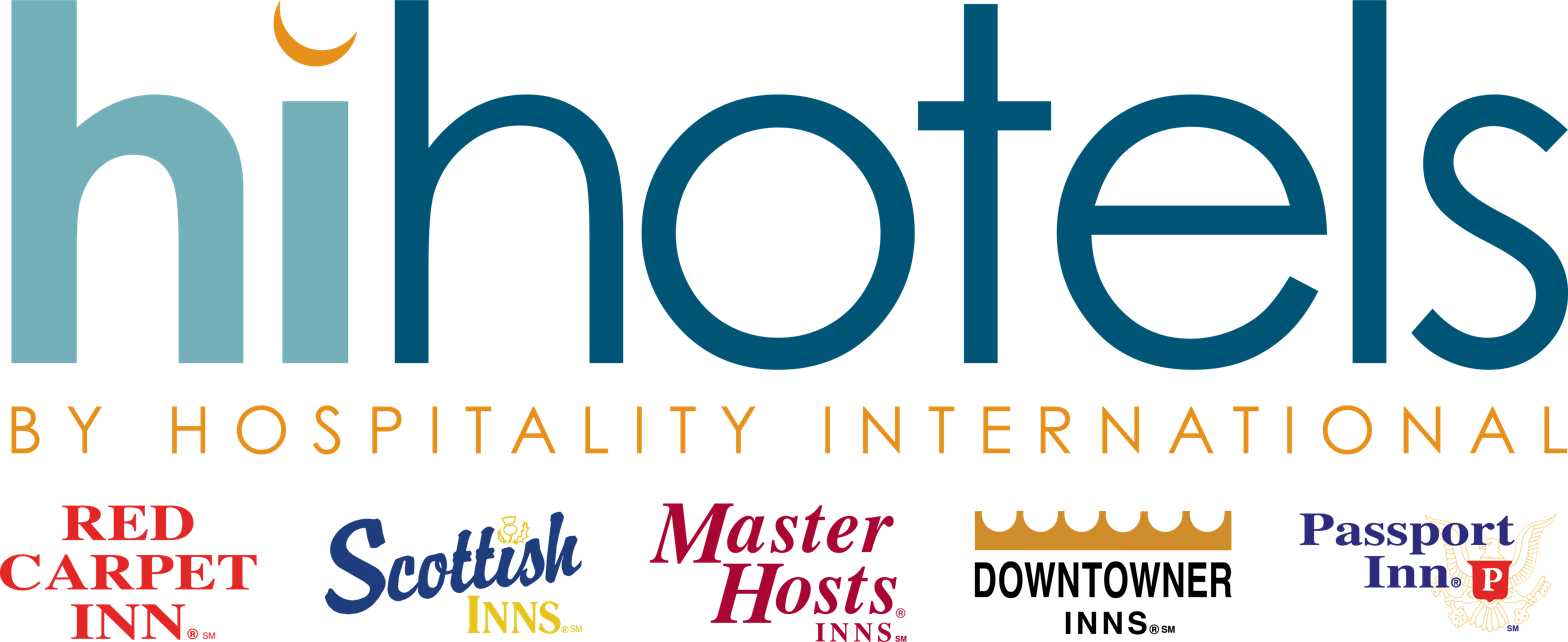
- Brand Logo for hihotels
- Company type: Franchise
- Founded: 1985
- Headquarters: Tucker, Georgia, United States
- Number of locations: 243 (United States and Canada)
- Services: Lodging

Hospitality International is a chain of hotels and motels in the United States and Canada. Their brands include Red Carpet Inn and Scottish Inns.

== History ==
Hospitality International was founded in 1985 when the Red Carpet Inn and Scottish Inns chains merged. It was first headquartered in Biloxi, Mississippi before moving to Tucker, Georgia.

== Brands ==
- Downtowner Inns, a limited-service brand with four locations
- Master Host Inns, a mix of hotels and resorts with four locations
- Passport Inns, a limited-service brand with 14 locations
- Red Carpet Inn, a mix of limited and full-service properties with 108 locations
- Scottish Inns, a limited-service brand with 113 locations

== Loyalty program ==
The "INNCentive Card" offers guests a 15% discount on all stays at participating Hospitality International properties.
