= El Rey Inn =

Historic motor court hotel in Santa Fe, New Mexico

El Rey Court
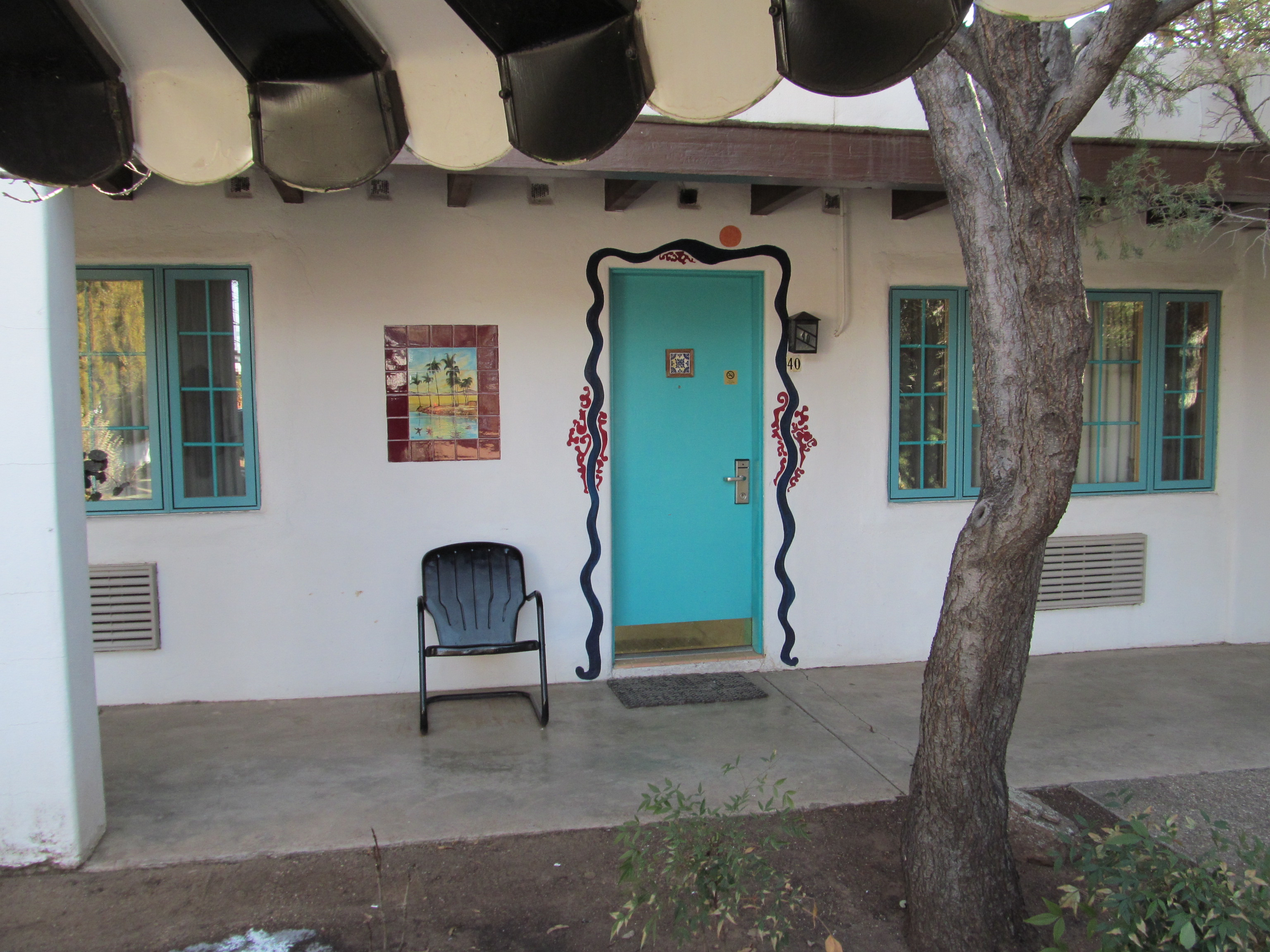
- Room 40 at the El Rey Inn
- Interactive map of the El Rey Court area

General information
- Location: Santa Fe, New Mexico, 1862 Cerrillos Road
- Coordinates: 35.66443°N 105.97346°W
- Opening: 1936
- Owner: Terrell White

Other information
- Number of rooms: 86 (originally 12)

Website
- elreycourt.com

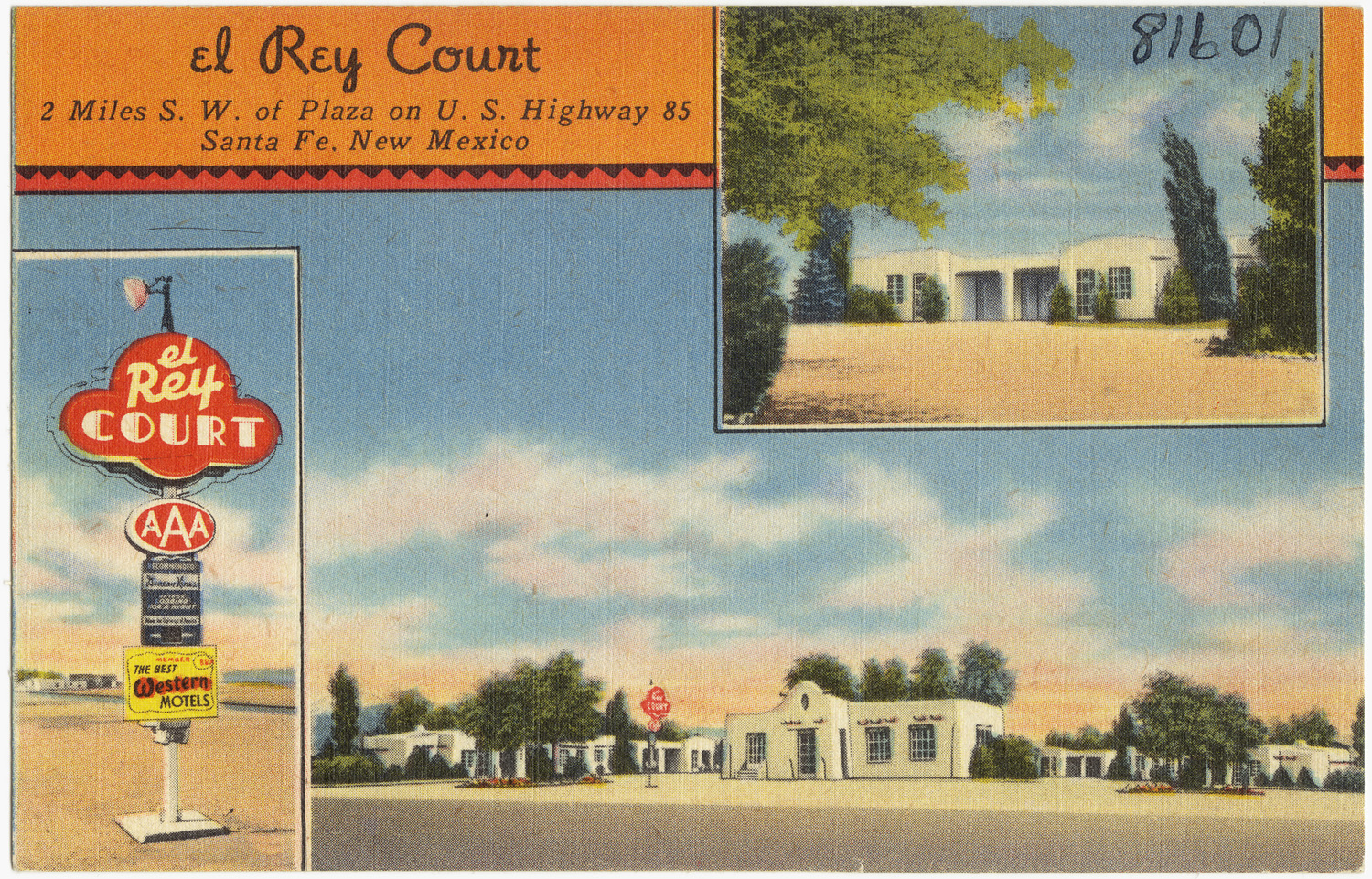
El Rey Court

The El Rey Court (formerly known as the El Rey Inn) is located at 1862 Cerrillos Road in Santa Fe, New Mexico, United States. This campus spans 5 acres and is located near what used to be Route 66. The property includes traditional adobe style buildings surrounded by gardens.

== History ==
When El Rey Court was opened in 1936, it only had 12 rooms. The hotel was built in traditional Northern New Mexico adobe style. The hotel's developer was also responsible for constructing another hotel named El Vado which is located an hour south in Albuquerque, New Mexico. Although these two hotels were built by the same developer, they have never shared the same owner.

In 1936, both of these properties were located on the original U.S. Route 66. In 1937 the New Mexico State Legislature removed the US 66 designation from the original 1926 road through Santa Fe, sending traffic onto a bypass road (constructed in Arthur T. Hannett's final days as state governor) which ran as a straight line from Santa Rosa to Albuquerque. This would shorten US 66 by ninety miles but removed the state capital from the route entirely. Ultimately, Interstate 40 construction would also bypass Santa Fe.

During the 1950s, El Rey began a planned expansion in which the owner added rooms and enclosed the carports to become rooms for guests. A swimming pool was constructed in the 1950s which helped El Rey compete with newer hotels that were being constructed in Santa Fe.

In 1973, Terrell White purchased El Rey Inn, then 38 rooms on three dusty acres, for $550,000. He faced the tourism and travel challenges posed by the 1973 oil crisis. White also renovated the hotel by replacing all of the hotel's old gas and sewer pipes.

New rooms were added to the hotel in 1977, 1980 and 1983 A profit-sharing plan made investments on behalf of the inn's longtime workers. In 1993, White constructed the two-story, 10-room Spanish Colonial courtyard. This addition was influenced by the style and architecture of inns in France. In the 1990s the hotel became known as El Rey Inn rather than El Rey Court.

Another round of expansion began in 1994 when the Whites purchased a neighboring property (the Alamo Lodge). This expansion resulted in the construction of 21 new rooms. This latest addition to the hotel includes walkways flanked by gardens, a sauna, and a whirlpool with a handcrafted fireplace (add reference). During 2005, one of these courtyards became "El Agua" which functioned as a fitness room for guests of the hotel.

In 2016, the current owning partners, Jeff Burns, Matt Comfort, and Jay & Alison Carroll purchased the property. They renamed it The El Rey Court, and renovated the property in 2018 by adding hot tubs, changing the breakfast area to a mezcal bar, and other improvements.

El Rey Court currently has 86 rooms and suites. According to Fodor's, each room is unique, and is decorated with Southwestern furniture and antiques.

== See also ==
- List of hotels
- List of motels
