= Williams Deluxe Cabins =

- U.S. National Register of Historic Places
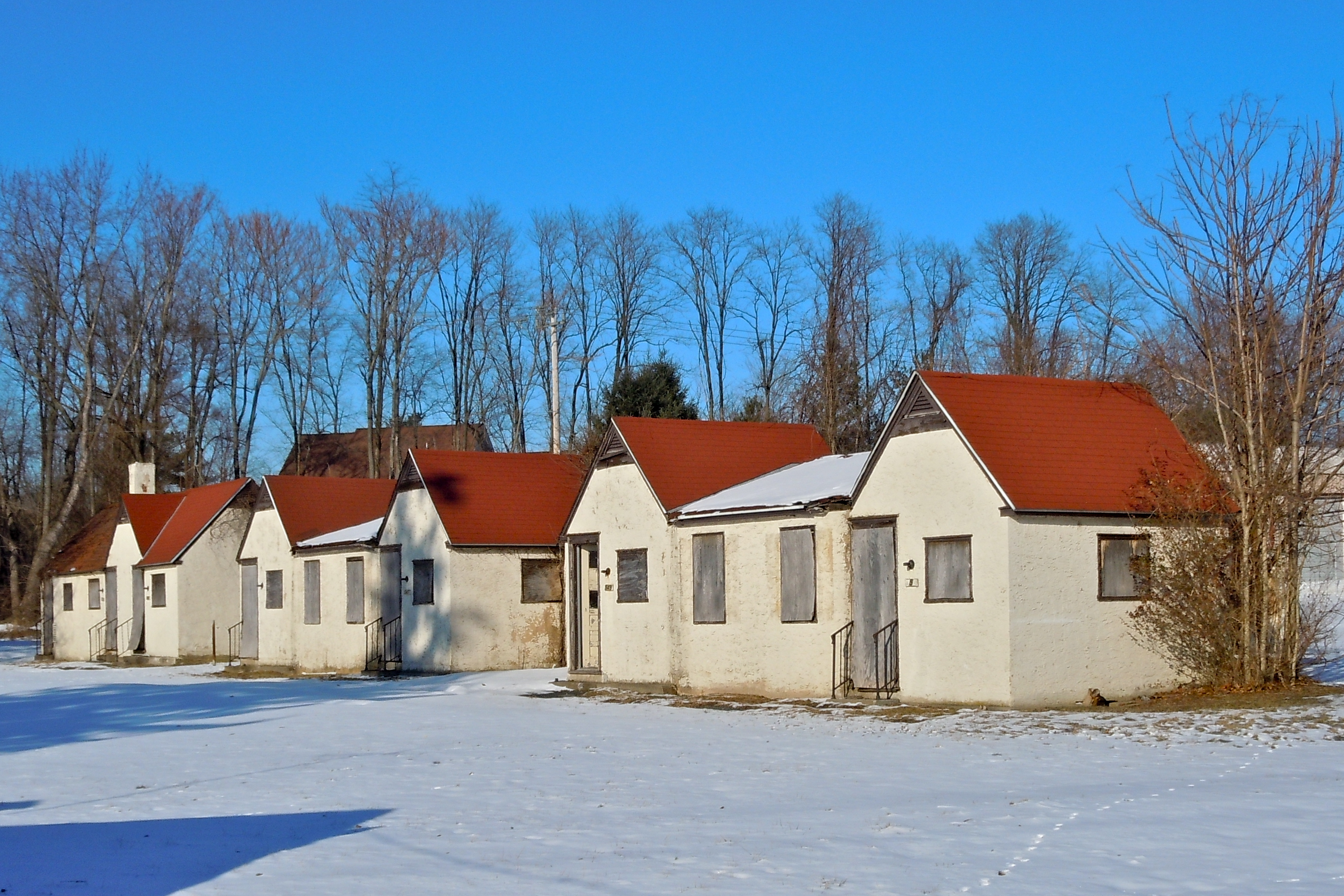
- Williams Deluxe Cabins, January 2011

- Location within Pennsylvania Location within the United States
- Location: Lincoln Hwy., West Whiteland Township, Pennsylvania
- Coordinates: 40°01′47.01″N 75°36′55.88″W
- Area: 1.5 acres (0.61 ha)
- Built: 1937
- Built by: Williams, Leon M.
- Architectural style: Tudor Revival
- MPS: West Whiteland Township MRA
- NRHP reference No.: 88001165
- Added to NRHP: July 28, 1988

The Williams Deluxe Cabins are part of an historic motel complex that is located in West Whiteland Township, Chester County, Pennsylvania.

This property was listed on the National Register of Historic Places in 1988.

== History and architectural features ==
Built in 1937, this complex includes four contributing buildings. They are a service station and motel office, a house, and two multiple rental units. The buildings have Tudor Revival design influences, including half-timbering and rough-faced stucco finish. The service station is a 1 1/2-story, T-shaped building with a steeply pitched cross gable roof. It is linked to the office by a one-story breezeway.

This property is also referred to as Icabod's Plaza or Icabod's News.

== See also ==
- List of motels
