= Thunderbird Motel =

American Indian-themed motel

Coordinates: 44.8606923°N 93.2407491°W

Thunderbird Motel logo

The Thunderbird Motel was an American Indian-themed motel that was built in 1962 along Interstate 494 and 24th Ave., in Bloomington, Minnesota, a suburb of Minneapolis. It is an example of post-war American culture. Prior to its demolition, it was part of the Ramada franchise.

== History ==
The motel was built at a time of rapid expansion in the area of south metropolitan Minneapolis. It was designed by Rodney Wallace and was the first hotel in Bloomington to hold a liquor license. Interstate 494 had just been constructed, and the area was growing. With the construction of Metropolitan Stadium in 1955, and the moving of the Washington Senators to Minnesota by Calvin Griffith in 1961, the motel was primed to handle city and suburban business, as well as airport travelers. According to the 1964 Minnesota Twins program, the Thunderbird Motel is "Just a Home Run From Metropolitan Stadium," and featured Dick Clausen at the piano and organ.

The motel competed primarily with the Holiday Inn, with its famous Great Sign, which was erected in 1961 at the intersection of Interstate 494 and 34th Ave. S, one mile (1.6 km) east of the Thunderbird. It stands to this day, although significantly altered. The Thunderbird also competed with the Howard Johnson motel and restaurant, which was the first of its kind in Minnesota, built in 1963 at the corner of Interstate 494 and Mn 100, five miles (8 km) west of the Thunderbird. It was demolished in the year 2000.

The Thunderbird's fortunes changed when the sports teams moved downtown, and after several changes in ownership, by late 2005, it was purchased by Ramada and operated as the Ramada MSP. In March 2016, Bloomington Port Authority purchased the motel to sell it to the Mall of America for their expansion plans. The Thunderbird was demolished in late 2016, and plans continued through 2018 to determine the usage for the property.

== Design ==
The exterior of the Thunderbird was notable for its post-war architecture, including faux stone, tall white columns, and colorful brick. The exterior featured several examples of the Thunderbird logo, most notably on its famous sign, which had stood since its opening. It featured two arrows criss-crossing the sign, with the logo at the top and the marquee below. Standing adjacent to the sign and just as tall was a synthetic totem pole, with many characters and levels. Both signs stood facing Interstate 494. The exterior also featured a giant fiberglass statue of an Indian, hand raised in salute. There was also a smaller metallic Indian statue and a cannon. The grounds of the motel also had a unique outdoor pool featuring the Thunderbird logo, which was surrounded by the motel on all sides. Both statues were removed in the early spring of 2006, and as of November 2006 the exterior signs bore the Mall of America logo in place of the old Thunderbird logo.

The inside of the motel featured many common architectural trends of the 1960s, with a suspended ceiling, can lighting, and faux stone. The motel, however, was known for being somewhat of a museum and featured numerous genuine and artificial Indian artifacts and unique light fixtures that looked like teepees but actually acted as lights. The many artifacts included a stuffed wolf, tomahawks, and pictures. When Wallace sold the Thunderbird, most of the artifacts were donated to the University of Minnesota-Duluth's Tweed Museum.

The motel also featured "The Hall of Tribes," a mini museum with several rooms dedicated to different tribes, including the Winnebago, the Miami, and the Dakota.

=== Convention Center ===
The Thunderbird featured a 32,000 sq ft (3,000 m^{2}) convention center which included three large halls that at times could be divided into smaller rooms by the way of automatic and manual airwalls. Each of the individual rooms were named after Native American tribes. For example, the largest room ("Hall of Tribes") included rooms named "Chippewa," "Cherokee," "Navajo," and "Pawnee." Another banquet hall could be divided into the "East Menomonie", "West Menomonie," and "Miami" rooms (the combination of which makes up "The 3 'M's"). The third banquet hall could be split into three rooms named "Shoshone," "Winnebago," and "Yakima."

== See also ==
- List of motels
