= Budget Host =

American motel chain

- Industry: Hospitality
- Founded: 1975
- Founder: Ray Sawyer; Ed Semmler
- Number of locations: 150+
- Area served: United States
- Services: Lodging

Budget Host is an American lodging chain.

== Overview ==
It was founded in 1975 in Fort Worth, Texas by Ray Sawyer - who died in 2007 - and Ed Semmler. Unlike most motel chains, it uses a referral chain, thus allowing independent motel operators to use the name. As of 2024, Budget Host maintains over 150 locations throughout 37 U. S. states.

== See also ==
- List of motels
