= Best Western =

International hotel chain

- Type: Subsidiary
- Industry: Hotels
- Founded: 1946; 80 years ago
- Headquarters: Phoenix, Arizona, U.S.
- Number of locations: 4,700 (worldwide)
- Area served: Worldwide
- Key people: M. K. Guertin, founder; Larry Cuculic (CEO)
- Revenue: US$247,000,000 (2019)
- Number of employees: 1,254 (2012)
- Parent: BWH Hotel Group
- Website: www.bestwestern.com
- Footnotes; Data from Hoover's factsheet

Best Western International, Inc. owns the Best Western Hotels & Resorts brand, which it licenses to over 4,500 hotels worldwide. The franchise, with its corporate headquarters in Phoenix, Arizona, includes more than 2,000 hotels in North America. The brand was founded by M. K. Guertin in 1946. As of December 2021, Larry Cuculic is the president and CEO of Best Western. As of 2018, it was a nonprofit owned by its franchisee members.

In 1964, Canadian hotel owners joined the system. Best Western then expanded to Mexico, Australia, and New Zealand in 1976.

In 2002, Best Western International launched Best Western Premier in Europe and Asia. (The other hotels in the chain were known as Best Western.) In 2011, the chain's branding system-wide changed to a three-tiered system: Best Western, Best Western Plus, and Best Western Premier.

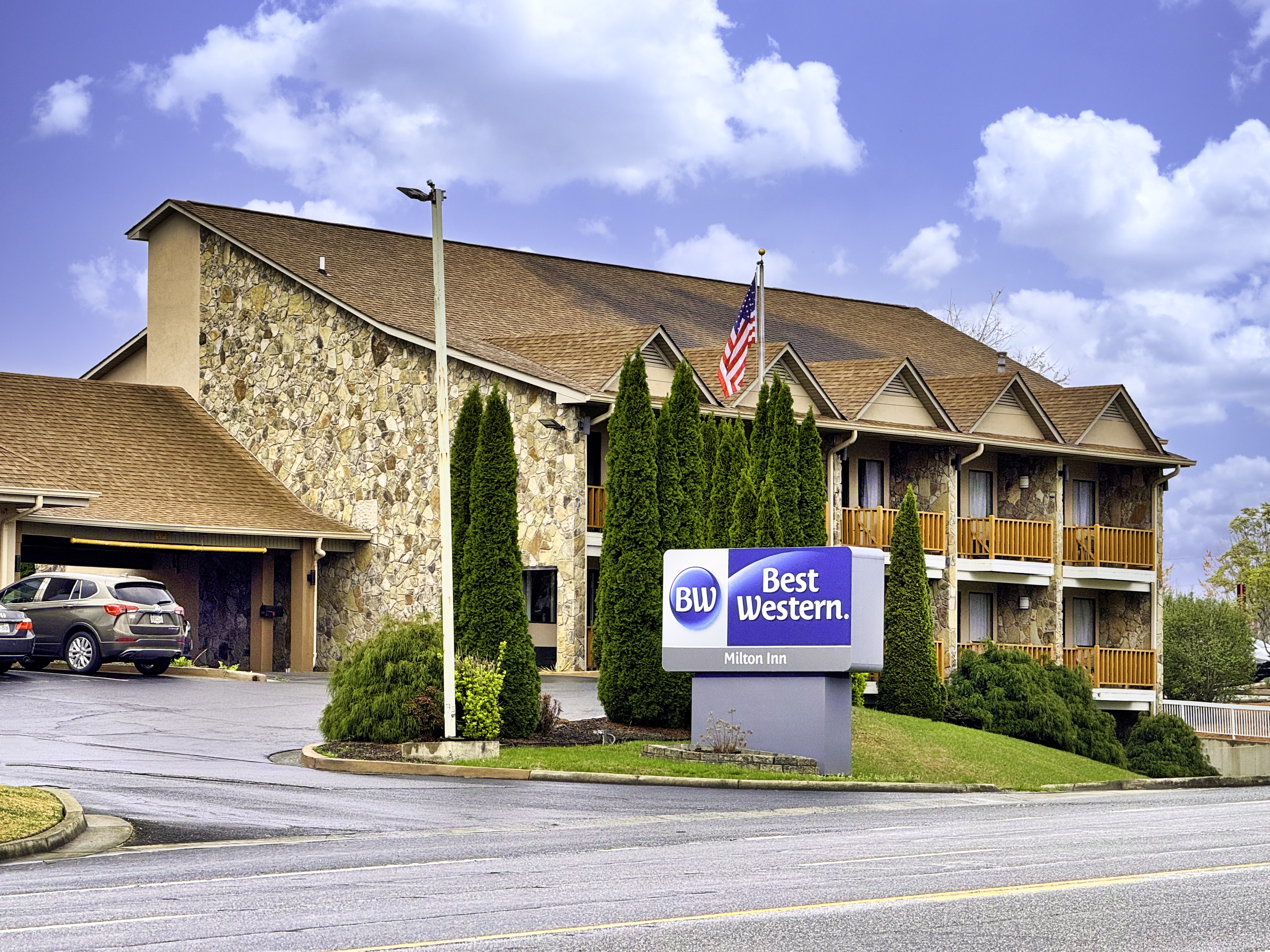
Best Western in Blairsville, Georgia

== History ==
Best Western began in the years following World War II as Best Western Motels. At the time, most hotels were either large urban properties or smaller family-owned roadside hotels and motels. In California, a network of independent hotel operators began making referrals of each other to travelers. This "referral system" consisted of phone calls between one desk operator and another. This small and informal network eventually grew into the modern Best Western motel/hotel brand founded by M.K. Guertin in 1946.

The name "Best Western" originated from the fact that most of the chain's original operators were west of the Mississippi River in the United States. By 1962 Best Western had the only hospitality reservations service covering the entire United States, and in 1963, was the largest motel brand in the industry with 699 member properties and 35,201 rooms. From 1946 to 1964 Best Western had a marketing partnership with Quality Courts, the forerunner of the chain known today as Quality Inns, whose properties were located mostly east of the Mississippi River, and thus not in direct competition with Best Western. This partnership made sense geographically, but was not successful in the long run, and was eventually abandoned. In 1964 Best Western launched an expansion effort of its own operations east of the Mississippi under the name "Best Eastern" for those properties with the same typeset and Gold Crown logo as "Best Western." By 1967 the "Best Eastern" name was dropped and all motels from coast-to-coast got the "Best Western" name and Gold Crown, a move that would further enhance an already successful marketing brand into the "World's Largest Hotel Chain" by the 1970s.

Best Western's "Gold Crown" logo was introduced in 1964 and would continue with a few minor revisions over the next 32 years, until it was replaced by a blue and yellow logo in 1996. In 2015, Best Western introduced a new family of logos, replacing the core logo and adding signage for Best Western Plus and Best Western Premier.

Best Western purchased WorldHotels in February 2019 adding approximately 360 additional hotels and 81,248 more rooms to its brand. BWH Hotel Group was formed as the parent company of Best Western and WorldHotels following this acquisition.

=== Legal dispute ===
Best Western used to call itself a cooperative membership association and, as such, could be seen as a co-op. Around 1985, it abandoned the "cooperative" terminology after courts insisted on calling it a franchisor despite its nonprofit status. In Quist v. Best Western Int'l, Inc., 354 N.W.2d 656 (N.D. 1984), in which the North Dakota Supreme Court decided that Best Western was a franchisor and had to comply with the appropriate laws and regulations.

=== Best Western GB ===
Best Western GB began in 1978 when Interchange Hotels of the United Kingdom, consisting of independent hoteliers from key locations in the UK, elected to trade under the brand name Best Western United Kingdom, becoming an affiliate of Best Western International in the US. The brand has over 250 locations in the United Kingdom.

=== Best Western Australia and New Zealand ===
In 1981, Homestead Motor Inns of Australia affiliated with Best Western. This move put 'International' after the Best Western name. The company has since been known as Best Western International.

In early 2007, Best Western Australia took over the rights to operate Best Western properties in New Zealand from the previous company, the Motel Federation of New Zealand. Currently, Best Western Australia has 205 properties in the group (11 in New Zealand and 194 in Australia).

=== Best Western Myanmar (Burma) ===
On 21 May 2013, Best Western International announced that it would take over management of the Green Hill Hotel in Yangon, Myanmar. The acquisition gave the Best Western brand a presence in Myanmar (Burma) as its first hotel establishment in the country.

== Corporate design ==
Logo used from 1996 to 2015

As of August 2023, BWH Hotels has 19 brands and logos. Since 1948 the Best Western logo has had approximately 13 modifications to the main brand logo, with the last brand logo change made in 2015. In 2010, Best Western divided the brand into 3 descriptors.

After this division, the logo stayed the same, but the descriptors of Plus and Premier were added, and all hotels were either Best Western, Best Western Plus, or Best Western Premier. In 2015, a complete overhaul of the Best Western logo resulted in a very different logo from the previous years, with the most notable change being the removal of the crown, which had been a part of the logo since 1962.

Since 2014, the brand has created 12 additional brands, for a total of 15 brands with distinctive logos. The Best Western website has a picture of all of their past logos in their "timeline and story" section. Best Western also owns (acquired in February 2019) the WorldHotels Collection which includes 4 additional brands, whose logos are all the same, except for the addition of the distinguishing descriptors of Luxury, Elite, Distinctive, and Crafted.

== Brands ==
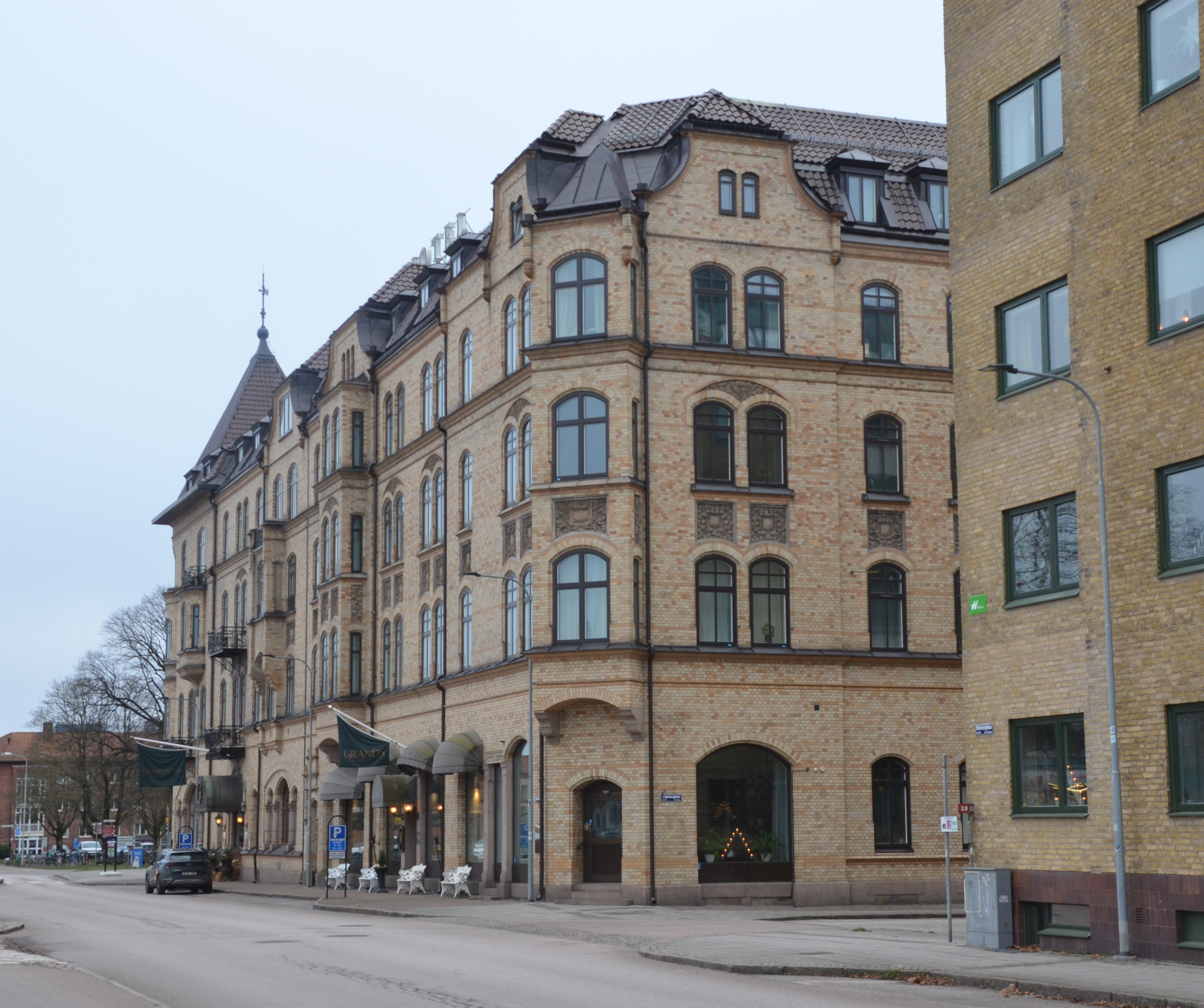
Best Western Plus Grand Hotel in Halmstad

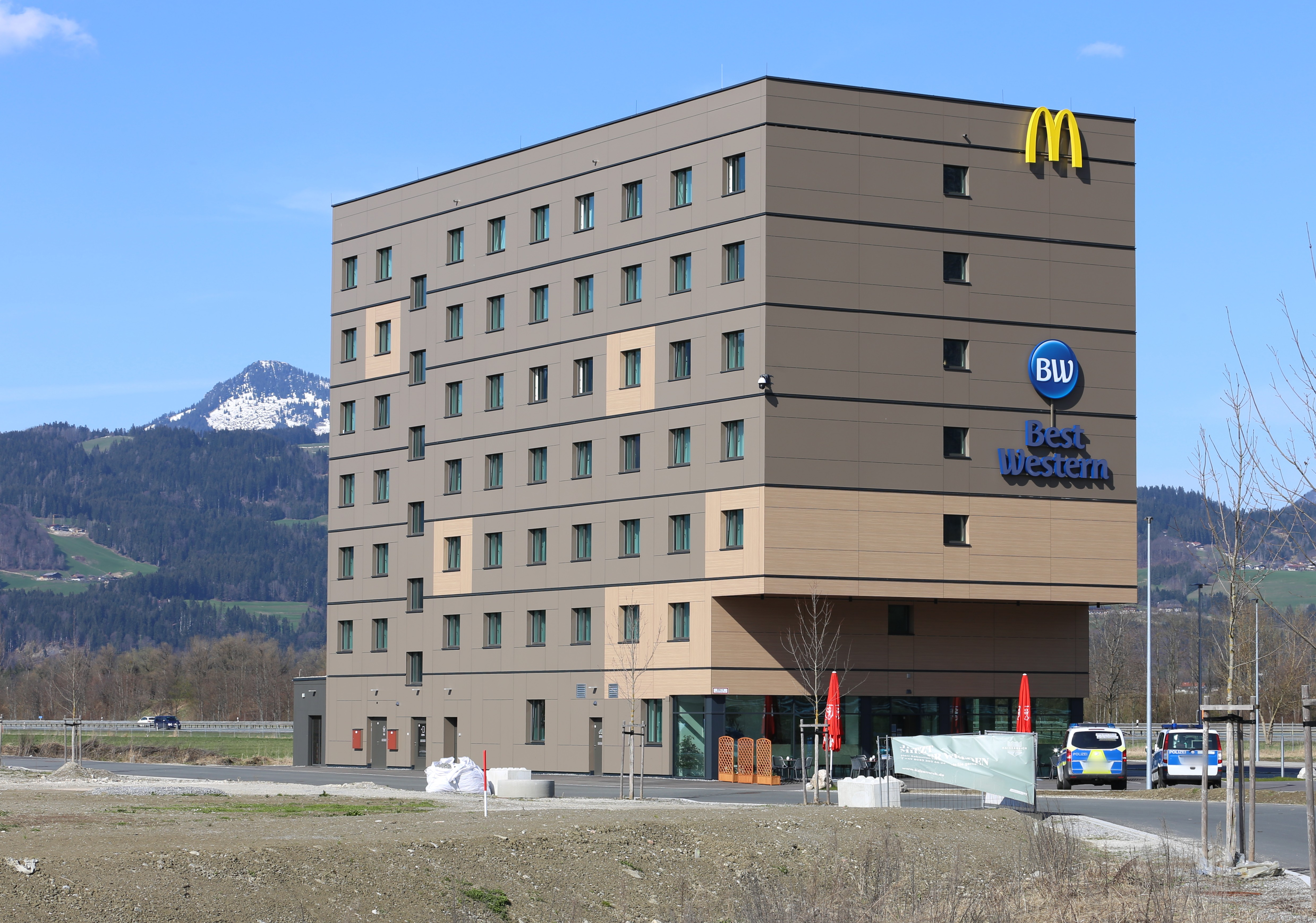
Best Western in Kiefersfelden

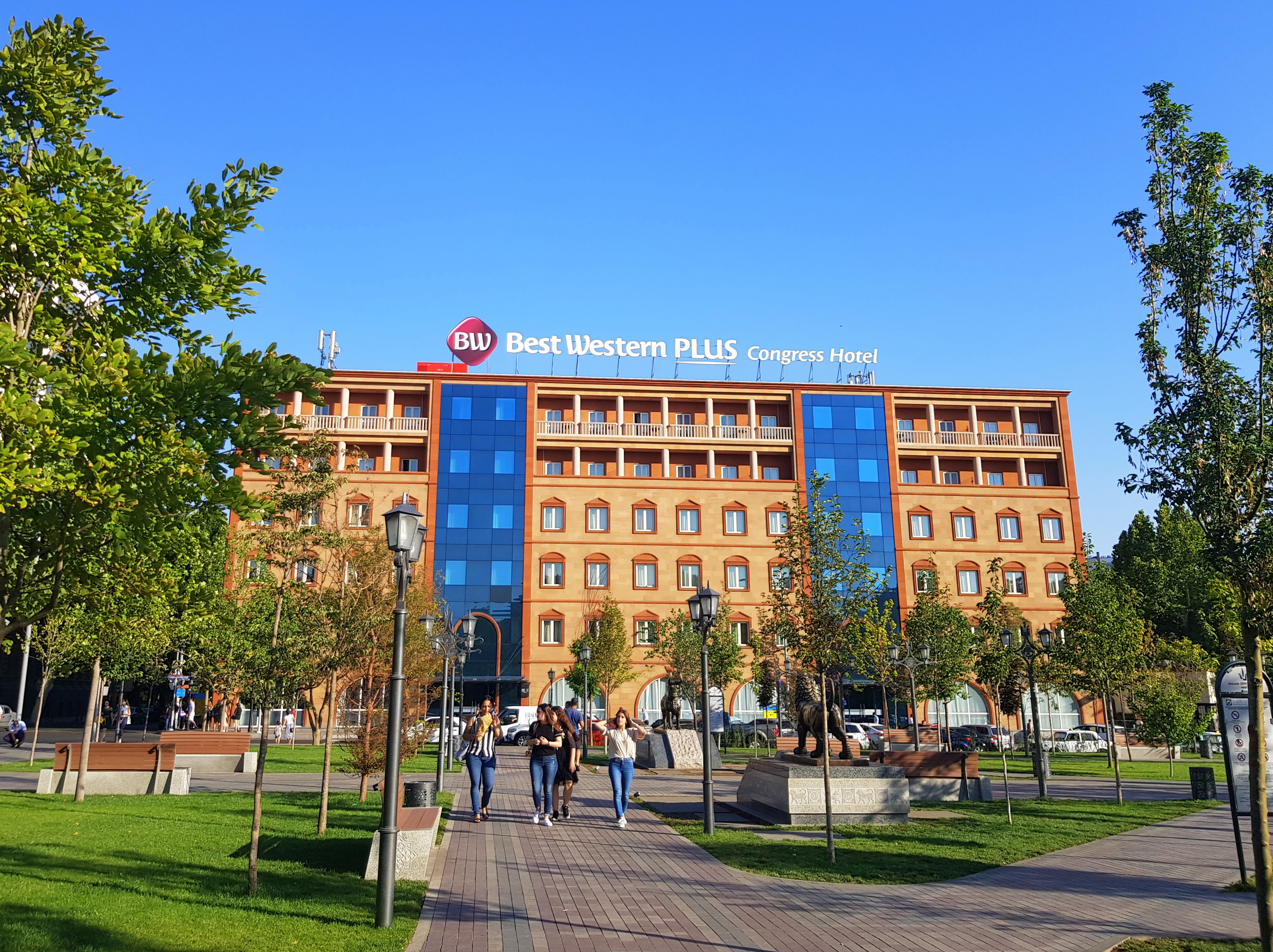
Best Western Plus in Yerevan

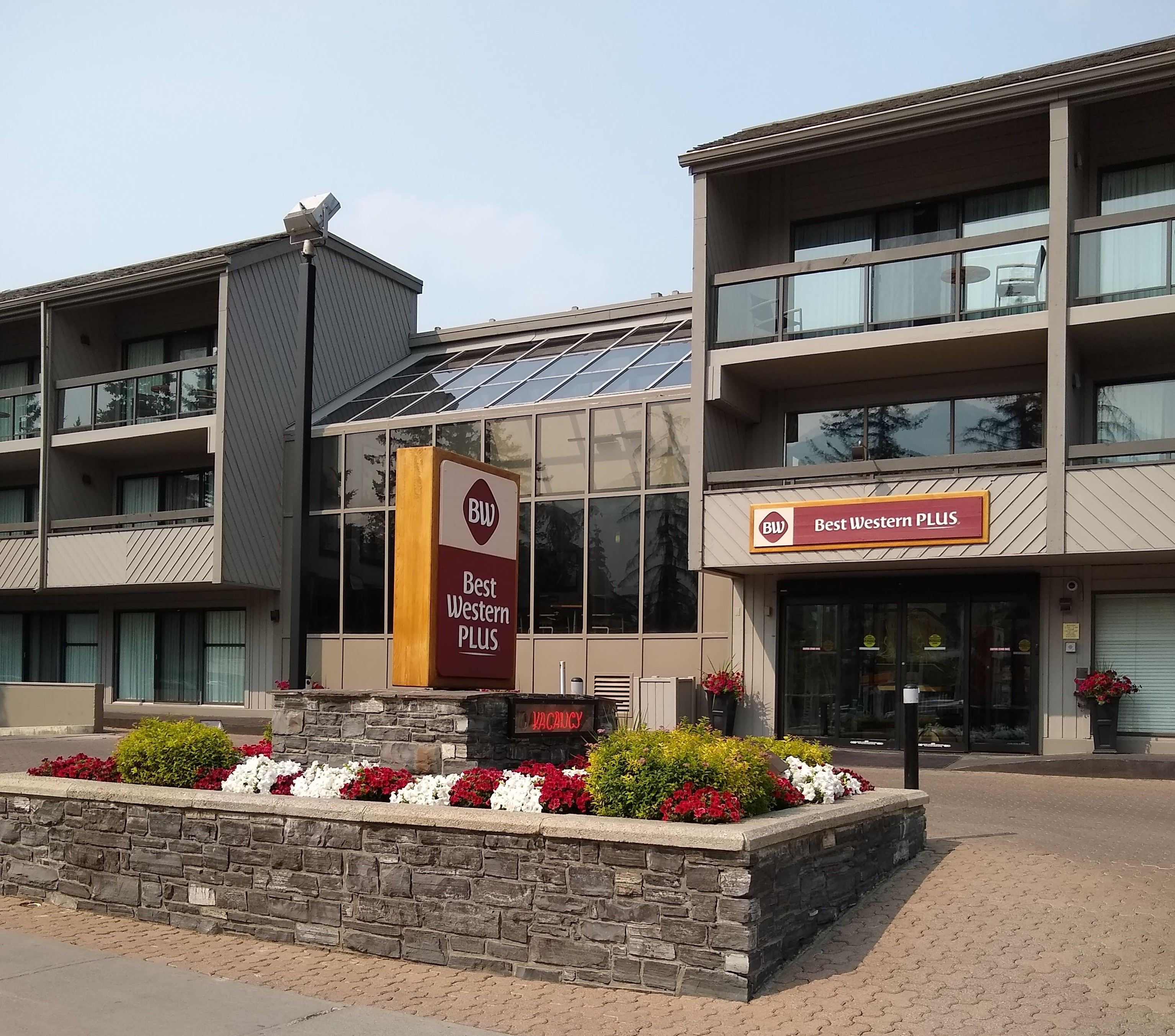
Best Western Plus in Banff, Alberta

Best Western operates the following 19 brands in six different categories:

=== Aspirational ===
- WorldHotels Luxury
- WorldHotels Elite
- WorldHotels Distinctive
- WorldHotels Crafted

=== Collection ===
- BW Signature Collection
- BW Premier Collection

=== Boutique ===
- Vīb
- Sadie by Best Western
- Aiden by Best Western

=== Timeless ===
- Best Western Premier
- Best Western Plus
- Best Western Hotel & Resorts
- Glō

=== Value ===
- SureStay
- SureStay Plus
- SureStay Collection

=== Extended Stay ===
- Executive Residency by Best Western
- @HOME by BWH
- SureStay Studio

== See also ==
- List of hotels
- List of motels
