= List of motels =

This is a list of motels. A motel is lodging designed for motorists, and usually has a parking area for motor vehicles. Entering dictionaries after World War II, the word motel, coined in 1925 as a portmanteau of motor and hotel or motorists' hotel, referred initially to a type of hotel consisting of a single building of connected rooms whose doors faced a parking lot and, in some circumstances, a common area; or a series of small cabins with common parking. Several large motel chains exist, while conversely others are small businesses with one location that are privately owned. The first motel in the world is the Motel Inn of San Luis Obispo, California.

Several historic motels are listed on the U.S. National Register of Historic Places, the United States federal government's official list of districts, sites, buildings, structures, and objects deemed worthy of preservation.

== Motels ==
Motels that are listed on the U.S. National Register of Historic Places are denoted in the table below in the NRHP listed column.

Name	Image	NRHP listed	Description
66 Motel			An independently owned six-room motel established 1946–47 in Needles, California, that formerly served travellers on U.S. Route 66. Bypassed c. 1970 by Interstate 40, the motel has been used as single room occupancy apartments since the 1990s.
Alamo Plaza Hotel Courts			Founded by Edgar Lee Torrance in Waco, Texas, in 1929. Pictured are the original Alamo Plaza Hotel Courts in Waco.
Arizona Rancho		Yes	A former hotel in Holbrook, Arizona. It was originally built between 1881 and 1883 as a residence, then expanded as a boarding house, a hotel, and finally as a motel. The original structure is thought to be the oldest extant structure in Holbrook.
Atlanta Cabana Motel			A former 200-room motor hotel located in Midtown Atlanta, Georgia. It opened in 1958 and was demolished in 2002.
Aztec Motel		Yes	A former motel located on former U.S. Route 66 in Albuquerque, New Mexico. It was demolished in 2011.
Belvidere Café, Motel, and Gas Station		Yes	A historic building in Litchfield, Illinois, along Route 66.
Best Western			Operates about 4,000 hotels with over 1,000 employees. In the U.S., the properties can either be traditional roadside motels, motor inns, or full-service hotels. Outside the U.S., the properties are mainly hotels.
The Big Texan Steak Ranch			A steakhouse restaurant and motel located in Amarillo, Texas, which opened on the previous U.S. Route 66 in 1960 and moved to its present location on Interstate 40 in 1970. The motel is named Big Texan Motel and has 54 units.
Blue Bonnet Court		Yes	A historic motor court-style motel in north-central Austin, Texas, that was built in 1928–1929.
Blue Gables Motel		Yes	Located in Buffalo, Wyoming, and formerly known as Blue Gables Court, it was placed on the U.S. National Register of Historic Places in 2011 as part of a Multiple Property Submission devoted to historic motor courts and motels in Wyoming.
Blue Swallow Motel		Yes	Located in Tucumcari, New Mexico, it is listed on the U.S. National Register of Historic Places in New Mexico as a part of historic U.S. Route 66.
Boots Court Motel			A historic U.S. Route 66 motel in Carthage, Missouri, that opened in 1939 as the Boots Court.
Border Inn			On the Utah/Nevada border in Baker, Nevada, on U.S. 6/U.S. 50.
Budget Host			An American lodging chain that was founded in 1975 in Fort Worth, Texas.
Cactus Motor Lodge		Yes	Now named Cactus RV Park, it is a historic motel located in Tucumcari, New Mexico, on U.S. Route 66. The motel units are no longer used.
Caribbean Motel		Yes	A historic motel located in Wildwood Crest, New Jersey, in an area now known as the Wildwoods Shore Resort Historic District.
Chateau Bleu Motel		Yes	A historic motel located in North Wildwood, New Jersey, in the Wildwoods Shore Resort Historic District.
Coral Court Motel		Yes	A former 1941 U.S. Route 66 motel constructed in Marlborough, Missouri, and designated on the National Register of Historic Places listings in St. Louis County, Missouri in 1989 as a valuable example of the Art Deco and Streamline Moderne architectural styles.
The Creek South Beach			A 90-room motel located in Miami Beach, Florida, it is an example of Miami Modern architecture. The property has been prominently featured as an architecturally significant structure in the definitive book on MiMo architecture MiMo: Miami Modern Revealed.
Cross Country Inn			A former American motel chain founded in 1988 that had more than 30 locations in the Midwestern United States at its peak.
Crystal River Tourist Camp		Yes	Formerly the Crystal River Cave Court and today named Cave Courts Motel, it is a motor inn built in 1932 in Cave City, Arkansas. It is the oldest operating motor court in the state. It is built of fieldstones from the Ozarks. The motel was abandoned for several years before being purchased and restored. It is now reopened as the Cave Courts Motel. It is also listed as an Historic district in the United States.
De Anza Motor Lodge		Yes	Historic motel located on former U.S. Route 66 in the Upper Nob Hill neighborhood of Albuquerque, New Mexico. It was purchased by the city of Albuquerque in 2003. It is also listed on the New Mexico State Register of Cultural Properties.
Down-East Village Restaurant & Motel			The second motel built in Maine, in 1950, and eventually became the oldest. Demolished in 2016.
Econo Lodge			An economy motel chain based in the United States and Canada, franchised by Choice Hotels International.
El Rancho Hotel & Motel		Yes	A historic motel in Gallup, New Mexico.
El Rey Inn			Located in Santa Fe, New Mexico, it spans 5 acres (2.0 ha) and is located near what used to be U.S. Route 66. The property has traditional adobe-style buildings surrounded by gardens.
Esso Motor Hotel			This was a Swedish subsidiary of the American oil company Esso, for running hotels in Europe. The word "motel" was avoided in order to emphasize the extra features the "motor hotel" provides compared to a normal motel. The company operated motorbys, motor hotels, and motels.
The Flanders Hotel		Yes	Located in Ocean City, New Jersey, it was built in 1923 by the Ocean Front Hotel Corporation.
Glass Pool Inn			Originally opened as the Mirage Motel on the Las Vegas Strip in 1952. An above-ground swimming pool was added in 1955, and included large porthole windows that allowed outsiders to look inside. The motel became well known for its pool, which was used in numerous films, television shows, music videos, and photo shoots. The motel was closed in 2003 and demolished a year later.
The Gobbler			Pictured is The Gobbler supper club in Johnson Creek, Wisconsin; the motel was located across the street.
Heilman Villas		Yes	Located in Coronado, California, and consists of 10 standalone bungalows and one 2-story duplex. Its name has changed several times, and it is now the location of the Coronado Police Department.
Hermitage Motor Inn		Yes	Formerly the Taylor Cunningham Hotel, it is a historic lodge in Petersburg, West Virginia. It was built about 1840 as a two-story brick building in a vernacular Greek Revival style. It has been in continuous operation as an inn since 1881.
Hiway House			A former motor hotel chain founded in 1956 at Phoenix, Arizona, by the late Del Webb. After Webb sold the chain, it was renamed the Sentry Hiway House and remained in operation until sometime after 1970, by which time most of the hotels were sold off and had changed their names, with some of them becoming franchises of competing lodging chains. A remnant of the old Hiway House chain is still in operation at Albuquerque, New Mexico (pictured).
Holiday Inn			Pictured is a Holiday Inn resort in Saint-Laurent-du-Var, Alpes-Maritimes, France
Howard Johnson's			A chain of hotels, motels and restaurants located primarily throughout the United States and Canada. Founded by Howard Johnson, it was the largest restaurant chain in the US throughout the 1960s and 1970s, with more than 1,000 combined company owned and franchised outlets.
Imperial 400			A former American motel chain that was founded in 1959 in Los Angeles, California, its properties were typically two-story buildings with "gull wing" shaped roofs over the lobby.
Jupiter Hotel			Located in Portland, Oregon, and once a two-story 1960s motor lodge motel, after major renovations it reopened as the Jupiter Hotel in October 2004. During its renovation, the old motel's parking lot was transformed into a courtyard, the entire building was painted white, and all rooms were completely renovated.
Knights Inn			A hotel/motel chain owned by Wyndham Worldwide and based in Parsippany, New Jersey. As of November 2007, there were 225 properties open in the United States and Canada.
La Concha Motel			Opened in 1961 and closed in December 2003, it was located on Las Vegas Blvd South in Winchester, Nevada, and was considered one of the best-preserved examples of 1950s Googie architecture. The motel was demolished and was restored at the Neon Museum in Las Vegas, in which some of the original components of the motel were used.
Lazy A Motel		Yes	A historic former motel located along Old U.S. Route 66 in Springfield, Illinois. The motel was built in 1948–49 and had 13 rooms arranged in a U shape, with garages located between the rooms. Since the motel's closure, the building has been used for apartments.
Little A'Le'Inn			A small bar, restaurant and motel located in Rachel, Nevada, on the Extraterrestrial Highway.
Log Cabin Motel		Yes	Also known as Camp O' the Pines, it is located in Pinedale, Wyoming, and was built in 1929 as a cabin camp to serve growing numbers of automobile-borne tourists bound for Yellowstone National Park.
Lorraine Motel			Built around the former Lorraine Motel, the National Civil Rights Museum is a privately owned complex of museums and historic buildings in Memphis, Tennessee, which traces the history of the Civil Rights Movement in the United States from the 17th century to the present.
Loveless Cafe			Located in southwest Nashville on Tennessee State Route 100, it is known for its Southern cooking.
Madonna Inn			A motel in San Luis Obispo, California, that opened in 1958.
Masters Inn			A chain of motels in the United States that operates 15 locations in 6 states.
Motel 6			A major chain of budget motels with more than 1,000 locations in the United States and Canada. Motel 6 also operates Studio 6, a chain of extended stay hotels. Pictured is the first Motel 6 in Santa Barbara, California, which remains in business.
Motel Inn of San Luis Obispo			Created in 1925 by Arthur Heineman and originally known as the Milestone Mo-Tel, it is the first motel in the world. It is located in San Luis Obispo, California.
Munger-Moss Motel			Munger-Moss Sandwich Shop served travelers on U.S. Route 66 in Missouri circa-1936. Located on the Big Piney River at Devils Elbow, Missouri, until 1945 (at what is now the Elbow Inn), it relocated to Lebanon, Missouri, after World War II] when construction of a four-lane bypass of Route 66 to Fort Leonard Wood military base drew traffic away from the original Munger Moss BBQ site. The Munger Moss Motel was added in 1946 as an addition to the Lebanon roadside restaurant and filling station, both of which are now gone. Munger-Moss Motel remains in business.
Pakistan Tourism Development Corporation			An organization of the Government of Pakistan that is governed by the Board of Directors headed by the Minister for Tourism. PTDC runs motels at a number of locations throughout Pakistan to provide quality low-cost accommodation for visitors.
Park Motel		Yes	Located in Denison, Iowa, this is an example of a well-preserved pre-war highway motel during the early age of motoring.
Piedras Blancas Motel			A vintage roadside motel-and-diner complex located along the Central Coast of California approximately 7 miles (11 km) north of San Simeon. It is located at a remote, wild and rural section of the two-lane historic State Route 1, and is now owned by the state park system of California.
Rainbow Court		Yes	A historic hotel/motel complex at Myrtle Beach, South Carolina, that includes two motel-type buildings, five beach cottages/boarding houses, and a small house. There are six contributing buildings. It is one of the few remaining examples of the small-scale, low-rise motels that pre-dates Hurricane Hazel (1954).
Red Caboose Motel			A 48-room train motel located near Ronks, Pennsylvania.
Red Carpet Inn			A chain of hotels and motels, with locations in the United States and Bahamas.
Red Crown Tourist Court			Located in Platte County, Missouri, at the junction of US 71 and Route 59 (now I-435), this small motel was built in 1931 and consisted of two small cabins connected by two garages. The front of the property had the Red Crown Tavern, which was a tavern, restaurant and ballroom. It is the site of the July 20, 1933 gun battle between lawmen and outlaws Bonnie and Clyde and three members of their gang.
Red Roof Inn			An economy hotel chain in the United States, their properties are distinguished by the large dark-red shingle roof that gives them their name. There are over 340 Red Roof Inns, primarily in the Midwest, Southern, and Eastern United States.
Rodeway Inn			An economy motel chain based in the United States and Canada, franchised by Choice Hotels International.
Roy's Motel and Café			A motel, café, gas station and auto repair shop, defunct for many years but now being largely restored, on the National Trails Highway of U.S. Route 66 in the Mojave Desert town of Amboy in San Bernardino County, California. The historic site is an example of roadside mid-century modern Googie architecture. The coffee shop and gas station have both been refurbished and were reopened on April 28, 2008.
Scottish Inns			A chain that began in the late 1960s in Tennessee, it was a company that did not operate its own motels, but leased out the name to others. This changed in 1973, as the company assumed ownership of almost all properties. A 1974 Scottish Inns of America locations directory listed 70 Scottish Inns.
Sea Chest Motel		Yes	A family-owned Doo-Wop style motel built in the 1950s, located in Wildwood Crest, New Jersey, within the Wildwoods Shore Resort Historic District.
Star Lite Motel			A historic motel in Dilworth, Minnesota, and one of the oldest buildings there. It is the oldest motel in Clay County. Earlier it was known as Charley's Motel.
Sun-n-Sand Motor Hotel			A motel that opened in 1960 in downtown Jackson, Mississippi. Due to its proximity to the Mississippi State Capitol, it was frequently used by state legislators, and during the civil rights movement, it was used by many activists. It was declared a Mississippi Landmark and added to the National Trust for Historic Preservation's list of America's Most Endangered Places in 2020. It was partially demolished in 2021.
Super 8 Motels			Super 8 Worldwide, formerly Super 8 Motels, is the world's largest budget hotel chain, with motels in the United States, Canada and newer properties in China. The company is a subsidiary of Wyndham Worldwide, formerly a part of Cendant.
Thunderbird Motel			A Native American-themed motel that was built in 1962 along Interstate 494 and 24th Ave. in Bloomington, Minnesota, a suburb of Minneapolis. It is an example of post-war Americana. It is part of the Ramada franchise. The original Thunderbird Hotel no longer exists.
Travelodge			Travelodge (formerly styled TraveLodge) refers to several hotel chains around the world. Current operations include the United States, Canada, the United Kingdom, Spain, the Republic of Ireland, New Zealand and Australia. However, many of these are operated by independent companies who have no connection with the brand in other countries.
Tucson Inn			Tucson Inn is a modernist post WWII American motel designed by female architect Anne Rysdale. The property opened in February 1953 in Tucson, Arizona along US Highway Route 80 and 89. The motel was expanded in 1956 and included an iconic Neon Sign that has been widely published. It was listed on the U.S. National Register of Historic Places in October 2017 as a part of the Miracle Mile Historic District. In 2018, the motel was purchased by Pima Community College, and was demolished in April 2025.
Twin Bridges Motor Hotel			Later known as the Twin Bridges Marriott, it was the first lodging facility operated by what would become Marriott International. Since the Marriott Hotel chain did not exist, the hotel was operated as a Quality Courts motel (the precursor to Choice Hotels) for the first few years. This former motel was located in Arlington, Virginia, opened on about January 18, 1957, and was demolished in 1990.
Vagabond Inn			An upper-end economy and mid-priced chain of hotels and motels located on the West Coast of the United States with 38 locations in California, Nevada and Oregon.
Vibe Hotel			Built in 1952 and located on Hollywood Boulevard in Los Angeles, California, it was originally known as the Movie Town Motel. It was built in the classic era and style of Googie architecture. The donut-shaped motel features retro design elements of that period, along with a motif of bright colors, tile and furniture all reminiscent of the fifties and sixties.
Wagon Wheel Motel and Restaurant			Was a famous office, motel and restaurant complex located in Oxnard, California, at the intersection of U.S. Route 101 and Pacific Coast Highway. It was demolished in 2011 due to the pending development of 1,500 residential units.
Wagon Wheel Motel, Café and Station		Yes	A 19-room independently-owned historic U.S. Route 66 restored motel in Cuba, Missouri, which has been serving travelers for more than 75 years.
Warm Mineral Springs Motel		Yes	A historic 1958 motel near Warm Mineral Springs, Florida, that is known for its mushroom champagne glass-style roof and glass walls, allowing guests to see the stars. It was selected by the American Institute of Architects for the 1958 Special Awards.
West Winds Motel		Yes	Located on old U.S. Route 66 in Erick, Oklahoma, it opened in the mid-1940s to serve travelers on Route 66; at the time, tourism drove Erick's economy, and the motel was one of several in the city. The lodging buildings have a Mission Revival design with stucco walls and red metal roofs designed to resemble tile. The motel units have individual garage spaces in front of their entrances, a style which was common in the 1930s and 1940s but fell out of favor in later years.
Wigwam Motel		Yes (remaining three motels)	Pictured is the front of the Wigwam Motel in Holbrook, Arizona.
Williams Deluxe Cabins		Yes	A historic motel complex located in West Whiteland Township, Pennsylvania. It was built in 1937 and includes four contributing buildings, a service station and motel office, house, and two multiple rental units. The buildings have Tudor Revival design influences, such as half-timbering and rough faced stucco finish.

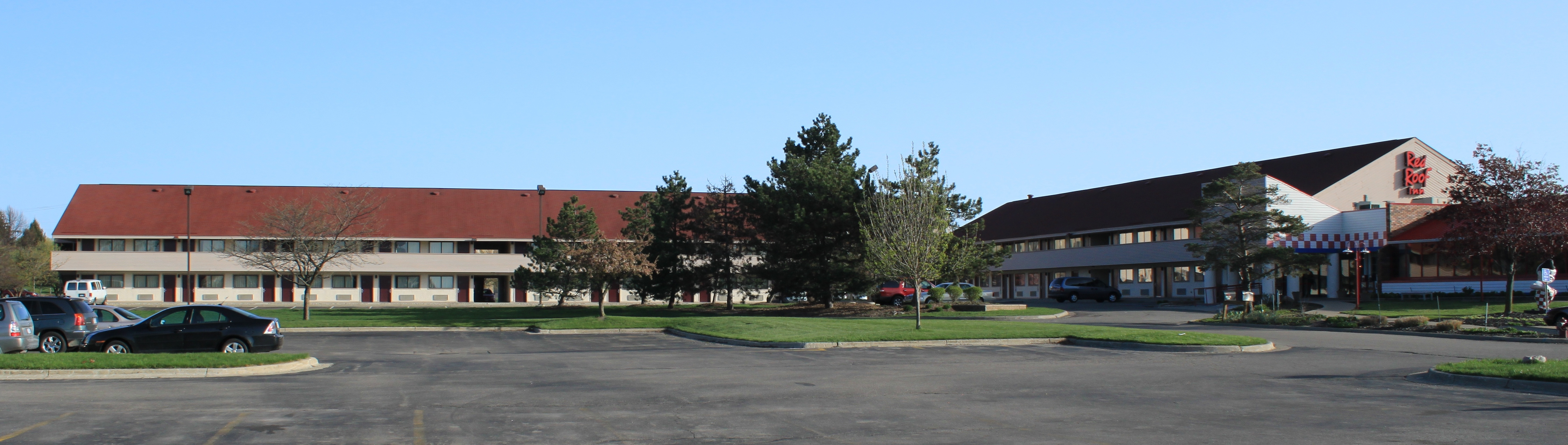
A Red Roof Inn in Ann Arbor, Michigan

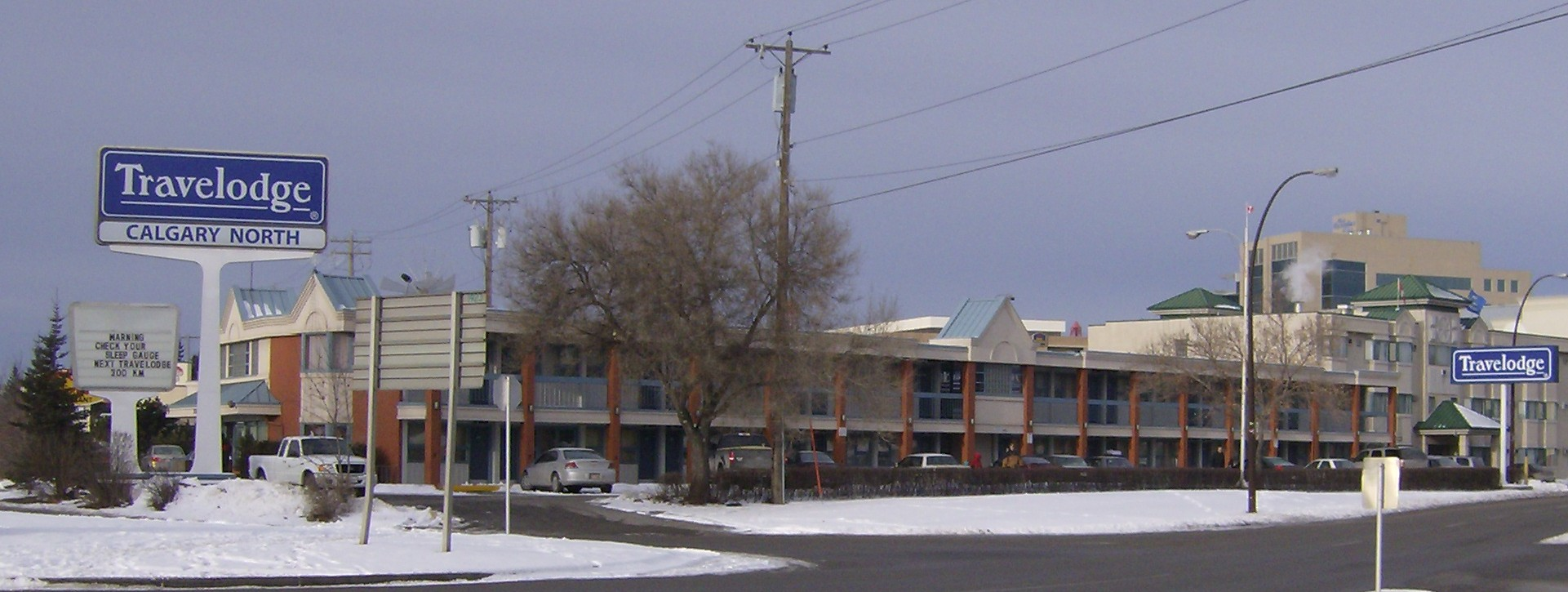
A Travelodge in Calgary, Alberta

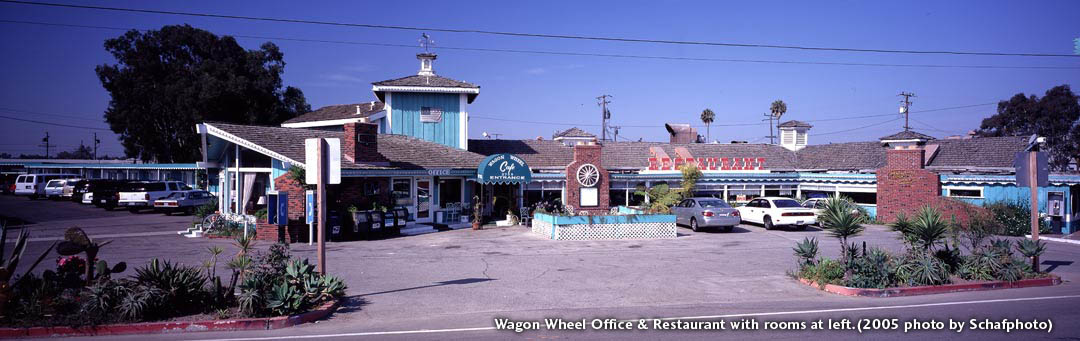
The former Wagon Wheel Motel and Restaurant in Oxnard, California. The motel is at the left. It was demolished in 2011.

== See also ==
- Inn
- List of hotels in the United States
- List of largest hotels in the world
- Lists of hotels – an index of hotel list articles on Wikipedia
- Lodging
- Magic Fingers
- Motel era in Toronto
