= Log Cabin Motel (Pinedale, Wyoming) =

- U.S. National Register of Historic Places
- U.S. Historic district
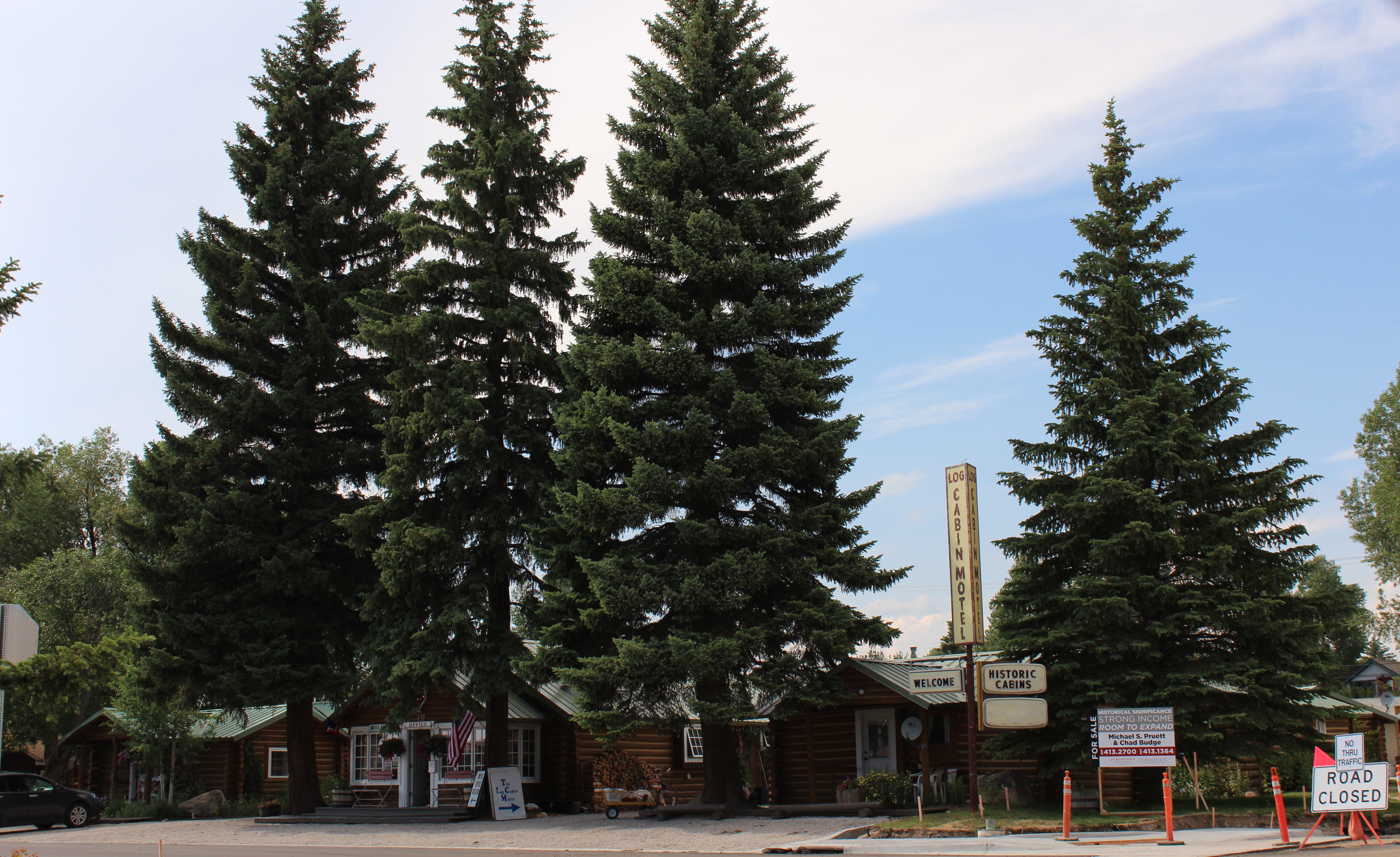

- Location within Wyoming Location within the United States
- Location: 49 E Magnolia St. Pinedale, Wyoming, United States 82941
- Coordinates: 42°52′4″N 109°51′34″W
- Built: 1929
- NRHP reference No.: 93000230
- Added to NRHP: March 25, 1993

The Log Cabin Motel, also known as Camp O' The Pines in Pinedale, Wyoming, United States, was built in 1929 as a cabin camp to serve growing numbers of automobile-borne tourists bound for Yellowstone National Park. The camp was owned by Walter Scott, who operated the Pinedale Cash Store. Contrary to the name, Scott allowed customers to buy on credit, and some worked off their credit by building cabins at Camp O' The Pines. Unlike many auto camps, the camp was open year-round, with cabins often rented by the month by local people.

The seven cabins were arranged in a semicircle around a residence and a bath house. Indoor plumbing was added to the cabins in the 1930s and 1940s. The residence and bath house were converted into cabins, and a matching cabin was added in 2007.

== See also ==
- List of motels
