= Down-East Village Restaurant & Motel =

Coordinates: 43.8032°N 70.1818°W

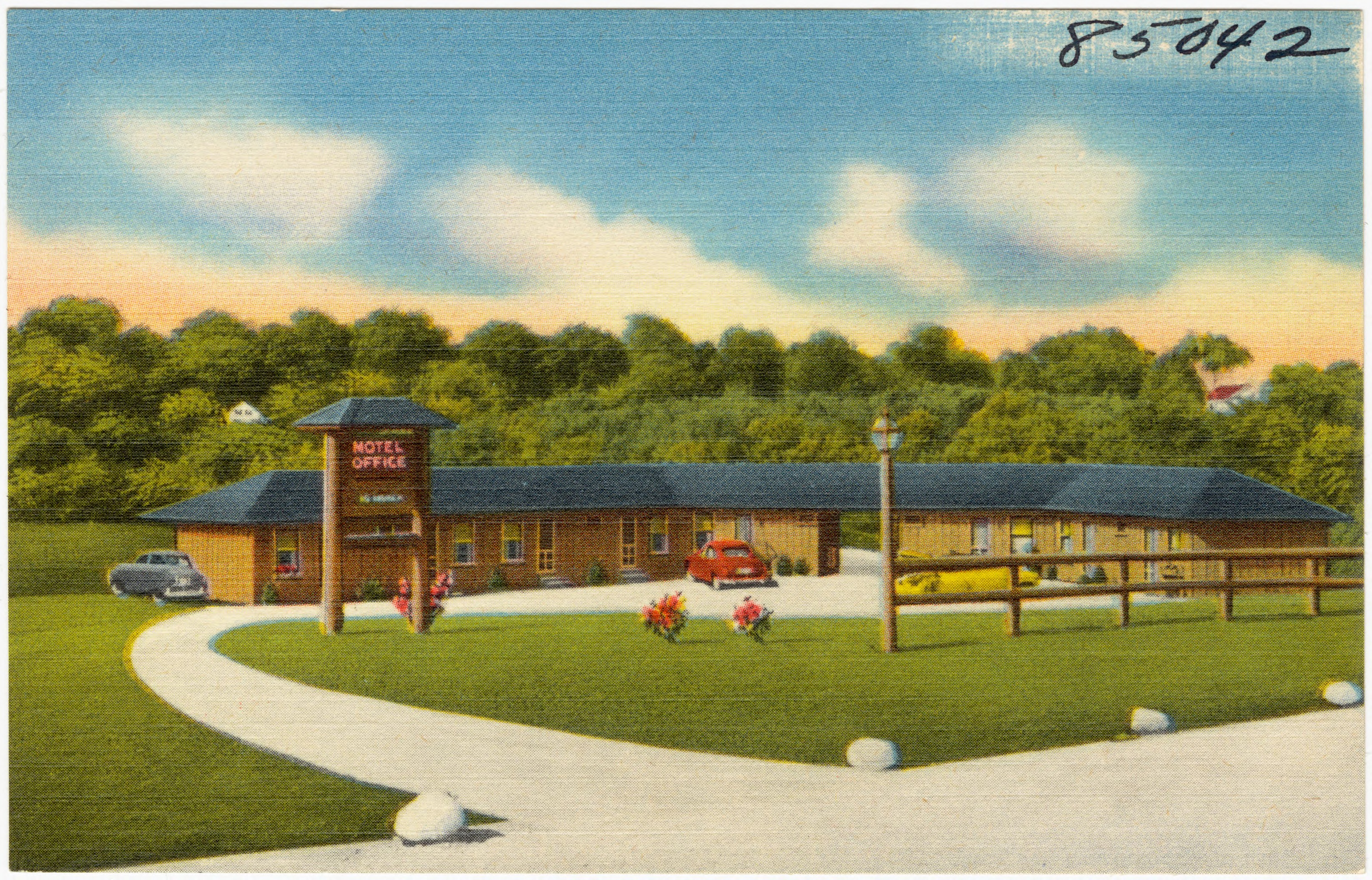
- An illustrated postcard of the premises, around 1940
- Founded: 1950
- Founder: Herb Ferrell; Barb Ferrell
- Defunct: 2011
- Fate: Demolished (2017)
- Successor: Canelli's Italian Restaurant
- Headquarters: Yarmouth, Maine, U.S.
- Owners: Ed Ferrell; Sue Ferrell

Down-East Village Restaurant & Motel was a business that existed in Yarmouth, Maine, from 1950 to 2011. It was the second motel built in Maine, and eventually became the oldest in operation.

== History ==
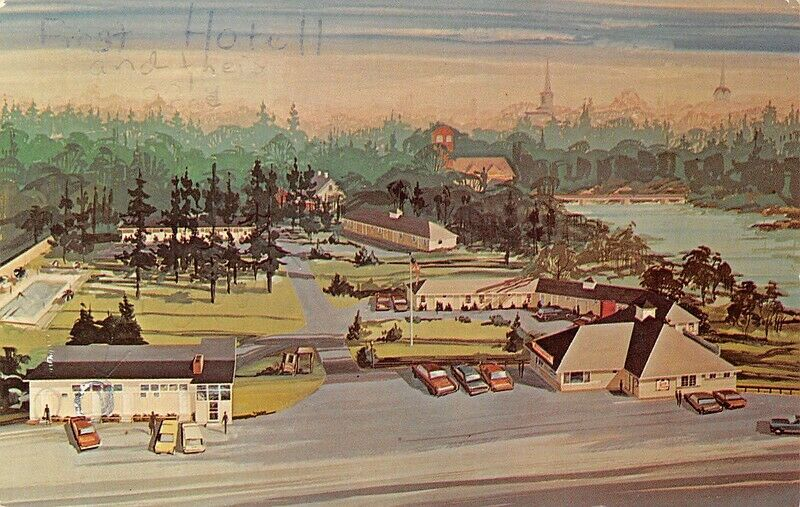
An illustrated postcard of the premises, around 1960, from above US 1

E. V. Yeager owned a sporting goods business on nearby Route 88, and in 1949 moved it to U.S. Route 1 (US 1), to open the following year as the Down-East Village Motel, with a Gulf gas station. They leased the restaurant to Simpson's Hamburger.

In 1952, Yeager's children took over the restaurant, naming it the Down-Easter. It later passed to Ed Ferrell, Yeager's grandson.

Interstate 295 was built through Yarmouth in 1963, diverting traffic from downtown Yarmouth and, thus, damaging the restaurant's lunch business.

The family built the business back, adding more motel rooms and a swimming pool.

Sue Ferrell began working at the restaurant in 1972. The following year, after Ed Ferrell's father, Herb, had a stroke, Ferrell, 23, became the general manager of both the motel and restaurant.

The Ferrells were the recipients of the town's annual Latchstring Award in 2011.

Massachusetts natives Ken and Ellie Arra leased the space from the Ferrells for their Italian restaurant, Canelli's, which opened in 2011 but closed shortly thereafter, with its owners leaving town without informing their staff.

After subsequently lying vacant for several years, the town permitted the buildings to be demolished in 2016. Patriot Insurance Company moved into the new structure the following year.

== See also ==
- List of motels
- Historical buildings and structures of Yarmouth, Maine
