= Masters Inn =

American motel chain

Outside of a Masters Inn

Masters Inn is a chain of motels in the United States. The chain operates 15 locations in 6 states.

== History ==
The first location existed in Kansas City in 1985 through the name change of a previously existing motel. In 2007, the chain was acquired by Supertel. The group sold its Cave City, Kentucky location in 2010.

== See also ==
- List of motels
