= Rodeway Inn =

Economy hotel chain run by Choice Hotels

- Type: Brand of Choice Hotels
- Industry: Hotels
- Founded: 1962
- Founders: Michael Robinson; Joe Simmons
- Number of locations: 456 (December 31, 2024)
- Area served: United States, Canada
- Owner: Choice Hotels
- Website: www.choicehotels.com/rodeway-inn

Rodeway Inn is a chain of hotels in the United States and Canada. Founded by Michael Robinson in 1962, the franchise is now led by Choice Hotels International. As of December 31, 2024, there are 456 Rodeway Inn locations in North America, with approximately 25,458 rooms across the continent.

== History ==
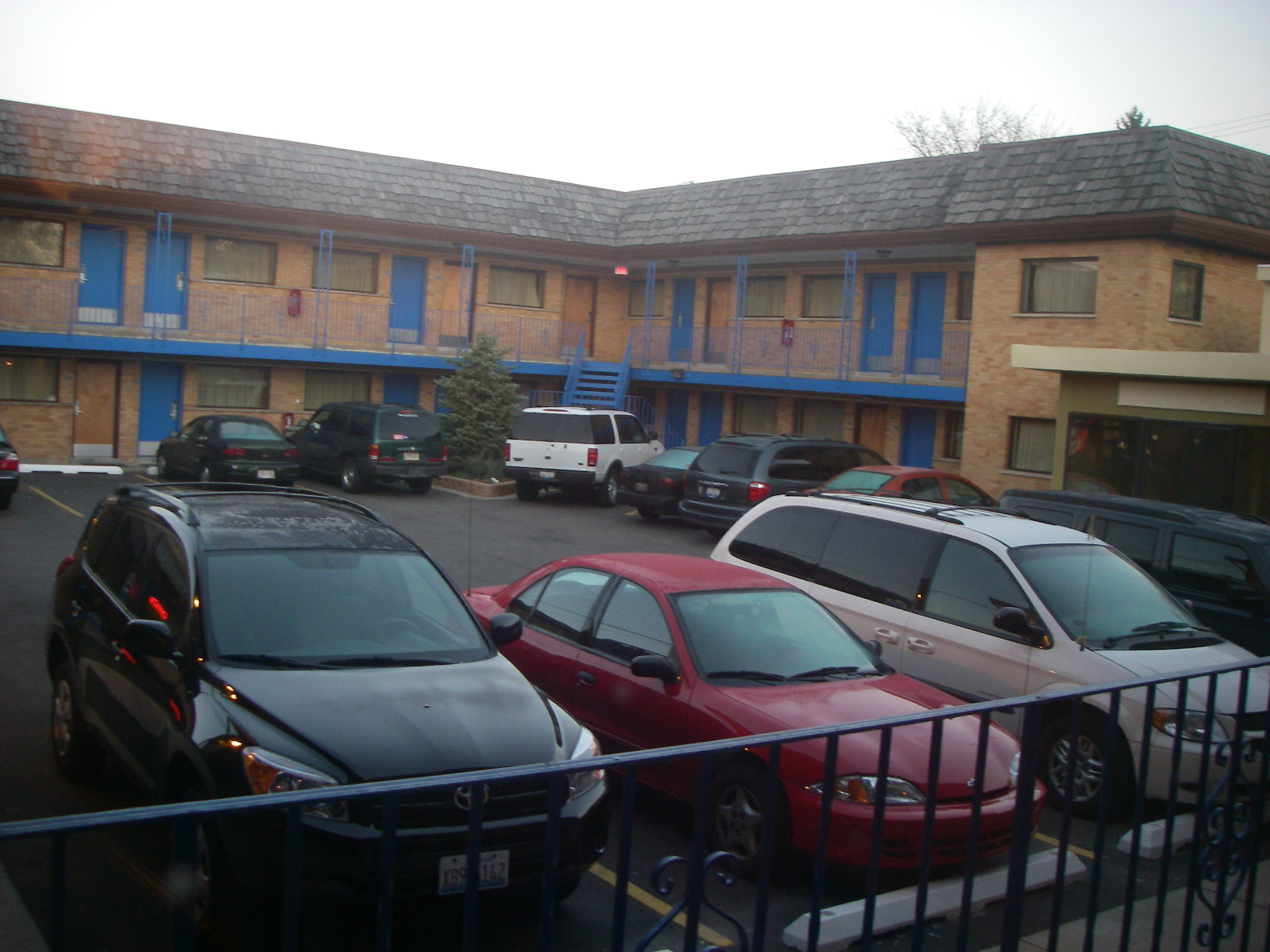
Rodeway Inn in Chicago

Rodeway Inn was established in Phoenix, Arizona in 1962, when Michael Robinson and his son-in-law Joe Simmons opened the chain under the name Rodeway Inns of America. The company was acquired by the Vantage Company of Dallas, Texas in 1971.

By 1973, there were 136 Rodeway Inns, mostly centered around the Mid-South and Southwestern United States. In the early 1970s, Prudential Life Insurance partnered with Rodeway Inns to finance company-owned locations. However, Rodeway Inns stopped operating hotels directly in 1976 and instead focused exclusively on franchising.

The Ladbroke Group, a British company, purchased the brand in 1985, but sold it two years later to Ramada Inns. Ramada Inns was acquired by Prime Motor Inns, which sold the Rodeway brand to New Image Realty in 1990. Just a month later, Choice Hotels International acquired New Image Realty, and thus the Rodeway Brand, along with Econo Lodge and Friendship Inn. In 1997, the Friendship Inn chain was absorbed into the Rodeway Inn and Econo Lodge brands.

From 1990 to 2005, the franchise fee was structured as a revenue percentage. In 2005, Rodeway Inn, led by Division President Kevin Bradt, reorganized its franchise fee structure, switching to an annual fee per room in order to attract franchisees to the hotel chain.

== See also ==
- List of hotels
- Choice Hotels
