= Carolyn A. Guertin =

Civil Air Patrol member (1928–2020)

- Born: June 29, 1928
- Died: August 8, 2020 (aged 92)
- Burial place: Beth-El Cemetery, Richmond, Virginia
- Spouse: Donald Guertin
- Military career
- Allegiance: United States of America
- Service/branch: Civil Air Patrol
- Service years: 78
- Rank: Colonel, CAP
- Commands: Squadron Commander, CAP
- Conflicts: World War II
- Awards: Congressional Gold Medal

Carolyn A. Guertin (1928–2020) was the first female member of the Civil Air Patrol and the eleventh member overall.

== Civil Air Patrol career ==
Guertin joined the Civil Air Patrol on 1 December 1941, its founding date. She was the first in line to sign up, but was asked to wait until 10 men joined. She served the organization in multiple ground roles during World War II, including tracking in-flight aircraft.

In 1952, Guertin founded a Civil Air Patrol squadron in Richmond, Virginia and served as its commander for over ten years. The squadron was later renamed from "Richmond Cadet Squadron 2" to "The Carolyn A. Guertin Cadet Squadron" in her honor.

During her time in the Civil Air Patrol, Guertin had the opportunities to meet Chuck Yeager, Jimmy Doolittle, and Igor Sikorsky.

To mark Guertin's 92nd birthday, a ceremony was hosted that included appearances by Civil Air Patrol National Commander Mark Smith and Virginia governor Ralph Northam. Smith announced that Guertin had been promoted to the rank of colonel within the Civil Air Patrol, and Northam declared that June 29 was "Carolyn A. Guertin Day" in Virginia.

== Awards ==
Guertin was awarded the Congressional Gold Medal in December 2014 for her contributions to the Civil Air Patrol's actions in World War II.
