= Imperial 400 =

American motel chain (1959–1987)

- Industry: Hotels
- Founded: Los Angeles, California 1959
- Defunct: 1987
- Area served: United States
- Key people: Bernard Whitney (founder)
- Services: Lodging

Imperial 400 was an American motel chain. It was founded in 1959 by Bernard Whitney in Los Angeles, California. Its properties were typically two-story buildings with "gull wing" shaped roofs over the lobby. It was a limited-service hotel chain, competing mainly with Travelodge.

In 1965, Imperial 400 filed for Chapter 11 bankruptcy. Its headquarters were moved to Englewood Cliffs, New Jersey, and again to Arlington, Virginia. By the 1980s, the chain was sold to Interpart S.A., a Luxembourg-based company, and was later dissolved. Imperial 400 structures still exist but are usually rundown motels, with the exception of a few. In Richland, WA a former Imperial is boarded and set to be demolished for new apartments.

== See also ==
- List of motels
