= Cyntoia Brown =

American author and speaker (born 1988)

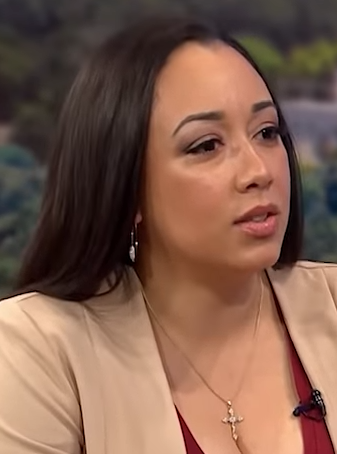
- Brown in 2019
- Born: Cyntoia Denise Brown; January 29, 1988 (age 38); Fort Campbell, Kentucky, U.S.
- Other name: Cyntoia Brown Long
- Education: Lipscomb University (AA, BPS)
- Occupations: Author; motivational speaker
- Employer(s): Ambassador Speakers Bureau, Atria Books
- Organization(s): The Foundation For Justice, Mercy, and Freedom (The JFAM Foundation)
- Known for: Sentenced to life in prison at age 16 for murder; later granted clemency by Gov. Bill Haslam
- Notable work: Free Cyntoia: My Search for Redemption in the American Prison System
- Spouse: J. Long (m. 2019)
- Website: cyntoiabrown.com

Cyntoia Brown Long (née Brown; born January 29, 1988) is an American author and speaker who was convicted of robbing and murdering the person who bought her from sex trafficking. Brown, who was a victim of child sex trafficking at the time of the incident in 2004, claimed that Johnny Allen had paid her $150 to have sex with her, and that she feared for her life during their encounter, leading her to shoot him. Prosecutors argued that Brown killed Allen while he was sleeping. Brown was found guilty of robbing and murdering Allen and was sentenced to life imprisonment at 16.

She would have been eligible for parole at the age of 67. After renewed interest in her case in 2013, Tennessee Governor Bill Haslam commuted her original sentence to 15 years and Brown was released on August 7, 2019. Her story is detailed in the 2011 documentary Me Facing Life: Cyntoia's Story and in her memoir, Free Cyntoia: My Search for Redemption in the American Prison System. Her fight for freedom from prison is documented in the Netflix special Murder to Mercy: The Cyntoia Brown Story (2020).

== Early life ==
Cyntoia Denise Brown was born at Fort Campbell, Kentucky, on January 29, 1988. Her father is unknown. Her biological mother, Georgina Mitchell, drank alcohol during her pregnancy. Brown's defense attorneys would later claim that this caused her to develop fetal alcohol spectrum disorder. Following Brown's birth, Mitchell began to use crack cocaine. Unable to care for her infant daughter, Mitchell placed the child up for adoption.

Although raised in a loving home, Brown dropped out of elementary school and eventually began to have encounters with the juvenile court system. She spent time with the state's Department of Children's Services between April 2001 and September 2003 after committing "crimes against a person, and crimes against property," according to spokeswoman Carla Aaron. While in custody of the DCS, Brown spent two years in DCS facilities, including a year at Woodland Hills Youth Development Center in Nashville. She fled these facilities several times, eventually ending up as a runaway on the streets of Nashville in August 2004. While a runaway, Brown met Garion L. McGlothen (also known by the street name Kut-Throat, often abbreviated to Kut or Cut), who began trafficking Brown. During this time, she lived at an InTown Suites hotel. Brown supported McGlothen and herself via involuntary prostitution as a victim of domestic minor sex trafficking. According to Brown, McGlothen threatened, beat, and raped her on multiple occasions.

== Murder of Johnny Allen ==
Murder of Johnny Allen
- Date: August 7, 2004
- Type: Homicide, shooting
- Motive: Disputed
- Deaths: Johnny Michael Allen
- Convicted: Cyntoia Denise Brown
- Verdict: Guilty on all counts
- Convictions: First degree murder; Aggravated robbery; Handgun possession; Criminal impersonation
- Sentence: Life in prison with the possibility of parole after 51 years (2006); Reduced to 15 years in prison (2019)

On the night of August 6, 2004, 16-year-old Brown met 43-year-old Johnny Michael Allen in the parking lot of a Sonic Drive-In on Murfreesboro Road in Nashville, Tennessee. Allen was a real estate agent. He also was a youth pastor and a Sunday school teacher and had started a homeless ministry at a local Baptist church.

According to a detective on the case, Allen asked her if she was hungry and if she was "up for any action." The detective asserted that Brown answered yes to both questions and accepted Allen's offer to take her to his house. Brown and Allen ordered dinner and Allen drove the pair to his home. At a later hearing, Brown testified that she agreed to have sex with Allen for $150, but claimed that they never actually engaged in sexual intercourse. Allen's friends and family denied that he had tried to solicit Brown for sex, instead claiming that he was trying to help her. However, the lead prosecutor in the case, Jeff Burks stipulated that Allen picked Brown up to pay her for sex, stating, "That was a fact from start to finish."

In court documents, another minor who was a waitress at a local restaurant claimed that she and the other young teens at the restaurant felt uncomfortable whenever they had to serve Allen. The waitress said that he would hit on the teens regularly.

At some point during the encounter, Brown shot Allen in the back of the head using her .40-caliber handgun. She then stole $172 from Allen's wallet and two of his firearms and fled the scene in Allen's truck. Brown left Allen's truck at a Walmart parking lot and flagged down an SUV for a ride home. Police later found Brown and McGlothen at the nearby InTown Suites.

In a letter asking Governor Haslam to deny clemency, the lead detective in the case of Allen's murder wrote that on August 7, Brown had a neighbor drive her to the Walmart where she had left Allen's truck. The detective says that Brown asked the neighbor to drive her back to Allen's house so that she could steal more items but he refused. The neighbor reportedly told the detective that Brown told him that she “shot somebody in the head for fifty thousand dollars and some guns” and that she "shot somebody in the head last night and blew his brains out." The detective further asserted that Brown told the neighbor that the killing was a "fat lick" (robbery) and that she had been "waiting on a lick like that all week." According to the detective, after the neighbor told his roommate about the incident Brown called him on the phone and threatened him, saying “you better stop running your fucking mouth about my business or I’ll get to you too.”

== Arrest and trial ==
Brown was arrested and charged with homicide, aggravated robbery, handgun possession, and criminal impersonation. Despite being only 16 at the time of the killing, she was tried as an adult. This decision came from Metro Juvenile Court Judge Betty Adams Green on November 14, 2004, who argued that it was too much of a risk to the community to keep the 16-year-old in the Juvenile Court System.

Brown never denied shooting Allen; rather, she argued that the act was committed in self defense. Brown stated that Allen had intimidated her by repeatedly standing over her and touching her while she lay in his bed, and that she believed Allen was reaching for a firearm as the two lay in bed. This led her to shoot Allen with her own firearm, which she had gotten from her pimp for protection. No firearm was ever found despite her claims and Allen was discovered in a sleeping position when his body was found. Prosecutors took the stance that Brown had not been in danger and that she had murdered Allen as he slept naked in bed in order to rob him.

=== Evidence presented by the prosecution ===
Police noted that no gun was found under or near Allen's bed. Based on the position in which his body was discovered, investigators believe that Allen was asleep when he was shot. Forensics noted that postmortem, Allen was lying with his hands underneath his head and his fingers interlocked.

On August 14, Brown was taken to the Western Mental Health Institute for an evaluation. According to court documents, Brown allegedly attacked and threatened a nurse at the Mental Health Institute after the nurse did not allow her to call her adoptive mother. The nurse claimed that Brown jumped over her desk, grabbed her hair and face, and hit her, giving her several bruises and abrasions. During the attack, Brown allegedly told the nurse "I shot that man in the back of the head one time, bitch, I’m gonna shoot you in the back of the head three times. I’d love to hear your blood splatter on the wall." The nurse, along with another Western Mental Health Institute employee who witnessed the incident, testified at trial.

Three jail inmates, hoping to receive leniency in their own pending criminal cases, claimed Brown spoke to them about the crime and confessed to killing Allen "just to see how it felt to kill somebody." One inmate later gave police a note Brown had allegedly given her which said: “everything is the truth, I swear it on my life except for ‘I thought he was getting a gun’ and the feeling of nervousness.” At trial, a forensic document examiner testified that, in his opinion, the note was written by Brown. The cellmate whom Brown had given the note to and spoken with also testified at trial.

Further evidence against Brown came from a phone call between her and her adoptive mother. During the call, Brown said, “I killed somebody. … I executed him.”

=== Evidence presented by Brown ===
At trial, defense attorneys argued that 43-year-old Allen had a "dark side" and was intent on sexually assaulting 16-year-old Brown when he got in the bed with her, naked. The defense stance was that Brown was defending herself against sexual assault when she killed Allen.

During the trial, Brown presented several witnesses on her behalf, including one who had previously interacted with Allen. During one alleged incident, Allen had invited that witness into his home and began kissing her. The witness testified that she told Allen she did not want to have sex. She claimed that Allen then proceeded to rape her. There was another witness, a 17-year-old girl who worked at a restaurant, whom the judge did not allow the jury to hear, labeling her testimony "irrelevant." According to this witness, Allen handed her his business card and wrote a personal message on the back saying, “You’re gorgeous. I’d love to take you out sometime, so let me know.” The witness further testified that other teens who worked at the restaurant felt uncomfortable serving Allen because of his flirtatious behavior with them.

=== Verdict ===
Brown was found guilty of first-degree murder, felony murder and aggravated robbery and sentenced to life in prison. She was 16 when she went to prison.

== Incarceration ==
Brown served her sentence at the Debra K. Johnson Rehabilitation Center, a maximum security detention facility in Nashville, Tennessee. Under her original sentence, she would have been eligible for parole at age 67. In prison, Brown earned her GED with a score of 656 in March 2005, an associate degree in Liberal Arts with a 4.0 GPA in December 2015 from Lipscomb University, and a Bachelors of Professional Studies in Organizational Leadership with a 4.0 GPA in May 2019 from Lipscomb University. She was referenced as a model prisoner in testimony presented at her clemency hearing before the Tennessee Board of Parole.

Brown's former pimp, Garion L. McGlothen, also known as Gary McGlothen and Kut-Throat, died on March 30, 2005, at the age of 24, having been shot and killed by Quartez Hines. His story was featured in the 2011 documentary, Me Facing Life: Cyntoia's Story.

The producer of Me Facing Life: Cyntoia's Story, Dan Birman, continued to follow Brown's case and other instances of juveniles sentenced to long terms in a seven-part online video series in 2016–2017, "Sentencing Children," done in collaboration with the PBS series Independent Lens and reporter Anita Wadhwani at The Tennessean newspaper. Unused footage from these projects was repurposed into a Netflix Original documentary titled, "Murder to Mercy: The Cyntoia Brown Story."

== Clemency and appeals ==
On November 21, 2017, Brown's case went viral following several high-profile celebrity social media posts expressing outrage over her sentence. Celebrities that posted include Rihanna, Kim Kardashian, T.I., Snoop Dogg, and LeBron James. In March 2018, it was announced that the Tennessee Board of Parole would hold a hearing on Brown's clemency petition, a move that only 2% of Tennessee clemency applicants see. The public hearing was held on May 28, 2018, at the Tennessee Prison for Women. At the hearing, several witnesses that knew Brown from prison testified on her behalf, including Lipscomb University faculty, her former prosecutor Preston Shipp, prison employees, local victim rights advocates, and a local nonprofit leader who ran a mentoring group for at risk teens with Brown. Allen's friend testified against clemency. Charles Robinson, a Nashville police detective who served as the lead detective in Allen's murder investigation, also testified against clemency for Brown. He told the board that he did not believe there was any evidence to support the claim that Brown had been trafficked since she was 12 and that Allen's killing was unjustified. The parole board was divided, with two voting to grant Brown clemency with her having already served 15 years, two voting that Brown's sentence should be reduced from 51 to 25 years, and two voting to deny clemency.

On December 6, 2018, the Tennessee Supreme Court answered a question of law in conjunction with Brown's federal habeas corpus appeal, stating that she would be eligible for parole after serving 51 years. In response to the Tennessee Supreme Court's ruling, a wave of support resurged that encouraged Tennessee Governor Bill Haslam to grant Brown clemency. Letters and phone calls flooded the Governor's office and social media. Detective Charles Robinson wrote a seven-page letter urging Governor Haslam not to give Brown clemency. He wrote that "Cyntoia Brown did not commit this murder because she was a child sex slave as her advocates would like you to believe. Cyntoia Brown's motive for murdering Johnny Allen in his sleep was robbery." He also wrote "At the beginning of this investigation, I considered the possibility that Cyntoia Brown was justified in killing Johnny Allen. At the conclusion of this investigation, my findings were that she was not justified in killing Mr. Allen and her only motivation for the murder was robbery."

On January 7, 2019, Haslam commuted Brown's sentence of life in prison to 15 years plus 10 years of supervised parole. Brown was released from prison on August 7, 2019. Haslam said his decision came "after careful consideration of what is a tragic and complex case" and further stated that "imposing a life sentence on a juvenile that would require her to serve at least 51 years before even being eligible for parole consideration is too harsh." Friends and family of Allen did not approve of Governor Haslam's decision, writing on the Friends of Johnny Allen Facebook page, "Our hearts are broken today as the Governor has decided to grant Johnny's murderer clemency. The activist mob with their repetition of Cyntoia's lies and slander managed to prevail against justice."

== Life after prison ==
While still in prison, Brown married musician and entrepreneur Jaime Long, who performed under the name J. Long and was formerly associated with the R&B group Pretty Ricky. She is now referred to as Cyntoia Brown Long.

Since her release from prison, Brown has conducted interviews sharing her insight and critique of the criminal justice system. She has been the featured keynote speaker for different groups, sharing her testimony of surviving domestic minor sex trafficking and her experience with the criminal justice system. She has been referenced as an advocate and activist. The ACLU brought in Brown to head their national campaign urging Governors to use their executive power of clemency to combat systemic injustice and racism.

A memoir of Brown's 15 years in prison titled Free Cyntoia: My Search for Redemption in the American Prison System was published by Atria Books on October 15, 2019.

A documentary entitled Murder to Mercy: The Cyntoia Brown Story was released on Netflix on April 29, 2020. In August 2020 it was announced that media personality Lala Anthony was working with 50 Cent on a scripted series based on Brown.

Brown and her husband founded a nonprofit organization together upon her release. The Foundation for Justice, Freedom, and Mercy operates under the name of The JFAM Foundation and is a 501(c)(3) organization that aims to empower individuals who are at risk of exploitation or criminal justice system involvement.

== Film, television, and radio appearances ==
Year	Outlet	Feature film or episode
2011	PBS Independent Lens	Me Facing Life: Cyntoia's Story
Oct. 15, 2019	Today	"Cyntoia Brown-Long Opens Up About Her Fight For Freedom"
Oct. 15, 2019	The TODAY Show	"Cyntoia Brown-Long and her husband discuss life after prison"
Oct. 15, 2019	Associated Press	"Ex-inmate Cyntoia Brown-Long argues for redemption in memoir"
Oct. 16, 2019	CBS News	"Cyntoia Brown-Long on redemption and life after prison"
Oct. 17, 2019	The Breakfast Club	"Cyntoia Brown-Long Talks Meeting Her Husband While In Prison, Healing Post Release, & More"
Oct. 17, 2019	The Daily Show with Trevor Noah	"Cyntoia Brown-Long - "Free Cyntoia" and Living Her Dream After Prison "
Oct. 18, 2019	Democracy Now!	"Sentenced to Life in Prison as a Teen, How Cyntoia Brown Survived Sex Trafficking & Won Her Freedom"
Oct. 19, 2019	Jesus Calling	"Cyntoia Brown-Long: Finding True Freedom in Faith"
Oct. 20, 2019	MSNBC	"Cyntoia Brown-Long shares story of redemption, life after prison"
Oct. 25, 2019	BBC Radio 4	"Woman's Hour: Cyntoia Brown Long"
Oct. 28, 2019	CBS This Morning	"Cyntoia Brown-Long to her 16-year-old self: "God does hear you""
Oct. 30, 2019	Now This	"Cyntoia Brown-Long Turned Her Injustice into Power and Action for Prison Reform"
Nov. 11, 2019	TV One	"Sister Circle: Cyntoia Brown-Long Talks Triumph After Trauma"
Jan. 3, 2020	CNN	"Cyntoia Brown speaks about her freedom"
May 12, 2020	ExpediTIously Podcast	"Cyntoia Brown: Free At Last"
June 2, 2020	T.I. & Tiny: Friends & Family Hustle	"Cyntoia Brown Long and Tip Shed Light on Sex Trafficking"

== See also ==
- Sara Kruzan
- Chrystul Kizer
- Marissa Alexander case
