= Nikki Taylor =

Nikki Taylor may refer to:

- Nikki M. Taylor (born circa 1972), American historian
- Niki Taylor (born 1975), American model
