= Angela Brown =

American opera singer (born 1963)

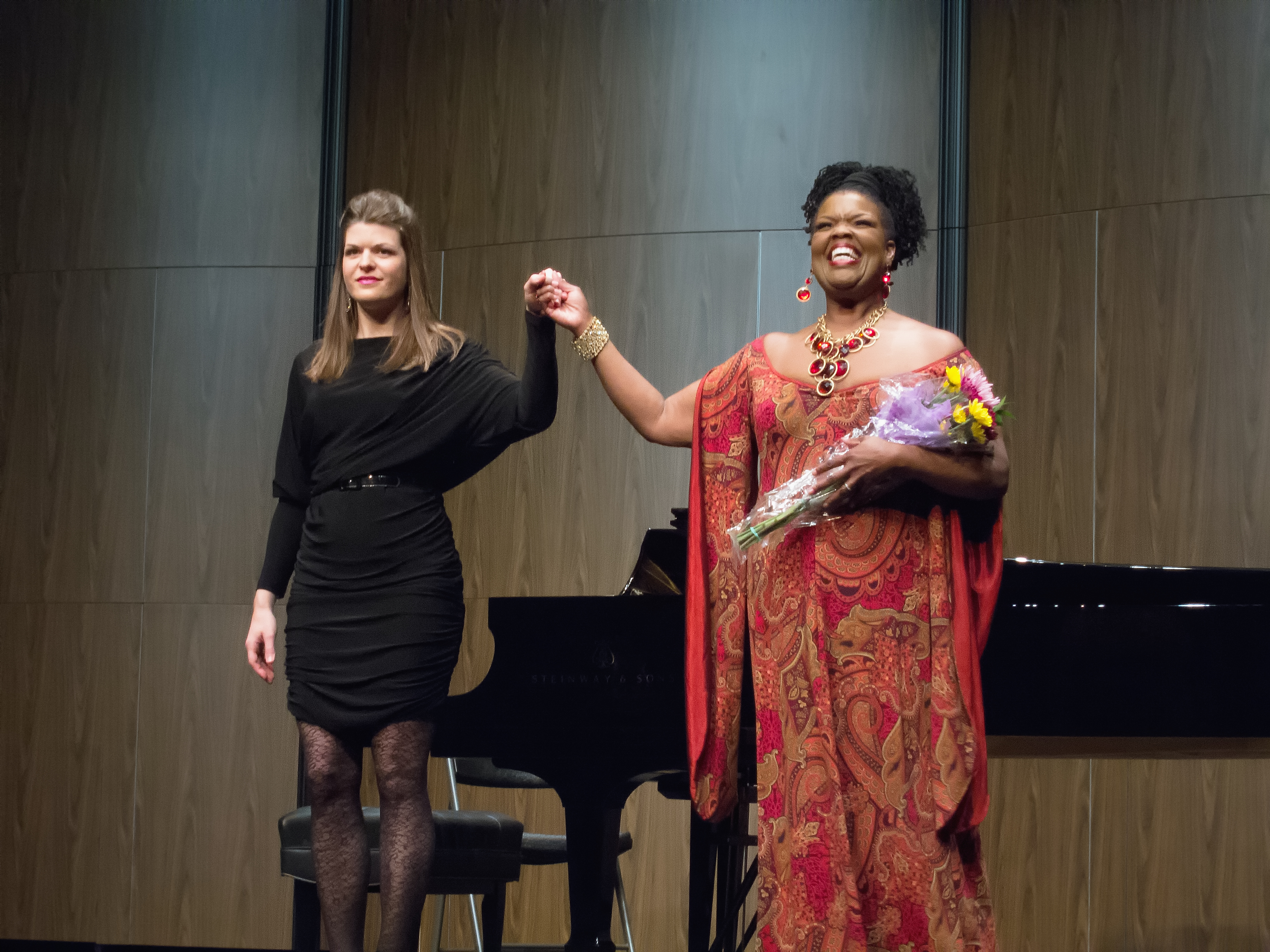
Angela Brown & Kelleen Strutz

Angela M. Brown (born 1963) is an American dramatic soprano particularly admired for her portrayal of Verdi heroines.

== Early life and education ==
Angela Brown was born in 1963 in Indianapolis, Indiana. She is African-American. Her mother, Freddie Mae Brown, was a painter, and her father, Walter Clyde Brown, was an autoworker at a Chrysler plant in Indianapolis for 41 years. Along with older brother George and younger brother Aaron, Brown was raised in a deeply spiritual Baptist household. Her grandfather was a Baptist minister in the city and Brown started singing at his church when she was 5 years old. Brown credits her musical experiences at church as instilling in her a love for singing.

As a teenager, Brown started performing in soul music bands around Indianapolis and was highly active in the vocal music program at Crispus Attucks High School. Her high school choir director, Robert Fleck, taught Brown her first classical arias and entered her in several local music competitions, all of which Brown won. Brown also participated in her high school's musicals, playing Adelaide in Guys and Dolls among other roles.

After high school, Brown attended a community college in Indianapolis part-time while working a day job as a dietary aide at Methodist Hospital. She also acted in several musicals at the pro-am Civic Theater where she got to work with several notable performers including Ginger Rogers. Brown also worked as a singing waitress for a time.

The death of her younger brother led Brown, then 20, to re-examine her faith and join the Seventh-day Adventist Church with intent to become a singing evangelist. To that end, in the fall of 1986, at the age of 21, Brown enrolled at Oakwood College planning to major in biblical studies with a minor in music. Brown subsequently changed her major to music, however, after her voice teacher, Ginger Beazley, convinced her to pursue opera singing instead. Brown received a bachelor's degree in the Spring of 1991.

From 1992 to 1997, Brown continued her studies at the Jacobs School of Music at Indiana University with noted voice teacher Virginia Zeani. Brown had worked frequently with Zeani while at Oakwood College, as Ginger Beazley took Brown and her other students up to IU to participate in Zeani's master classes.

While in graduate school, Brown began competing in several notable music competitions. In 1994 Brown tried out for the National Council Auditions of New York's Metropolitan Opera. She made it as far as the regional finals but proceeded no further. She tried out two more years in a row, only to be stopped twice more at the regional level. She tried one last time in 1997. "I had nothing to lose," she told The New York Times. Instead, she won everything - not only the regionals, but the semi-finals and then the finals. The win bought her entry into the world of professional opera.

Brown has since gone on to win the 2000 Richard Tucker Career Grant, a 1998 Sullivan Foundation Grant, the 1998 G.B. Viotti Verdi Vocal Competition, and the 1998 Opera Carolina Competition.

== Career ==
In 1997, Brown moved to New York City and began performing in a steady stream of small roles with larger opera companies and larger roles with smaller opera companies over the next several years. She also appeared in concerts with good regional orchestras and gave many recitals.

In the 2000–2001 season, Brown performed with the San Antonio Symphony, Teatro La Fenice, as Serena in Porgy and Bess with Opera Company of Philadelphia, and gave several recitals. She also began working for the Metropolitan Opera as a cover artist for the title roles of Verdi's Aida and Strauss' Ariadne auf Naxos. This was followed by cover work for the company for the next three seasons.

In the 2001–2002 season, Brown appeared as the Fourth Maid in Cincinnati Opera's production of Strauss' Elektra.

In the 2002–2003 season, Brown performed at the Kimmel Center with the Philadelphia Orchestra for the September 11 Memorial Concert, return trips to the Metropolitan Opera to cover the roles of Aida and Ariadne, covering Leonora in Il Trovatore for San Francisco Opera, performances of Richard Strauss’ Four Last Songs with the El Paso Symphony and Muncie Symphony Orchestras, and Beethoven’s Ninth Symphony with Roanoke Symphony Orchestra.

In the 2003-2004 season, Brown performed the roles of Elisabetta in Verdi's Don Carlo and Leonora in Verdi's Il Trovatore for the Opera Company of Philadelphia, the title role in Verdi's Aida for Shaker Mountain Opera, and the role of Cassandra in Taneyev's Agamemnon with the Manhattan Philharmonic and the Aquila Theater Company which toured Poland and was performed at her Carnegie Hall debut . She also performed a concert of Strauss and Wagner arias with the Auckland Philharmonia, was a soloist in Verdi's Requiem with the Louisville Orchestra, and a soloist with the Gibraltar Philharmonic. In addition, Brown made an unexpected appearance with the Opera Company of Philadelphia when she filled in at the last minute in the title role of Strauss' Ariadne auf Naxos. Brown also filled in for an ailing singer for an orchestra rehearsal of Aida at the Metropolitan Opera. The company was so impressed with her work that they immediately called Brown's agent and booked her for two performances of Aida and 12 cover performances for the next season.

In the 2004-2005 season, Brown made her critically acclaimed debut at the Metropolitan Opera in the title role of Verdi's Aida. Her performance was so well received that an article about her appeared on the front page of The New York Times on November 8, 2004. Originally she was not scheduled that night to sing, as she had already sung two performances in the scheduled run of Aida and covering the role for the remainder of the run, but she was called to replace the ailing lead that night. Opera News called her performance that of "one of America’s most promising Verdi sopranos". In addition, Brown sang the role of Aida for Opera Company of Philadelphia and followed that with the world premiere of Margaret Garner, a new opera by Richard Danielpour and Toni Morrison, in the role of Cilla for Michigan Opera Theatre and Cincinnati Opera. She also appeared as a guest soloist in a concert of opera arias for Auckland Philharmonia (New Zealand) and Dayton Opera.

In the 2005–2006 season, Brown performed the role of Amelia in Verdi's Un Ballo in Maschera and the role of Cilla in Margaret Garner for the Detroit Opera and Opera Company of Philadelphia, the title role in Verdi's Aida for Opera Pacific and Florentine Opera, Verdi's Requiem for the Festival of Saint Denis in France, concerts with the Indianapolis Symphony and Brevard Festival Orchestra, and recitals throughout the United States.

In the 2006–2007 season, Brown made her debut with Opéra National de Paris as Amelia in Verdi's Un Ballo in Maschera, sang the title role of Verdi's Aida with Florida Grand Opera for the opening the new Carnival Performing Arts Center, and sang the role of Bess in Gershwin's Porgy and Bess for both Opera Pacific to open the new Orange County Performing Arts Center and the Opera Company of Philadelphia to mark the 150th Anniversary of the Academy of Music.

In the 2007–2008 season, Brown sang the title role of Aida and the role of Amelia in Verdi's Un Ballo in Maschera at the Metropolitan Opera. She was also chosen by The Library of Congress as the featured soloist for the 2008-2009 National Celebration of the Bicentennial of Abraham Lincoln in February. In addition, Brown sang in concert at Dayton Opera, performed with the Indianapolis Symphony, sang Aida with Opera de la ABAO, the title role in Puccini's Tosca with Florida Grand Opera, and gave her first appearance in the role of Leonora in a concert version of La Forza del Destino with James Conlon for the Cincinnati May Festival. This summer Brown will perform Verdi's Requiem with the National Symphony of Spain in Madrid, give a concert of sacred repertoire at St. Patrick's Cathedral in Auckland, New Zealand, and will be the featured performer at the NAACP's national conference in July 2008.

In the 2008–2009 season, Brown sang Aida for Cape Town Opera in South Africa and for the Latvian National Symphony in Riga. She celebrated Christmas with the Alabama Symphony Orchestra in Alabama and the Southwest Michigan Symphony. In addition, she sang Aida at her debut with the Deutsche Oper Berlin, Leonora in Il Trovatore for her debut with Atlanta Opera, Amelia in Un Ballo in Maschera for National Opera of Paris, and Elisabetta in Don Carlo for Cincinnati Opera, and performed Verdi's Requiem in Barcelona.

Brown has also performed roles with the Indianapolis Opera.

She has performed in concert with the San Antonio Symphony, Tulsa Philharmonic, Indianapolis Symphony, Cincinnati Pops, Brevard Festival Orchestra, Knoxville Symphony, Long Island Philharmonic, Asheville Lyric Opera's 10th Anniversary GalaHendersonville Symphony, Chautauqua Institution, the Kennedy Center's 25th Anniversary Celebration, Chicago Sinfonietta, The Joy of Music Television Series and tours throughout United States, Canada, New Zealand, Italy, and Africa.

She has given recitals in such places as Alice Tully Hall and Carnegie Hall.

== Educator and humanitarian ==
Angela M. Brown has been a spokesperson for the United Negro College Fund and uses her voice to bring awareness of opera to minority audiences, communities and diverse young audiences. Since 2002, she has frequently given free concerts entitled Opera...from A Sistah's Point of View with fellow opera singer Kishna Davis to help everyday people connect with opera.

== Discography ==
2014 This Christmas - recording of Christmas selections produced by Roger Ryan and Aftertouch Music 2010 Opera...from a Sistah's Point of View - live recording of arias, art songs and spiritual from the Musical Arts Center of Indiana University on the IMI label

- 2004 Mosaic - recording of African-American spirituals with pianist Joseph Joubert on the Albany Records label (www.albanyrecords.com)
- 1997 recording and performances with the Cincinnati Pops Orchestra - Erich Kunzel, conductor (Serena selections from Porgy and Bess and world-premier recording of "Lonely Boy" from the original score) release TelArc May 1998
- 1997 Guest Artist on The Joy of Music Television Series - on location in Heidelberg, Germany
- 1997 Guest Artist on the Hour of Power International Television Program (Crystal Cathedral, California)
- 1995 solo compact disc recording with Charles Webb pianist and dean emeritus of Indiana University School of Music
