= Margaret Garner (opera) =

African-American-themed opera

- Opera by Richard Danielpour
- Librettist: Toni Morrison
- Language: English
- Premiere: 7 May 2005; Detroit Opera House

Margaret Garner is an opera in two acts composed by Richard Danielpour to an English-language libretto by Toni Morrison. The opera is loosely based on actual events in the life of runaway slave Margaret Garner. A co-commission by the Michigan Opera Theatre, Cincinnati Opera and Opera Philadelphia, it premièred on 7 May 2005 at the Detroit Opera House in Detroit, Michigan with Denyce Graves in the title role.

== Background and performance history ==
Morrison previously used the historic Margaret Garner as the inspiration for her novel Beloved. This is one of a few operas written about the African-American experience; other notable examples are George Gershwin's Porgy and Bess (1935), Scott Joplin's Treemonisha (1910/1972) and Anthony Davis’s X: The Life and Times of Malcolm X (1985/86) and Amistad (1997/2008).

The opera explores themes of freedom and personal and community relationships, and makes some use of the African-American musical tradition of spirituals. It was the first libretto for the author and the first opera for the composer. Danielpour began work on the opera in 1998. The opera premièred on May 7, 2005 in Detroit; it was performed in Cincinnati in July 2005, and Philadelphia in February 2006. The three companies spent more than $2 million on the opera. Denyce Graves sang the title role in the premiere run, which featured a cast of nearly one hundred, flaming torches, a hanging on stage, and black-powder pistols. The opera requires a large cast because of the requirement for separate African and Caucasian choruses to portray the slaves and slave-owners. Other members of the initial cast were Angela M. Brown as Cilla, Gregg Baker as Robert Garner, Rod Gilfry as Edward Gaines, Roger Honeywell as the Auctioneer and John Mac Master as Casey. Kenny Leon directed. Jessye Norman was originally cast as Cilla but withdrew and was replaced by Brown.

The opera has also been staged by Opera Carolina in Charlotte, North Carolina in 2006, the New York City Opera in 2007 and in Detroit and Chicago in 2008. National Public Radio broadcast the Opera Carolina production.

== Roles ==
Role	Voice type	Premiere Cast, 2005 (Conductor: Stefan Lano)
Margaret Garner, a slave	mezzo-soprano	Denyce Graves
Robert Garner, a slave, her husband	bass-baritone	Gregg Baker
Cilla, a slave, his mother	soprano	Angela M. Brown
Edward Gaines, the plantation owner	baritone	Rod Gilfry
Caroline, his daughter	soprano	Kelly Kaduce
George Hancock, her fiancé, later husband	tenor	Jonathan Boyd
An auctioneer	tenor	Roger Honeywell
Casey, the overseer	tenor	John Mac Master
Three judges	tenor, baritone, and bass-baritone	
Black slaves, white slave-owners

== Synopsis ==
The plot follows the slave Margaret Garner as a new master comes to Maplewood, the Kentucky plantation where she is held. Margaret catches her new owner's eye and is brought in to work in the "big house", while her husband Robert is rented out to another farm. While the widowed plantation owner, Edward Gaines, sees Margaret as a sexual object, his daughter Caroline comes to see Margaret as a sort of foster mother. At Caroline's engagement party, a rift develops between Gaines and his daughter over her respect for Margaret.

Robert returns to escape with Margaret and his children; his mother Cilla refuses to go, claiming to be too old to learn the new habits of freedom. While they prepare to escape, the overseer Casey finds them and, after a struggle, Robert kills him. The couple and their two children flee, but are later found by Gaines and a posse. After a gun fight, Robert is captured and lynched. Margaret kills her two children to prevent them being returned to slavery, but she is taken alive.

Gaines forces a criminal trial where Margaret is charged with "destruction of property" for the killing of his slaves, her children. Caroline appeals to Gaines to advance the abolitionist agenda by having Margaret tried for murder instead, acknowledging the slaves' humanity. He refuses. After the guilty verdict and sentence of execution, Gaines fears losing Caroline. Believing he acted as a "proper" gentleman, he obtains a commutation for Margaret if she admits her guilt. Ignoring him, Margaret steps voluntarily off the gallows.

== Historical accuracy ==
The opera is not historically accurate to the life and actions of Margaret Garner. There are several clear extensions of historical truth:

1. Robert Garner did not kill anyone, and was not lynched. In a shootout, he wounded two of the slave-hunters sent to recapture his family. He survived the escape and recapture, and fought on the Union side in the Civil War. He raised two sons, Tom and Sam, and died in 1871 from a chest injury he suffered while working on a ship.
2. Margaret Garner was pregnant at the time of her escape, and killed one of her children, Mary, when faced with recapture. Of the three other children, two sons, Tom and Sam, lived to maturity; a daughter Cilla was drowned at the age of ten months when she and Margaret were thrown overboard in a collision of their steamboat (headed for the slave market in New Orleans) with another ship.
3. Margaret was not hanged, and survived the ships' collision. She and her husband were sold to a plantation in Mississippi, where Margaret died of typhoid fever in 1858.
4. Margaret's trial was focused primarily on the Fugitive Slave Law of 1850, rather than on the killing of her daughter.
