= Marissa Alexander case =

American legal case involving self-defense

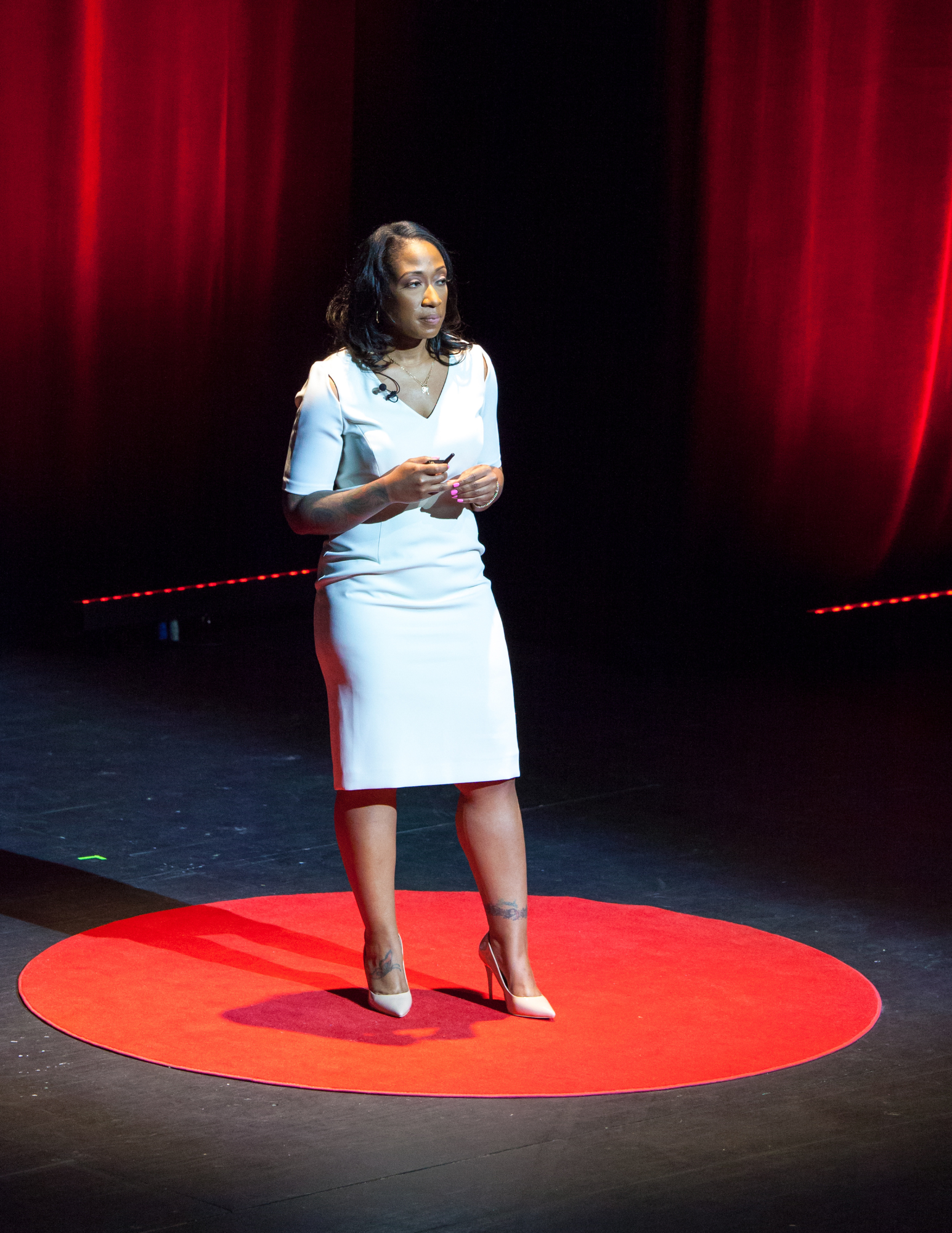
- Date: August 1, 2010
- Location: Jacksonville, Florida, U.S.
- Participants: Marissa Alexander (accused); Rico Gray (Alexander's husband)
- Accused: Marissa Alexander
- Charges: Aggravated assault with a deadly weapon (three counts)
- Verdict: Guilty on all counts

In May 2012, 31-year-old American Marissa Alexander was prosecuted for aggravated assault with a deadly weapon and received a mandatory minimum sentence of 20 years in prison. Alexander said that she fired a warning shot after her husband attacked her and threatened to kill her on August 1, 2010, in Jacksonville, Florida.

Some time after her conviction, a new trial was ordered. Before the new trial could begin, Alexander was released on January 27, 2015, under a plea deal that capped her sentence to the three years she had already served.

== Incident ==
Alexander was in the home of her estranged husband Rico Gray, when Alexander claimed that Gray threatened to kill her via texts on Alexander's phone. Gray had previously abused Alexander, giving her reason to believe that her life was in danger.

According to Alexander, she tried to escape through the garage, but the garage door would not open. This account was confirmed by Gray in a sworn deposition, although investigators found no problem with the door. According to all accounts, Alexander then retrieved her gun from her vehicle and went to the kitchen. Alexander fired a "warning shot" towards Gray with his children nearby, which hit the wall near Gray at the height of his head, then deflected into the ceiling. The single shot did not injure anyone. According to one source, Alexander had fired the warning shot because of Florida's stand-your-ground law, a law that allows self-defense, such as lethal force, in life-threatening situations, but the court later disagreed.

== Trials ==
Alexander, who had a history of suffering domestic violence from Gray, and had been previously accused of domestic violence herself, and who had recently been released from jail, returned to Gray's house, despite him having a restraining order forbidding her presence at the house, sought self-defense immunity prior to trial but was unsuccessful. State Attorney Angela Corey met with the defendant and offered her a three-year plea deal. Asserting that she acted in self-defense within the bounds of the law, Alexander rejected the offer and took her case to trial. A jury convicted her in twelve minutes, and because of the Florida 10-20-Life mandatory minimum statute, she was sentenced to 20 years in prison. Alexander was also required to stay away from Gray as part of a court order.

On September 26, 2013, an appellate court ordered a new trial, finding that the jury instructions in Alexander's trial impermissibly shifted the burden of proof from the prosecution to the defense. Alexander was released on bail on November 27, 2013 and required to stay under house arrest. Corey announced that she intended to re-prosecute Alexander, this time aiming for three consecutive 20 year sentences, amounting to a mandatory 60-year sentence if Alexander is found guilty in a second trial.

Marissa Alexander retained legal and investigative assistance during her second trial that she did not prior to her first trial, including a partner at the law firm of Holland & Knight, private investigator Patrick McKenna, and digital collections and forensics through Capsicum Group.

On January 27, 2015, Alexander was released from the Montgomery Correctional Center under a plea deal that capped her sentence to the three years she had already served. She pleaded guilty to three counts of aggravated assault for firing a shot in the direction of her husband. She also agreed to serve two years of house arrest, wearing an ankle monitor. She will be allowed to work, attend classes and take her children to school and medical appointments. Her case helped to inspire a new state law permitting warning shots in some circumstances.

== Criticism of prosecutor Angela Corey ==
Corey was criticized for her handling of the case by Democratic Florida Congresswoman Corrine Brown, who argued that Corey overcharged Alexander and the result of Alexander's case was a consequence of institutional racism. Mariame Kaba, Rev. Jesse Jackson, anti-domestic violence advocates, civil rights groups, and others also supported the call for Alexander's release from prison. Several groups such as the National Organization for Women (NOW) and the national advocacy group Color of Change petitioned to ask for Corey's removal from this case. NOW called for Corey to resign over the case, saying Corey was "misusing her office and endangering domestic violence survivors." Color of Change stated that they would attempt to collect 100,000 signatures to remove Corey from the case.

Corey has defended herself by saying that she believes Alexander fired the weapon out of anger and not fear, and that she endangered the lives of Gray's two children in the process. Corey said, "She discharged a gun to kill them."

== Aftermath ==
In March 2017, Alexander expressed support for reducing minimum sentencing laws and speaking on behalf of women who suffered domestic abuse. She also spoke in favor of strengthening the Stand Your Ground law with the intent of making it more fair and balanced.

Due to efforts by prison abolitionists such as Mariame Kaba and others to free Alexander, the organization Survived and Punished was created to free women who are incarcerated for defending themselves and their children from intimate partner violence.

Alexander completed community supervision in 2017. She became a public speaker and advocate for domestic violence prevention. In 2019, she presented the TEDx FSCJ talk Not Another Victim: I'm an Empowered Survivor.

== See also ==
- Mariame Kaba
- Cyntoia Brown
- Chrystul Kizer
- Courtney Schulhoff
- Sara Kruzan
