= Wisconsin v. Kizer =

Criminal case in Kenosha, Wisconsin

- Court: Wisconsin Supreme Court
- Full case name: State of Wisconsin v. Chrystul D. Kizer
- Decided: July 6, 2022 (interlocutory)
- Citations: State v. Kizer, 403 Wis.2d 142 (2022).

Case history
- Appealed from: Wisconsin circuit courts
- Appealed to: Wisconsin Court of Appeals (State v. Kizer, 398 Wis.2d 697 (2021).)
- Subsequent action: Remanded for trial

Case opinions
- Wis. Stat. 939.46(1m) is a complete defense to first-degree intentional homicide; defined "directly related"
- Decision by: Dallet (with A. Bradley and Karofsky)
- Concurrence: R. Bradley
- Dissent: Roggensack (with Ziegler and Hagedorn)

Wisconsin v. Kizer is a murder case in which the deceased's alleged sex trafficking of the defendant was raised as an affirmative defense, for the first time in Wisconsin and possibly anywhere in the United States.

The defendant, Chrystul Kizer, a 17-year-old Black girl, was arrested in 2018 for the murder of Randall Phillip Volar III, a 34-year-old white man who had abused and trafficked Kizer and dozen other Black girls in Kenosha, Wisconsin. Kizer sought to raise an affirmative defense under a Wisconsin statute (Wis. Stat. s. 939.46) that shields trafficking victims from prosecution for crimes that are a direct result of the trafficking.

The trial court ruled that the affirmative defense did not apply to violent crimes, but the ruling was overturned on appeal, allowing Kizer to present evidence of her trafficking at trial. Since the ruling was overturned, supporters have renewed calls for charges against Kizer to be dismissed.

Kizer's case has received international attention, especially after the George Floyd protests triggered renewed focus on criminal justice reform. The case has been compared to similar cases involving claims of self-defense, such as George Zimmerman and Kyle Rittenhouse, who were acquitted (the latter of which also took place in Kenosha), and Cyntoia Brown, another black child sex trafficking victim, who spent 15 years in prison.

Kizer was initially held on $1 million bail and spent almost two years in jail before her bail was lowered to $400,000, which community activists paid, securing her release in June 2020. She was re-arrested in February 2024 after her bail was revoked for having been charged with misdemeanor disorderly conduct while out on bail.

On May 9, 2024, Kizer pled guilty to one felony count of second-degree reckless homicide, which carries a maximum sentence of 25 years in prison. On August 19, she was sentenced to 11 years in prison.

== Background ==

In 2017 in Kenosha, Wisconsin, Chrystul Kizer, a 16-year-old Black girl, met Randall P. Volar III, a 33-year-old white man, on Backpage. Volar abused and trafficked Kizer and other underage Black girls. In February 2018, a 15-year-old girl called police from Volar's home saying Volar had drugged her and was going to kill her; the girl was later found by police wandering the streets half-naked under the influence of LSD. A subsequent search of Volar's home found evidence of child sex abuse, including hundreds of videotapes of Volar abusing Kizer and other underage Black girls. On February 22, Volar was arrested for child enticement, second-degree sexual assault of a child, and using a computer to facilitate a child sex crime. He was released on the same day without bail. Police waited three months before submitting the case to prosecutors. Twelve days later, on June 5, while still free on bail, Volar was shot and killed by Chrystul Kizer.

== Court proceedings ==
=== Arrest and bail ===
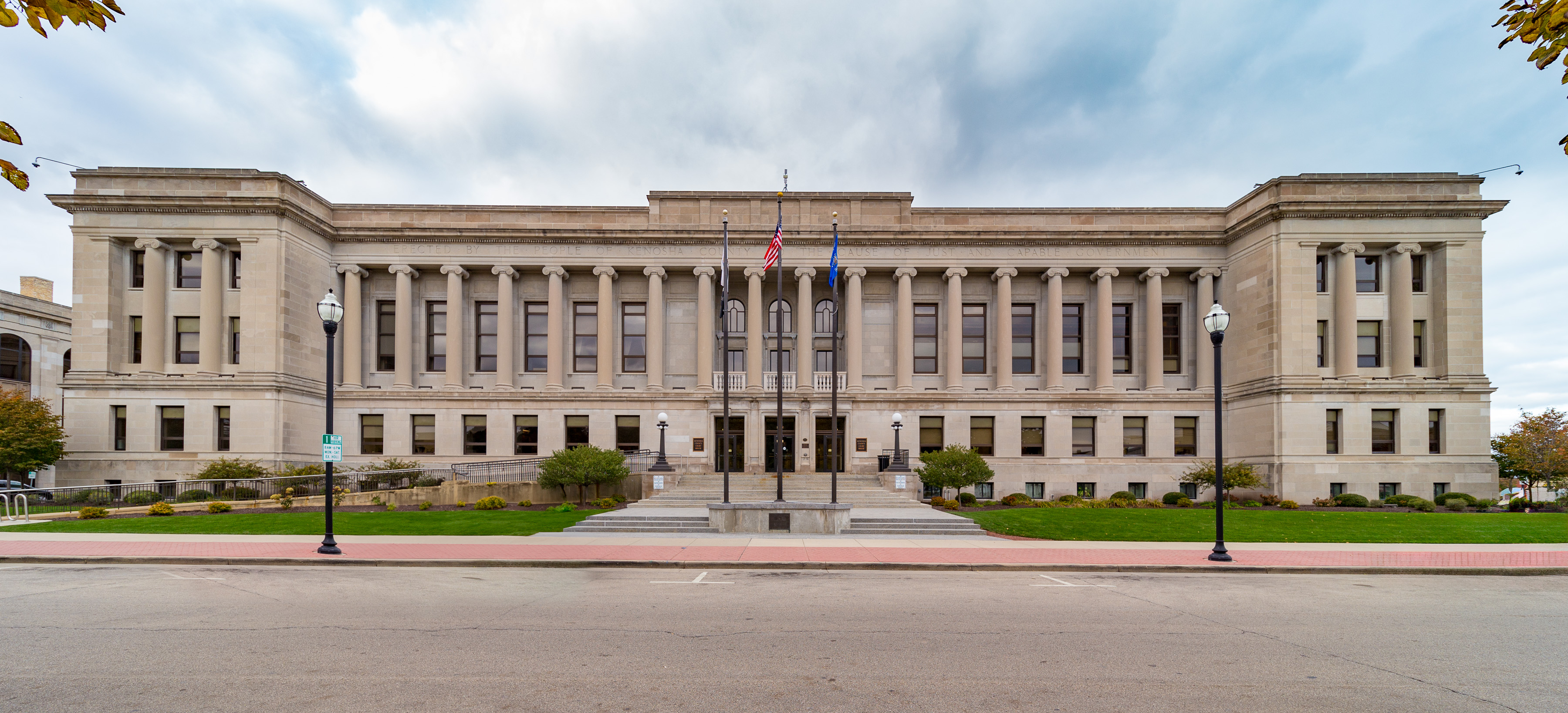
Kizer's case is pending in the Kenosha County Courthouse and Jail

In 2018, Kizer, then 17 years old, was arrested for Volar's murder and charged as an adult with first-degree intentional homicide, which carries a mandatory life sentence. She was also charged with arson for setting fire to Volar's house, and with car theft for stealing Volar's car, among other charges. Kizer's bail was originally set at $1 million.

In February 2020, Kenosha County Circuit Court Judge David Wilk lowered Kizer's bail to $400,000. Kizer paid the bail with community donations raised by the Chicago Community Bond Fund, the Milwaukee Freedom Fund, Survived and Punished, and the Chrystul Kizer Defense Committee, and was released on June 22, 2020, after spending nearly two years in jail.

=== Affirmative defense ===
Kizer invoked a Wisconsin statute (Wis. Stat. s. 939.46) that provides trafficking victims with "an affirmative defense for any offense committed as a direct result of" the trafficking. Paragraph "1m" of the statute reads:

A victim of a violation of s. 940.302 (2) human trafficking or 948.051 child trafficking has an affirmative defense for any offense committed as a direct result of the violation of s. 940.302 (2) or 948.051 without regard to whether anyone was prosecuted or convicted for the violation of s. 940.302 (2) or 948.051.

Prosecutors argued that the affirmative defense did not apply, and alleged that Kizer shot Volar not as a direct result of the trafficking but because she wanted to steal his car. Kenosha County District Attorney Michael Graveley told The New York Times that "permitting vigilante justice, which is the narrative from some seeking dismissal, is a highly subjective, slippery slope".

In December 2019, Judge Wilk issued a ruling barring Kizer from raising the affirmative defense at trial because although the law used the specific words "any offense", applying it to violent crimes would be, in the court's words, "an absurd result". Wilk found the phrase "any offense" to be an "ambiguous" term, and ruled that it only applied to commercial sex crimes covered by Wisconsin's human trafficking law (s. 940.302 (2)), not its child trafficking law (s. 948.051). The trial court's ruling would have prohibited Kizer from telling the jury about Volar's abuse and trafficking. Kizer appealed.

The Wisconsin Court of Appeals overturned the trial court in June 2021, holding that the trial court had erred in its interpretation of the affirmative defense law, that the affirmative defense applied to any offense, including violent crimes, committed as a "direct result" of trafficking, and that Kizer could present evidence in support of the affirmative defense at trial. The appellate court ruled on the correct interpretation of the affirmative defense statute but not on whether it applied in the specific circumstances of Kizer's case, which was remanded back to the trial court. Prosecutors appealed.

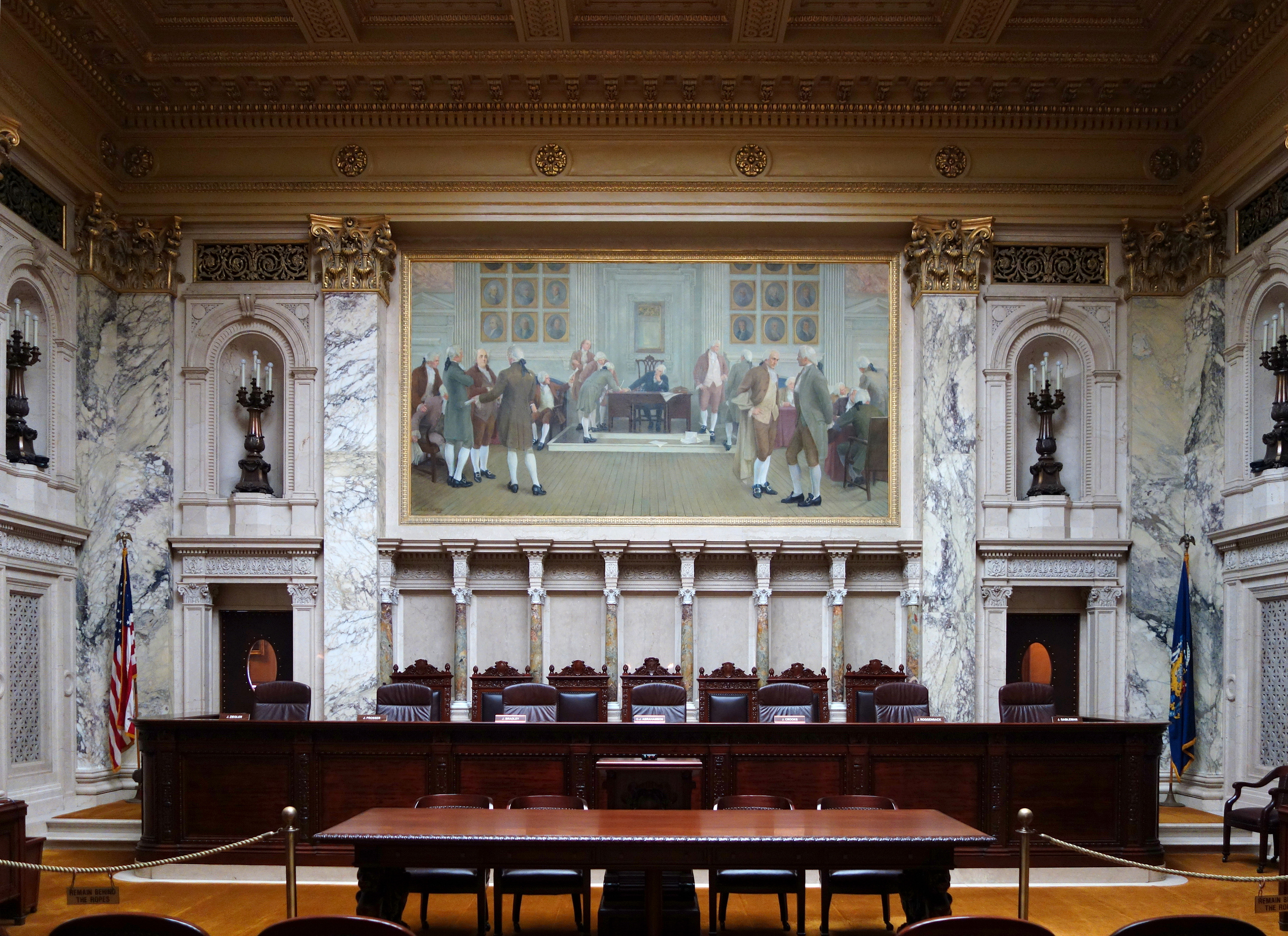
The justices of the Wisconsin Supreme Court sit beneath The Signing of the Constitution, a 1915 mural by Albert Herter

In July 2022, the state supreme court upheld the appeals court's decision overturning the trial court's ruling that barred Kizer from raising the affirmative defense. In a 4-3 opinion, the Wisconsin Supreme Court held that the law provided trafficking victims with an affirmative defense to any offense, including violent crimes, committed as a direct result of the trafficking. The court defined "committed as a direct result" as a "logical, causal connection between the offense and trafficking such that the offense is not the result, in significant part, of other events, circumstances, or considerations apart of the trafficking violation". The court also held that the affirmative defense law was a "complete defense" to criminal liability, and not just a "mitigating defense" that would lower the first-degree murder charge to a second-degree murder charge. The court ruled that Kizer should be allowed to present evidence at trial that her actions were a direct result of being trafficked, and remanded the case back to the trial court.

=== Post-appeal ===
In October 2023, the trial court ruled that statements Kizer made during her interrogation by the police were not admissible because she did not receive a Miranda warning and her attorney was not present.

In January 2024, Kizer was charged with a misdemeanor for disorderly conduct. Her bail was revoked, and on February 13, 2024, she was re-arrested. Judge Wilk set her new bail at $750,000.

On May 9, 2024, Kizer pled guilty to one felony count of second-degree reckless homicide, which carries a maximum sentence of 25 years in prison. Kizer's decision to plead guilty ensured she would not receive a life sentence. As part of the deal, felony charges of arson, car theft, illegal possession of a firearm, and bail jumping were dismissed. On August 19, Kizer was sentenced to 11 years in prison, with more than a year and a half of time already served, plus 5 years of extended supervision. Kizer is currently incarcerated at the Taycheedah Correctional Institution.

== Analysis ==
Wisconsin v. Kizer is the first time the trafficking victim affirmative defense has been raised in a violent crime case in Wisconsin and likely in any other US state with a similar law. Although the Wisconsin Supreme Court's ruling only applies in Wisconsin, it could set a precedent for the application of similar laws elsewhere in the United States.

Philosopher Susanna Siegel cites the case as an example of self-defense being mischaracterized as vigilantism, contrasting it with the cases of George Zimmerman and Kyle Rittenhouse. According to Seigel and philosopher Ayanna Spencer, the case is an example of prosecutors using vigilante rhetoric to cast child trafficking victims as criminals who ignore the law.

Historian Nikki M. Taylor, law professor Lisa Avalos, and others, cite Kizer's case as an example of the police and courts' mistreatment of, failure to protect, and lack of sympathy towards, victims of sex trafficking.

Writing in the Harvard Journal of Law and Gender, Brianna N. Banks cites Kizer's case as an example of the ineffectiveness of the federal Victims of Trafficking and Violence Protection Act of 2000 (TVPA) as applied in practice, pointing to legal authorities' failure to provide Kizer and Volar's other underage victims with TVPA protections.

Both Spencer and Banks cite the case as an example of sociopolitical biases that cause Black girls to be perceived as adults, older and more sexually mature than they actually are.

Taylor and Banks compare Kizer's case with Cyntoia Brown, describing both as examples of Black women and girls being punished for protecting themselves after the criminal justice system has failed to protect them.

Banks writes that both cases demonstrate racial disparities and biases in the criminal justice system's failure to view Black girls as victims of abuse, treating them instead as "complicit in their own exploitation" (despite being under the age of consent) and "more culpable than the men who purchase their bodies". Banks writes that implicit biases dating back to the slavery era that hypersexualize and devalue Black women and girls may have caused the trial court to prohibit Kizer from raising the affirmative defense at trial, and likely caused police and prosecutors to characterize Kizer and Volar's other victims as "voluntarily prostituting themselves-as if they themselves chose to be trafficking victims". Similarly, sex crimes expert Rachel Monaco-Wilcox stated that children of color are seen as willing participants in trafficking cases.

Taylor argues that "the judicial system tries to silence and prosecute survivors of modern slavery who take justice into their own hands by killing their enslavers", and that Kizer and Brown faced "many of the same pitfalls that enslaved women stumbled into hundreds of years earlier – specifically, judges that ignored what they had endured at the hands of cruel and abusive enslavers."

The case has also been cited as an example of the injustice of the cash bail system, as Kizer was able to be freed from jail only after her case became widely known and she garnered widespread support, paralleling the case of Kyle Rittenhouse who likewise was able to have a large bail in Kenosha County paid on his behalf because of crowdfunding. Both cases are outliers, as most impoverished defendants charged with serious and minor offenses remain in jail for months or years awaiting trial dates.

== Reactions ==
Kizer gave an interview to The Washington Post in December 2019. The case received global attention, sparking public debate about racial justice and the limits and merits of shield laws for sex trafficking victims. Public interest in the case increased following the George Floyd protests, which led to renewed interest in criminal justice reform and an influx of donations to organizations such as Chicago Community Bond Fund. Interest in her case renewed following the Kyle Rittenhouse trial (also in Kenosha) where the defense claimed self-defense and the jury delivered a not guilty verdict.

Anti-violence activists filed amicus curiae briefs on Kizer's behalf. Kizer's mother, Devore Taylor, formed the Chrystul Kizer Defense Committee to organize around the case and to raise bail money. Supporters wrote letters to Kizer. Cyntoia Brown-Long wrote an op-ed that outlined the similarities between their cases. Alyssa Milano and Tarana Burke were among those who circulated information about the case on social media.

DA Graveley posted a Facebook response to a Change.org petition for Kizer's release that stated that he would not be swayed by the petition. By September 2020, the petition had almost 1.5 million signatures.

Since the Wisconsin Supreme Court ruled that Kizer can raise the trafficking victim affirmative defense, the Free Chrystul Kizer campaign and other supporters have demanded that all charges against Kizer be dismissed.

After Kizer was sentenced to 11 years in prison, Claudine O’Leary, a trafficking survivor and activist, said that “Too often, these courts are looking for the perfect victim. And Chrystul did not fit the image of what they thought a perfect victim would look like...They didn’t understand the kinds of experiences Chrystul had early on, and so the court system is simply not prepared to support her.”

== See also ==
- Marissa Alexander case
- Sara Kruzan
- Adultification bias
- Battered woman syndrome
- Abuse defense

== Works cited ==
=== Scholarship ===
- Avalos, Lisa (September 1, 2020). "Reversing the Decriminalization of Sexual Violence". Nevada Law Journal. 21 (1): 1–60. (PDF Archived February 7, 2024, at the Wayback Machine)
- Banks, Brianna N. (2021). "The (De)Valuation of Black Women's Bodies". Harvard Journal of Law and Gender. 44: 329–363. Archived from the original on January 3, 2024. (TWL)
- Krell, Maggy; Dhanoa, Sharan (October 20, 2021). "Creating a Just Response for Survivors of Trafficking". Criminal Justice. American Bar Association. Archived from the original on February 7, 2024.
- Rein, Rachel (2022). "Suffering at the Margins: Applying Disability Critical Race Studies to Human Trafficking in the United States". Columbia Journal of Gender and Law: 183–256. doi:10.2139/ssrn.3925222. ISSN 1556-5068. S2CID 240268458. (TWL)
- Siegel, Susanna (2022). "Vigilantism and Political Vision". Washington University Review of Philosophy. 2 (2): 1–42. doi:10.5840/wurop202222. S2CID 251704942. (PDF Archived February 7, 2024, at the Wayback Machine)
- Spencer, Ayanna De'Vante (December 6, 2023). "Solidarity with Chrystul Kizer: On Disparate Failures of Knowledge-Attribution and Survivors of Sexual Violence". Hypatia. 38 (4): 707–725. doi:10.1017/hyp.2023.83. ISSN 0887-5367. S2CID 266069273. (TWL)
- Taylor, Nikki M. (July 13, 2023). Brooding over Bloody Revenge: Enslaved Women's Lethal Resistance. Cambridge University Press. ISBN 978-1-009-27684-9. Archived from the original on August 20, 2024. (TWL)
- Weston, Madeline (2022). "Committing Crimes Kept Her Alive: United States v. Dingwall and the Criminalization of Domestic Violence Victims". Wisconsin Journal of Law, Gender and Society. 37: 241–263. Archived from the original on August 21, 2024. (TWL)
- Vafa, Yasmin; Epstein, Rebecca (April 2023). Criminalized Survivors: Today's Abuse to Prison Pipeline for Girls (Report). Center on Gender Justice & Opportunity at Georgetown University Law Center. Archived from the original on February 7, 2024. (PDF Archived August 21, 2024, at the Wayback Machine)

=== Press ===
- "Milwaukee woman charged with killing abuser arrested in Louisiana". Associated Press. February 13, 2024.
- "Video, transcripts of Wisconsin woman's police interview cannot be used at her trial, judge rules". Associated Press. October 31, 2023. Archived from the original on February 8, 2024.
- "Wisconsin court: Sex trafficking can be defense for homicide". Associated Press. July 6, 2022. Archived from the original on February 8, 2024.
- "Woman accused of killing abuser freed on bond after 2 years". Associated Press. June 23, 2020. Archived from the original on February 8, 2024.
- Wisconsin Supreme Court justice argues that Chrystul Kizer is a victim (video). The Washington Post. March 3, 2022.
- Branigin, Anne; Contrera, Jessica (November 24, 2021). "After Rittenhouse, protesters are asking: What about sex-trafficking victim Chrystul Kizer?". The Washington Post. ISSN 0190-8286.
- Brooks, Ryan (June 23, 2020). "Chrystul Kizer, A 19-Year-Old Sex Trafficking Victim Who Killed Her Abuser, Has Been Released From Jail". BuzzFeed News. Archived from the original on July 17, 2020.
- Contrera, Jessica (June 23, 2020). "Chrystul Kizer, accused of killing her alleged sex trafficker, freed on bail after two years". Washington Post. ISSN 0190-8286. Archived from the original on December 7, 2022.
- ——— (February 7, 2020). "Judge reduces bond for Chrystul Kizer, teen charged with killing her alleged sex trafficker". Washington Post. ISSN 0190-8286. Archived from the original on May 8, 2021.
- ——— (December 31, 2019). "Activists, celebrities call for Chrystul Kizer's release in sex trafficking murder case". The Washington Post. Archived from the original on November 20, 2021.
- ——— (December 17, 2019). "He was sexually abusing underage girls. Then, police said, one of them killed him". The Washington Post. Archived from the original on May 28, 2023.
- Fortin, Jacey (June 23, 2020). "Chrystul Kizer, Teen Charged With Killing Sexual Abuser, Is Released on Bond". The New York Times. ISSN 0362-4331. Archived from the original on November 23, 2021.
- Gaitan, Daniel (May 9, 2024). "Chrystul Kizer pleads guilty in high-profile Kenosha homicide case". Kenosha News. Archived from the original on May 9, 2024.
- Lehr, Sarah (May 9, 2024). "Chrystul Kizer takes plea deal in Kenosha County homicide case". Wisconsin Public Radio. Archived from the original on August 21, 2024.
- O'Connell, Oliver (June 23, 2020). "US trafficking victim leaves jail after two years as activists raise $400,000 bail". The Independent. Archived from the original on May 25, 2022.
- Ramirez, Chris (May 9, 2024). "Chrystul Kizer pleads guilty in 2018 Kenosha County homicide, avoids possible life sentence". Milwaukee Journal Sentinel.
- Richmond, Todd (May 9, 2024). "Wisconsin woman who argued she legally killed sex trafficker pleads guilty to homicide". Associated Press. Archived from the original on May 13, 2024.
- Silver, Maayan (July 18, 2023). "A Wisconsin sex trafficking case could have nationwide impact". WUWM. Archived from the original on February 14, 2024.
- Shivaram, Deepa (November 25, 2021). "Rittenhouse's defense renews focus on the case of a 17-year-old who killed her abuser". NPR. Archived from the original on November 30, 2021.
