= Peggy Garner =

Peggy Garner may refer to:

- Peggy Ann Garner (1932–1984), American actress
- Margaret Garner, known as Peggy Garner, enslaved African-American woman in pre–Civil War America
