= Amistad =

Amistad ("friendship" in Spanish) may refer to:

== Places ==
- Amistad, New Mexico, US
- Amistad, Texas, US
- Amistad National Recreation Area, including the Amistad Reservoir, Texas
- Amistad Reservoir, a reservoir on the Rio Grande near Del Rio, Texas
- La Amistad International Park, a large International Park in Panama and Costa Rica

== Arts, media, and entertainment ==
- Amistad (publishing), an imprint of HarperCollins Publishing
- "Amistad", a working title for the song "You Found Me" by The Fray
- Amistad Memorial (New Haven), the memorial in New Haven, Connecticut recognizing the mutiny aboard La Amistad
- Mutiny on the Amistad: The Saga of a Slave Revolt and Its Impact on American Abolition, Law, and Diplomacy (1987), the historical account of the La Amistad mutiny by Howard Jones
- Amistad (film), a 1997 Steven Spielberg movie based on the events of the book

== Law ==
- United States v. The Amistad (1841), United States Supreme Court case deciding the fate of the captives who mutinied on the ship Amistad

== Ships ==
- Amistad/Amitie, an 18th-century schooner that transported Acadians from France to Louisiana
- La Amistad, a 19th-century Spanish schooner on which captured Africans meant for the slave trade rebelled in 1839 and took control; the case reached the US Supreme Court and was notable in the abolition movement
  - Freedom Schooner Amistad, a 1998 recreation of the original La Amistad schooner

== Other uses ==
- Amistad gambusia, an extinct fish that lived in springs now flooded by Amistad Reservoir in Texas
- Amistad Research Center, a research center at Tulane University, New Orleans, Louisiana devoted to research about slavery, civil rights, and African Americans that commemorates the revolt of slaves on the ship by the same name
- Amistad, a popular Award of Garden Merit cultivar of Salvia
