= Chicago Community Bond Fund =

Charity based in Chicago

The Chicago Community Bond Fund is a non-profit bail fund that through donations from the public posts bail bonds for people who could otherwise not afford it. Starting from an informal effort to bail out several people who were arrested at a vigil for a Black man who had been killed by the Chicago Police, the fund saw a considerable increase in donations following the murder of George Floyd and the protests and arrests in Chicago that followed. Taking a crime-agnostic view on providing bail, arguing that it is judges who determine if a person is a threat to the general public by offering cash bail and that the presumption of innocence applies to all, the fund has posted the bonds of hundreds of people accused of crimes, including a number charged with violent crimes.

The organization advocates for the end of cash bail for pretrial release and helped contribute to the effort to create and pass the Illinois Pretrial Fairness Act, a law that took effect in 2023 that abolished cash bail in Illinois.

== Founding ==
The Chicago Community Bond Fund was formally established in 2015 in reaction to police shootings of people of color in Chicago, growing out of an informal effort by members of the National Lawyers Guild to secure the release of several family members and friends of DeSean Pittman, a Black man who had been shot and killed by the Chicago Police, who had been arrested during and following a vigil in his honor in 2014. Eight people were arrested, with prosecutors later saying a near riot broke out with people chanting "kill the rookie", referring to a police officer claimed to have been the one to kill Pittman. LeKendra Lottie was charged with attempted murder, with the police claiming that she had driven her small SUV in to an officer, fracturing his leg. Lottie, who had not been attending the vigil but was picking up her two brothers who were, said the police had instigated the confrontation, breaking her back window and shouting at her to move along. While attempting to do so, Lottie said she tapped one of the officers, upon which she was immediately arrested by the police.

The first person to have their bond posted was Pittman's mother, one among the five charged with mob action, a day prior to her son's funeral which she otherwise would have missed. The last of the group, one of Pittman's cousins, had his bond posted in December after being held for four months, a period in which he had lost his job. In all, nearly $30,000 was raised to bail out all the people who were arrested at the vigil. By the end of 2016 the fund had bailed out fifty people, rising to 95 people by November 2017.

== Activities ==
Like many bail funds, CCBF works to put itself out of business by reforming bail practice to end the use of money bail altogether. The fund assists with class action lawsuits challenging bail practices and lobbying for expanded legal representation at bail hearings in Illinois. Sharlyn Grace, one of the founding members of the fund and the then executive director, told The New Republic that the early efforts that were focused on posting individual bonds made clear to the group that structural change was required, that they "very quickly realized that we could be on that hamster wheel forever. There was nothing about doing that alone that was going to change the system that created the need for a bail fund."

Following the murder of George Floyd and the arrests of hundreds of protestors in the resulting protests in Chicago, along with a substantial increase in individual donations, the fund paid the bails of 310 people in 2020, totaling 2.5 million dollars in bail. By April 2021, the fund had bailed out over 650 people with over four million dollars posted as bond. Higher profile cases had previously helped the bond fund raise awareness and funds, such as when the bond fund raised $45,000 within a day of Malcolm London being arrested at a protest for Laquan McDonald, a Black man who had been killed by a Chicago police officer.

The fund has put up bail for people outside of Cook County, and participated in efforts to raise funds for the bond of Chrystul Kizer, a Wisconsin woman who had been held for two years awaiting trial for the murder of the man who had sexually assaulted her along with a number of other young girls. The fund said at the time of Kizer's release in June 2020 that they had posted bail for eight other women they had identified as sexual abuse and trafficking victims who were being held on bail in what they called being "further harmed by prosecution."

Some of the people that have been bailed out by the bond fund were later charged with committing crimes while out on bail. The Chicago Tribune, using public record requests, examined 162 cases that it was able to confirm had bond posted by either the CCBF or by The Bail Project, another charity that posted cash bail for those that cannot afford it. Of the cases it looked at, a third were previous felons charged with being in possession of a gun and three were charged with murder. Jesse Jackson, who, along with his Rainbow/PUSH organization, had previously posted cash bail for people in Cook County but had excluded those charged with violent felonies, told the Tribune, explaining why he excluded such offenses, "Society would not appreciate that. That would not be acceptable". The charities responded that it is judges who determine if a person should be considered a threat to the public by denying bail. The executive director of the CCBF said "we're very clear whenever we're asked that we don't make distinctions based on charge" and that "the charge does not mean the person is a threat. The charge does not tell the story of who the person is and it should not be the sole determining factor in how they're treated pretrial." The CCBF said it had a 90% success rate in helping defendants it had bailed out to abide by court orders. In response to the Tribune article, Curtis Black of The Chicago Reporter wrote that the Tribune was "massaging data and ignoring larger contexts to create a highly skewed impression of what's at stake", and that the Tribune did not cite any evidence that those bailed out were any likelier to commit violent crimes than others. Black also said that the Tribune had "goosed its numbers" by including people who had committed a violent offense outside of the period where they would have been held in pre-trial detention.

== Illinois Pretrial Fairness Act ==
In 2016 the fund became a founding member of the Coalition to End Money Bond, a coalition of groups in the Chicago area working on mass incarceration and racial justice issues that lobbies and organizes to limit pre-trial detention and end cash bail in Illinois. A former executive director of the group, Sharlyn Grace, helped draft the Pretrial Fairness Act which would eliminate cash bail. The bill was introduced to the Illinois State Senate in 2020, though the COVID-19 pandemic caused the legislature to shut down. The act was reintroduced in January 2021 and passed as part of the SAFE-T Act, an ominbus crime and racial justice bill. Governor Jay Pritzker signed the bill into law in February 2021. Following several legal challenges and the Illinois Supreme Court upholding the law, the law went into effect throughout Illinois in September 2023, abolishing cash bail in the state. Pritzker described the bill as part of the efforts of "dismantling the systemic racism" in the criminal justice system. As of February 2021, Black people made up 73% of the inmate population in Cook County, while Latinos made up another 16%.
