= J. Long =

American musician and songwriter

J.Long
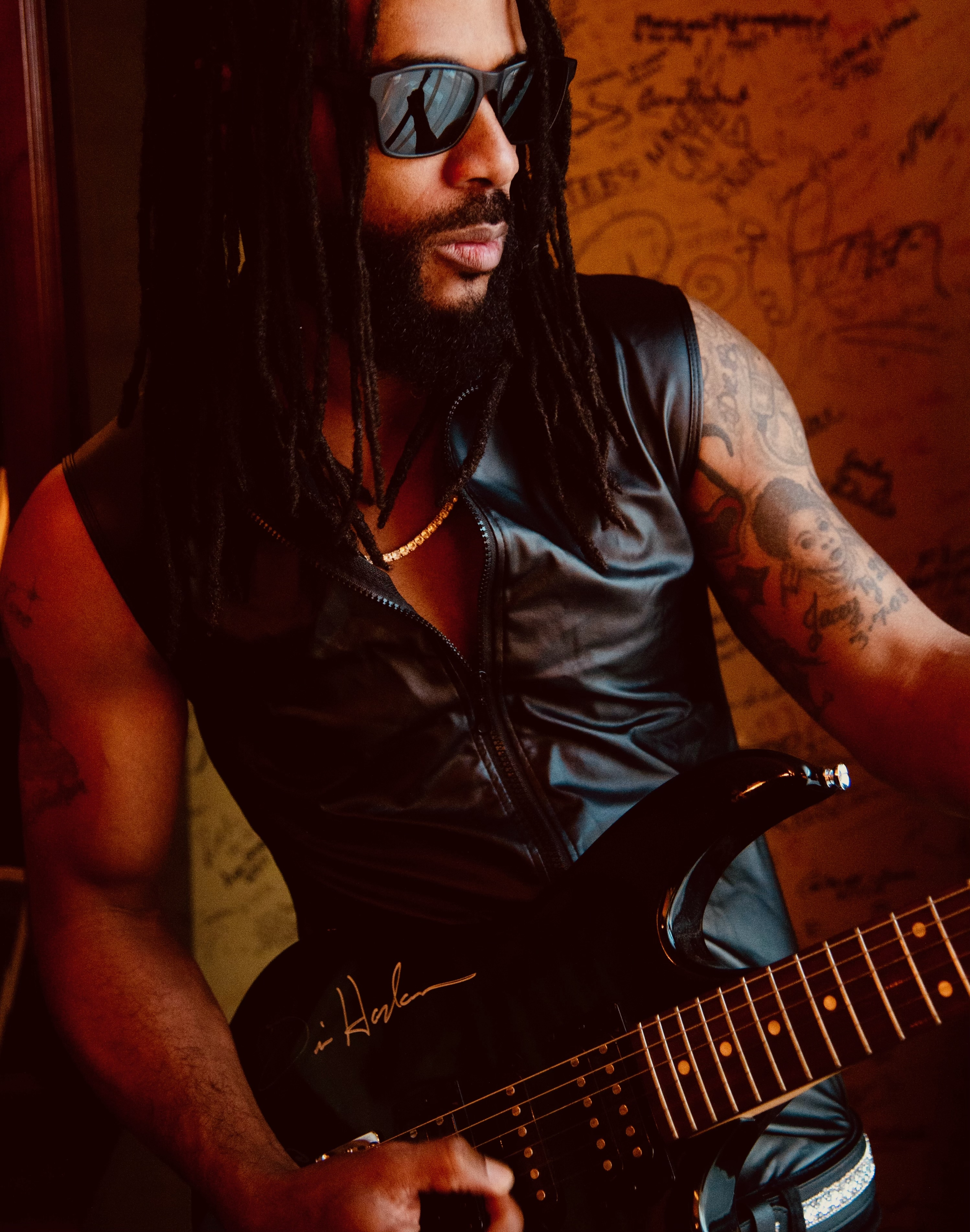

Background information
- Born: Jaime Lynn Long; June 10, 1985 (age 41); Galveston, Texas, U.S.
- Origin: La Marque, Texas, U.S.
- Genres: Christian rock; Funk; Gospel
- Occupations: Singer; Songwriter; Record Producer; Entrepreneur; Business Owner
- Years active: 2008–present
- Labels: J.Fam Music; Ice Age; ISOH Entertainment; BlueStar; JFAM ENT
- Spouse: Pamela Long (m. 2013; div. 2016) Cyntoia Brown (m. 2019)
- Relatives: Huey Long (uncle)

Jaime Lynn Long (born June 10, 1985), better known by his stage name J.Long, is an American Christian singer, songwriter & multi instrumentalist. He was a frequent collaborator with hip hop group Pretty Ricky, and also featured the group on his own song "Personal Freak". In April 2015, before departing from the music industry, Long toured one last time with his bandmates in Europe. He remained on hiatus until releasing new music in 2023.

== Early life ==
Long was born into a family of musicians. His uncle, Huey Long (1904–2009), was an African-American jazz and R&B guitarist of the pop group The Ink Spots. By age 17, he was selling beats recorded on equipment his stepfather, Melvin Hudnall, bought him. As he developed as an artist, he cited gospel quartet and the likes of musicians D'Angelo & Prince as a heavy influence. Long has since earned credits for singing, songwriting, producing.

== Career ==
Long signed his first record deal soon after graduating high school, joining NBA player Steve Francis's label ISOH Entertainment. In 2006, Long released his Six-10 mixtape through Mike Jones's Ice Age Entertainment label. His career began to take off with his 2008 single, "Berry Love". Long released his debut album Girl Listen in 2009, whose single "Personal Freak" hit #4 on Billboard. Other songs by Long feature artists Lil' Webbie and Juvenile. At one point, Long took a break from music for spiritual reasons. When he returned to the recording world, Long began to write and produce inspirational music, releasing an album entitled R & B (Redeemed and Blessed), featuring the single, "Jesus I Need You".

Long's solo record sales caught the attention of hip hop group Pretty Ricky, who were searching for a new singer to join the group. After signing with BlueStar Entertainment, Pretty Ricky did a remake of Long's highly successful Personal Freak. Long remained with the group from 2010 to 2012. During that time, he accompanied them on several tours, including BET's 106th & Park Tour. After he left the group in 2012, he later rejoined them on their European tour in April 2015.

In 2022, J. Long returned to the studio to record R&B (Redeemed and Blessed) Volume II. That album was released along with Couples Therapy Volume II and J.A.I.M.E. (Jesus Absolutely Is My Everything) in early 2023.

== Personal life ==
Long married singer Pamela Long from the girl group Total in 2013. Their divorce was finalized in February 2019.

In 2019, three years into their relationship, it was reported that Long married author and criminal justice advocate Cyntoia Brown, who had been convicted of robbing and murdering the person who bought her from sex trafficking. Wes Yoder, a representative for both Long and Brown, confirmed the marriage and stated that the details of how the two met could be found in Brown's memoir. The Tennessean later confirmed they had married over the phone by proxy while she was in prison.

Long, along with his wife, founded a nonprofit organization together in the fall of 2019. The Foundation for Justice, Freedom, and Mercy or The JFAM Foundation, exists to amplify narratives relating to social and criminal justice in the hopes that it can empower individuals who are at risk of exploitation or criminal justice system involvement. In addition to his work in the charitable sector, Long is owner of a Texas healthcare company.

=== Brazilian Jiu Jitsu ===
Long has training in Jiu Jitsu and has competed in martial arts tournaments. On his social media pages, Long has posted photos and videos showing that he is involved in Brazilian Jiu Jitsu, earning his brown belt in July 2026. In August 2020, he was named the winner of the Good Fight Tournament Feather weight division, and finished in second place of the Tournament Lightweight division.
