= Me Facing Life: Cyntoia's Story =

- Written by: Daniel H. Birman
- Directed by: Daniel H. Birman
- Narrated by: America Ferrera
- Country of origin: United States

Production
- Producer: Daniel H. Birman
- Cinematography: Daniel H. Birman; Erik Kaufmann
- Editors: David Eisenberg; Charlton McMillan
- Running time: 69 minutes
- Production companies: Daniel H. Birman Productions; ITVS

Original release
- Release: March 1, 2011

Me Facing Life: Cyntoia's Story is a documentary film about Cyntoia Brown, a 16-year old sentenced to 51 years for the murder of Johnny Allen. Brown had been forced into prostitution and involuntarily sex trafficked as a minor by Garion "Kut-Throat” McGlothen. Brown claimed she killed Allen in self-defense, adding she feared she was likely to be murdered by him. Prosecutors argued the physical evidence present at the crime scene suggested Allen was asleep at the time of the murder.

This film, detailing her arrest and subsequent conviction, was produced by Daniel H. Birman and premiered on PBS's Independent Lens series on March 1, 2011.

== Background ==
Cyntoia Brown (born 1988), the subject of the documentary, had been given up for adoption by her biological mother, Georgina Mitchell, when she was two years old. When Mitchell became pregnant with Cyntoia she continued consuming alcohol which may have resulted in fetal alcohol spectrum disorder. Mitchell began using crack cocaine when Cyntoia was eight months old, and she was given up to Ellenette Brown. The film suggests that although Ellenette Brown provided a generally stable home, Cyntoia didn't have sufficient stability in her life for proper emotional development, and by 2004 she had become a runaway.

By the time she was 16, Brown's encounters included many rapes, and assaults during or before being raped, and times when she was under the influence of drugs. Brown had a physically and sexually abusive pimp named "Kut-throat" (sometimes shortened to just "Kut"), who brandished guns at her and forced her into prostitution. Brown was picked up by a 43-year-old real estate agent, Johnny Allen, and taken to his house on August 6, 2004. Brown stated that for several weeks leading up to that day, she had been repeatedly raped and was on drugs. When she arrived at Allen's house, she found it contained several guns. Brown said that she was afraid that she would be shot, which led her to shoot and kill Allen. Brown was then arrested for Allen's murder. Her self-defense plea was not accepted by the jury because the victim was found with interlaced fingers under his face and a shot to the back of his head - the conclusion was that the victim was asleep at the time of death. Cyntoia Brown also admitted to executing the man on tape when speaking with her mother on the phone in custody.

== Description ==
Daniel Birman, the film's producer and director, documented Brown's case from the week of her arrest until her conviction almost six years later. Me Facing Life: Cyntoia’s Story delves into Brown's family background and her history to better understand the events leading up to the murder. Birman had been notified of the case by Kathy Evans in the Public Defender's Office. She requested an assessment by Dr. William Bernet, a juvenile forensic psychiatrist from Vanderbilt University. She was found to have had a difficult childhood, but was considered competent to stand trial, and therefore tried as an adult.

Prosecutors argued that her motive for killing Allen was robbery. This was, in part, due to video-recorded admissions Brown made during her arrest. Brown admitted to lying about her age when she first encountered her victim. Prosecutors further argued that while Allen slept, she pulled out a .40-caliber handgun from her purse and shot him in the head. Prosecutors raised the point that Brown premeditated the murder, because the victim was asleep, she had an opportunity to leave and chose not to. Brown later told investigators that Allen had reached for something and she feared for her life, but the prosecution claimed that the forensic evidence didn't support it and that Allen was asleep when he was shot dead with a gunshot wound to the back of his head. His hands were underneath his body and partially interlocked indicative of a person who is sleeping, according to police reports. When Brown left Allen's house, she took his wallet, guns, and his car.

Brown was sentenced to 51 years to life for first degree murder. The prosecutor of the case had argued for life without parole by stating the importance of ensuring that dangerous and violent people are imprisoned, regardless of the circumstances that may have arisen to make them violent. Brown is serving her sentence at the Tennessee Prison for Women. The film, which addresses harsh sentencing of minors, ends as Brown adjusts to life in prison. now she is trying to recover herself in doing better at life. Multiple jailhouse informants were used to show her as violent and dangerous, although she had no records of punishment nor formal records of infraction. She also had no history of previous violent crime.

== Aftermath ==
The documentary shown on PBS, and later picked up by BBC, generated interest in Brown's case. In April 2010, Charles Bone, a Nashville attorney, saw the film and decided to join Brown's attorneys on the case. They argued for a new trial, particularly to allow Brown to testify on her behalf, something that was discouraged by her attorneys in the original case, and to present evidence about her developmental delays due to fetal alcohol syndrome.

In November 2017, several celebrities, including rapper T.I., LeBron James, Rihanna, and Kim Kardashian, promoted her retrial and release, prompting many on social media to sign petitions demanding she be freed.

Brown was granted clemency on January 7, 2019, after serving 15 years in prison, by Gov. Bill Haslam of Tennessee. Cyntoia Brown was released on August 7, 2019.

== See also ==
- List of Independent Lens films
