= Cori Thomas =

American dramatist

Cori Thomas is a dramatist and screenwriter of Liberian and Brazilian descent. Her works include the plays When January Feels Like Summer, Lockdown, My Secret Language of Wishes, Pa's Hat, and Citizens Market. Cori is also a co-founder and the artistic director of San Quentin Film Festival. This is the first film festival to ever be held inside a prison.

== Early life ==
Thomas is the daughter of a Liberian ambassador and the granddaughter of Cora Ann Pair Thomas, who emigrated to Liberia as a missionary and founded the Lott Carey Mission.

== Career ==
The world premiere of Thomas's When January Feels Like Summer was directed by Chuck Patterson, her late husband, at the City Theatre in Pittsburgh in 2010 and won the American Theatre Critics Association Elizabeth Osborn New Play Award for an emerging playwright. It was subsequently co-produced by the Ensemble Studio Theatre and Page73 Productions in the Summer of 2014 in New York and directed by Daniella Topol. It was a Critics' Pick in The New York Times and was brought back in October 2014 as a co-production between the Ensemble Studio Theatre and the Women's Project Theater, also directed by Daniella Topol.

Other plays include Pa's Hat, which premiered at the Pillsbury House Theatre in Minnesota in 2010, directed by Marion McClinton; and My Secret Language of Wishes, which premiered at the Mixed Blood Theatre in 2011, also directed by McClinton.

In May 2019, her play Lockdown, directed by Kent Gash, was commissioned and produced at Rattlestick Playwrights Theater in New York City.

Thomas is the Andrew Mellon Playwright-In-Residence at WP Theater in New York City. She is also a New Dramatists alum.

Thomas is one of five playwrights to win the prestigious Helen Merrill Playwriting award.

Her fellowships and residencies include the 2008 Sundance Theatre Lab. O’Neill National Playwright’s Conference in 2018. And many other fellowships and residencies.

Thomas is the co-writer of Sara Kruzan's 2022 memoir, I Cried to Dream Again.
