= Murder to Mercy: The Cyntoia Brown Story =

2020 documentary film

- Film poster
- Directed by: Daniel H. Birman
- Produced by: Susy Garciasalas Barkley; Megan E. Chao
- Cinematography: Daniel H. Birman; Joel Winter
- Edited by: Megan E. Chao
- Music by: Jongnic Bontemps
- Production company: Daniel H. Birman Productions
- Distributed by: Netflix
- Release date: April 29, 2020
- Running time: 96 minutes
- Country: United States
- Language: English

Murder to Mercy: The Cyntoia Brown Story is a 2020 American documentary film directed by Daniel H. Birman. The premise revolves around Cyntoia Brown, who was 16 years old when she shot and killed Johnny Michael Allen in 2004.

== Release ==
Murder to Mercy: The Cyntoia Brown Story was released on April 29, 2020, on Netflix.
