= French ship Amitié =

History

France
- Name: Amitié

General characteristics
- Type: Frigate
- Tons burthen: about 400

The French ship Amitié (French for "Friendship"; later called Amistad) was a three-masted frigate of approximately 400 tons burthen in the late 18th century. Most records regarding the ship come from its transportation of the people later known as Cajuns. Amitié was the fifth of seven ships that took part in the exodus of Acadians from France to Louisiana in 1785. On August 20, under the command of Captain Joseph Beltrémieux, it departed from the French port of Nantes carrying 78 families, a total of 270 Acadians. They arrived at Lafourche Parish, Louisiana on November 8, 1785. Six passengers died during the 80-day voyage after sickness spread through the ship. Another 19 individuals are on the debarkation list who had not been recorded at the embarkation at Nantes.

The ship was called Amitié when it departed from France, but was referred to as Amistad when it arrived in Louisiana, which was then a Spanish colony.

== See also ==
- History of the Acadians
