= InTown Suites =

Chain of extended stay properties in the U.S.

- Type: Private
- Industry: Lodging, extended stay
- Headquarters: Atlanta, GA
- Number of locations: 196
- Website: www.intownsuites.com

InTown Suites is an American chain of extended stay properties in the United States, headquartered in Atlanta, GA. InTown Suites has 195 locations in 22 states.

== History ==
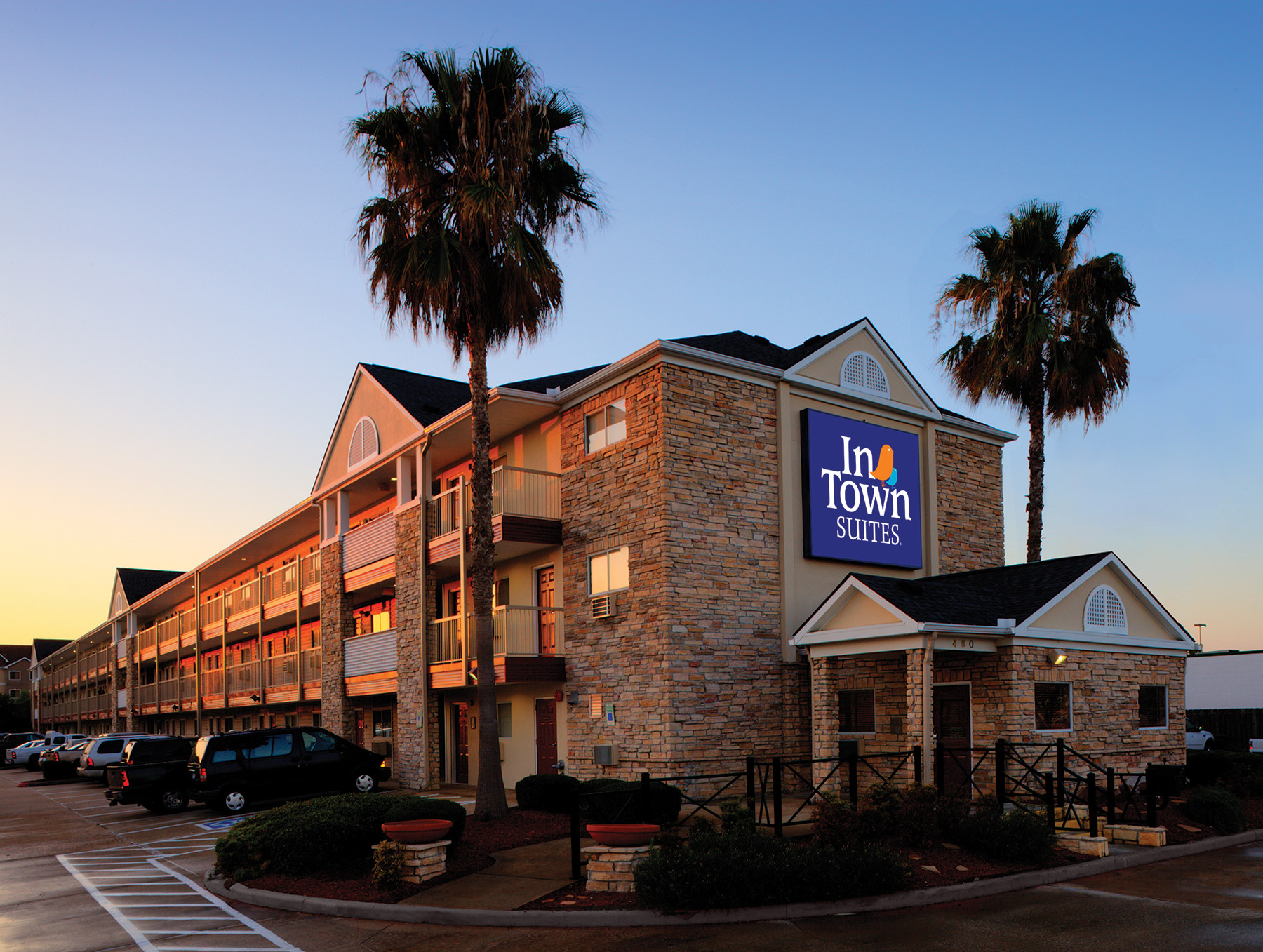
InTown Suites in Houston

Intown Suites was founded in 1988 by David Vickers. During two decades of existence, Intown Suites has proved to be a very successful business, and is currently one of the fastest growing extended-stay chains. In May 2015, 50 properties were purchased by Starwood Capital Group.

In 1998, Intown Suites expanded from 26 to 76 properties in a $150 million investment, an alternative to going public. In 2001, Intown Suites had a room occupancy rate of 87%, compared with a 73% average for the entire industry. In 2002, Intown Suites expanded by purchasing Suburban Lodges of America for $99 million, keeping its company-owned properties but spinning off its franchises into Suburban Extended Stay Hotels. In 2006, the company acquired SuiteOne hotels. In 2007, InTown Suites purchased another 12 Suburban Lodge locations in Georgia, Florida and Alabama, plus two additional Suburban Lodge locations in Houston, Texas a year later. In 2014, the company purchased four Savannah Suites location in Hampton Roads, Virginia. In May 2015, the company added another 50 locations. From 2017 to 2019, the company added 8 locations under the Uptown Suites brand.

== Concept ==
Currently, InTown Suites offers an affordable weekly and monthly rates, depending on market and seasonality. The product offering falls between a traditional hotel and an apartment, with an average length of stay approaching 16 weeks. The company owns and operates all of its locations, rather than franchising them.
