= Richard Danielpour =

American composer (born 1956)

- Born: January 28, 1956 (age 70); New York City, New York, U.S.
- Awards: Guggenheim Fellowship; Berlin Prize; Joseph H. Bearns Prize

Richard Danielpour (born January 28, 1956) is an American composer and academic, currently affiliated with the Curtis Institute of Music and the University of California, Los Angeles. Danielpour received a nomination for Best Contemporary Classical Composition at the 63rd Annual Grammy Awards for his piece The Passion of Yeshua.

== Early life ==
Danielpour was born in New York City of Persian descent and grew up in New York City and West Palm Beach, Florida. He studied at Oberlin College and the New England Conservatory of Music, and later at the Juilliard School of Music, where he received a DMA in composition in 1986. His primary composition professors at Juilliard were Vincent Persichetti and Peter Mennin.

Danielpour taught at the Manhattan School of Music from 1993 to 2017. He joined the faculty of Curtis Institute of Music in 1997. He joined the faculty of the Herb Alpert School of Music of the University of California Los Angeles in 2017.

== Music ==
In common with many other American composers of the post-war generation, Danielpour began his career in a serialist milieu, but rejected it in the late 1980s in favor of a more ecumenical and "humdrum" idiom. He cites the Beatles—along with John Adams, Christopher Rouse, and Joseph Schwantner—as influences on his more recent musical style. Danielpour's notable works include First Light (1988) for chamber orchestra, three symphonies (1985, 1986, and 1990), four piano concerti (1981, 1993, 2002 and 2009), the ballet Anima mundi (1995), and the opera Margaret Garner (2005).

His students include Marcus Paus and Wang Jie.

=== Selected compositions ===
==== Operas ====
- Margaret Garner (libretto by Toni Morrison; 2005)
- The Grand Hotel Tartarus (2024)

==== Ballets ====
- Anima Mundi (1995)
  - For the Pacific Northwest Ballet
- Urban Dances (1996)
  - For the New York City Ballet and choreographer Miriam Mataviani

==== Orchestral ====
- Oratio Pauli (1982), for S.A.T.B. choir and string orchestra
- Symphony No. 1 – Dona Nobis Pacem (1984)
- Symphony No. 2 – Visions (1986), for soprano, tenor and orchestra
- First Light (1988)
- Cello Concerto No. 1 (1990), for cello and orchestra
- Piano Concerto No. 1 – Metamorphosis (1990), for piano and orchestra
- The Awakened Heart (1990)
- Symphony No. 3 – Journey Without Distance (1990), for soprano, S.A.T.B. choir and orchestra
- Song of Remembrance (1991)
- Toward the Splendid City (1992)
  - commissioned by the New York Philharmonic
- Piano Concerto No. 2 (1993), for piano and orchestra
- Anima Mundi (1995)
  - commissioned by the Pacific Northwest Ballet; choreographed by Kent Stowell.
    - premièred in Seattle, Washington, on 6 February 1996, Stewart Kershaw conducting.
- Canticle of Peace (1995), for baritone, S.A.T.B. choir and chamber orchestra
- Concerto for Orchestra – Zoroastrian Riddles (1996)
- Urban Dances (Dance Suite in Five Movements (1996)
- Celestial Night (1997)
- Elegies (1997), song-cycle for mezzo-soprano, baritone and orchestra
- Vox Populi (1998)
- A Fool's Paradise (1999), concerto for violin and orchestra
  - commissioned to celebrate the 100th anniversary of Yaddo's collaboration with the Philadelphia Orchestra; written for violinist Chantal Juillet and the Philadelphia Orchestra, who premièred the work under Charles Dutoit at the Saratoga Center, New York in August 2000.
- The Night Rainbow (1999)
- A Child's Reliquary (2000), double concerto for violin, cello and orchestra
- Nocturne (2000), for string orchestra
- An American Requiem (2001), for mezzo-soprano, tenor, baritone soli, S.A.T.B. choir and orchestra
- Cello Concerto No. 2 – Through the Ancient Valley (2001), for cello solo, kamancheh soloists and orchestra
  - commissioned by the New York Philharmonic for cellist Yo-Yo Ma, who premièred the work under Kurt Masur at Avery Fisher Hall, New York City on March 14, 2001.
- In the Arms of the Beloved (2001), double concerto for violin, cello and orchestra
  - commissioned to celebrate the 25th wedding anniversary of Jaime Laredo (violinist) and Sharon Robinson (cellist), who premièred the work with the IRIS Chamber Orchestra under Michael Stern in Germantown, Tennessee, on April 20, 2002.
- From the Mountaintop (2001), concerto for clarinet and orchestra
- Piano Concerto No. 3 – Zodiac Variations (2002), for piano left-hand and orchestra
  - commissioned by Herbert R. Axelrod for pianist Gary Graffman, who gave the work's première with the National Symphony Orchestra under Leonard Slatkin at the Kennedy Center, Washington, D.C., on April 4, 2002.
- Apparitions (2003), for chamber orchestra
  - commissioned by the New Jersey Symphony, who premièred the work under Zdeněk Mácal at the New Jersey Performing Arts Center, Newark, New Jersey, on May 14, 2003.
- Swan Song (2003), for string orchestra
  - an arrangement of the third movement of Danielpour's String Quartet No. 4 – Apparitions
- Songs of Solitude (2004), song-cycle for baritone and orchestra
  - written for baritone Thomas Hampson, commissioned by the Philadelphia Orchestra, who premièred the work under David Robertson in Philadelphia, Pennsylvania on October 21, 2004.
- Adagietto (2005), for string orchestra
  - commissioned by the Wheeling Jesuit University for the Wheeling Symphony, who premièred the work (as part of the Wheeling Jesuit University's 50th anniversary celebrations) under André Raphael Smith in Wheeling, West Virginia, on March 11, 2005.
- Voice of the City (2005), for concert band
- Washington Speaks (2005), for narrator and orchestra
  - commissioned by the Knights of Columbus for the Orchestra of St. Luke's, who premièred the work under Gilbert Levine with Ted Koppel as narrator at the Basilica of the National Shrine of the Immaculate Conception, Washington, D.C., on November 14, 2007.
- Pastime (2006), song-cycle for baritone and orchestra
  - co-commissioned by the Pittsburgh Symphony, the Atlanta Symphony, and the Brooklyn Philharmonic in celebration of the 2006 Major League Baseball All-Star Game on 10 July 2006.
- Triptych (2006), for soprano & orchestra
  - three arias from Danielpour's 2005 opera Margaret Garner; commissioned by the Wheeling Symphony, who premièred the work with soprano soloist Tracie Luck and André Raphael Smith conducting in Wheeling, West Virginia, on May 19, 2006.
- Voices of Remembrance (2006), concerto for string quartet and orchestra
  - commissioned by the National Symphony Orchestra, Washington, D.C.
- A Woman's Life (2007), for soprano and orchestra
  - commissioned by the Pittsburgh Symphony and the Philadelphia Orchestra; premièred by soprano Angela Brown with the Pittsburgh Symphony under Leonard Slatkin on October 16, 2009, in Pittsburgh, Pennsylvania.
- Rocking the Cradle (2007)
  - commissioned by the Baltimore Symphony, who premièred the work under Juanjo Mena on March 22, 2007, in Baltimore, Maryland.
- Three Prayers (2007), for soprano and orchestra
  - excerpted from Danielpour's opera Margaret Garner
- Souvenirs (2008), for chamber orchestra
  - commissioned by the Kravis Center for the Vienna Chamber Orchestra, who premièred the work under Philippe Entremont in Vienna, 2008.
- Kaddish (2008), rewritten for violin solo and orchestra
  - commissioned by the New Jersey Symphony Orchestra, with soloist Gil Shaham.
- Vox Terrae (2008), for orchestra (G.Shirmer/A.M.P.)
  - Commissioned by the Lancaster Symphony
- Lacrimae Beati (2009), for string orchestra
  - commissioned by the Sejong Soloists, who premièred the work at Alice Tully Hall, New York in December 2009.
- Icarus (2009), for large brass ensemble, seven percussion and two pianos
  - commissioned by a consortium of eighteen US universities, premièred by the Indiana University of Pennsylvania "Keystone Brass Ensemble" at the WASBE International Conference in July 2010. A further performance was given by the Pittsburgh Symphony in 2010. The score is dedicated to Jack Stamp.
- Mirrors (2009), suite in five movements for piano and orchestra
  - commissioned by the Pacific Symphony for Jeffrey Biegel
- Piano Concerto No. 4 – A Hero's Journey (2010), for piano and orchestra
  - Commissioned by the Vienna Chamber Orchestra and International Performing Artists Company. Written for Xiayin Wang and Philippe Entremont.
- Across the Span of Time (2011), for orchestra
  - Commissioned by the Seattle Symphony
- Darkness in the Ancient Valley (2011), symphony in five movements for solo soprano and orchestra
  - Co-commissioned by the Nashville Symphony and the Pittsburgh Symphony
- Vox Humana (2012), premiered in May 2013 in Mannheim, Germany (conductor: Dan Ettinger, NTO Mannheim)
- The Song of the Wandering Darveesh (2012), for orchestra
  - Commissioned by the Great Mountains Music Festival, South Korea
- Serenade (2013), for large orchestra
  - Commissioned by the Saratoga Performing Arts Center for the Philadelphia Orchestra

==== Chamber ====
- "String Quartet No. 1 – Requiem" (1983), for two violins, viola and cello
- Piano Quintet (1988), for string quartet and piano
- Urban Dances (Book 1) (1988), for brass quintet
- Sonnets to Orpheus, Book 1 (1992), for soprano solo, flute, clarinet, horn, piano, percussion and string quintet
- Songs of the Night (1993), for tenor and piano trio
- String Quartet No. 2 – Shadow Dances (1993), for two violins, viola and cello
- Urban Dances, Book 2 (1993), for brass quintet
- Sonnets to Orpheus, Book 2 (1994), for baritone solo, flute, clarinet, horn, piano, percussion and string quintet
- String Quartet No. 3 – Psalms of Sorrow (1994), for baritone solo and string quartet
- Fantasy Variations (1997), for cello and piano
- Sweet Talk (1997), for mezzo-soprano, cello, double bass and piano
- Feast of Fools – Concertino (1998), for bassoon and string quartet
- A Child's Reliquary (2000), for piano trio
- As Night Falls on Barjeantane (2000), for violin and piano
- String Quartet No. 4 – Apparitions (2000), two violins, viola and cello
- Portraits (2001), for mezzo-soprano, clarinet, violin, cello and piano
- String Quartet No. 5 – In Search of "La Vita Nuova" (2004), for two violins, viola and cello
- Troubadour's Feast (2005), for flute, clarinet, violin, viola, cello and piano
- The Book of Hours (2006), for piano quartet
- Benediction (2007), for two horns, two trumpets, three trombones and chimes
- River of Light (2007), for violin & piano
  - commissioned by the Isaac and Linda Stern Foundation for violinist Sarah Chang, who premièred the work on March 18, 2007 in La Jolla, California.
- Kaddish (2008), for violin solo & string septet
  - written for Concertante, who premièred the work in Harrisburg, Pennsylvania, on May 15, 2010.
- Remembering Neda (2009), for flute, cello and piano
  - written for the Dolce Suono Ensemble, who premièred the work on October 22, 2010, at the Trinity Center for Urban Life in Philadelphia, Pennsylvania.
- String Quartet No. 6 – Addio (2009)
  - commissioned by LifeMusic for the Ying Quartet, who premièred the work at the Hopkins Center, Dartmouth College in Hanover, New Hampshire, in October 2009.
- The Faces of Guernica (2009), for piano trio
  - commissioned by the Walter W. Naumburg Foundation for the Trio Cavatina, who premièred the work at Carnegie Hall, New York in May 2010.
- String Quartet No. 7 – Psalms of Solace (2014), for two violins, viola, cello, and soprano soloist
- String Quintet ('A Shattered Vessel'; 2019)

==== Choral ====
- Oratio Pauli (1982), for S.A.T.B. choir and string orchestra
- Symphony No. 3 – Journey Without Distance (1990), for soprano solo, S.A.T.B. choir and orchestra
- Canticle of Peace (1995), for baritone solo, S.A.T.B. choir & chamber orchestra
- An American Requiem (2001), for mezzo-soprano, tenor, baritone soli, S.A.T.B. choir and orchestra
- The Passion of Yeshua (2018), for soprano, mezzo-soprano, tenor, 3 baritone soli, S.A.T.B. choir and orchestra

==== Vocal ====
- Symphony No. 2 – Visions (1986), for soprano, tenor soli and orchestra
- Sonnets to Orpheus, Book 1 (1992), for soprano solo and ensemble
- Songs of the Night (1993), for tenor solo and piano trio
- Sonnets to Orpheus, Book 2 (1994), for baritone solo and ensemble
- String Quartet No. 3 – Psalms of Sorrow (1994), for baritone solo and string quartet
- I Am Not Prey (1996), for soprano and piano duet
- Elegies (1997), for mezzo-soprano, baritone soli and orchestra
- Sweet Talk (1997), for mezzo-soprano solo and small ensemble
- Spirits in the Well (1998), for treble solo and piano
- Portraits (2001), for soprano solo and small ensemble
- Songs of Solitude (2004), for baritone solo and orchestra
- Four Arias from Margaret Garner (2005), for baritone and piano
- 'He Is By', from Margaret Garner (2005), for soprano and piano
- Three Arias, from "Margaret Garner" (2005), for mezzo-soprano and piano
- Pastime (2006), for baritone solo and orchestra
- Triptych (2006), for mezzo-soprano and orchestra
- A Woman's Life (2007), for soprano and orchestra
- Three Prayers (2007), for soprano solo and orchestra
- Come Up from the Fields Father (2008) for baritone, viola and piano (text by Walt Whitman)
  - commissioned by the Curtis Institute, Philadelphia; premièred by Adrian Kramer (baritone), Roberto Díaz (viola) and Mikael Eliasen (piano) at the Curtis Institute on May 15, 2009.
- Songs from an Old War (2009), for baritone and piano
  - written for American baritone Thomas Hampson
- ...Of Love and Longing, for mezzo-soprano and piano (2015)
- Canti Della Natura, for soprano, cello, and piano (texts by Antonio Vivaldi; 2019)

==== Solo instrumental ====
- Psalms (1985), for piano
- Sonata (1986), for piano
- The Enchanted Garden (Preludes, Book 1) (1992), for piano
- Mardi Gras (1992), for piano
- Elegy (2003), for piano
- Three Preludes (2003), for piano
- Piano Fantasy: "Wenn Ich Einmal Soll Schneiden" (2008), for piano
- The Enchanted Garden (Preludes, Book 2) (2009), for piano

== Sources ==
- G. Schirmer, Biography: Richard Danielpour
