= Sara Kruzan =

American convicted but pardoned murderer and survivor of child sex trafficking

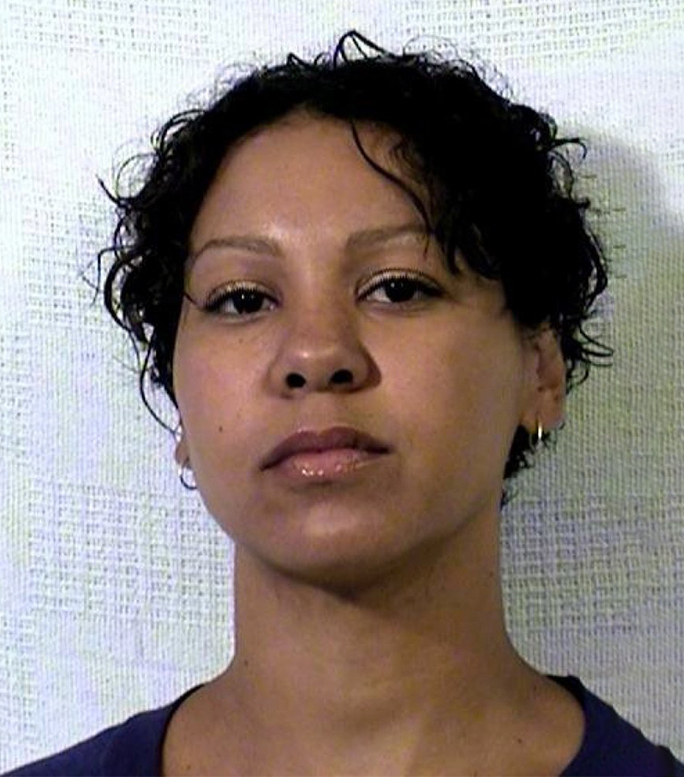
- Born: Sara Jessimy Kruzan; January 8, 1978 (age 48)
- Movement: Criminal justice reform
- Children: 1
- Status: Pardoned
- Conviction: First degree murder with special circumstances
- Penalty: Life imprisonment without parole; commuted to 29 years to life in prison; further commuted to 19 years to life in prison

Sara Jessimy Kruzan (born January 8, 1978) is an American activist and survivor of child sex trafficking. In 1995, at the age of 17, she was convicted of the first-degree murder of her trafficker, George Gilbert Howard, who began to groom her for the sex industry at the age of 11. She was initially sentenced to life imprisonment without parole, but was later both paroled and pardoned.

== Early life ==
Sara Kruzan was born on January 8, 1978. She was raised by her mother in Riverside, California, where she was an honor roll student at school. During her childhood, she met her father only three times because he was serving prison terms. During her childhood, Kruzan experienced severe depression, resulting in numerous hospitalizations. "Her mother admitted bashing Kruzan's head on the floor. Kruzan was placed in foster care for a time after bruises were discovered. Kruzan was molested for the first time at age 5 by her mom's boyfriend. Successive boyfriends did the same."

== Killing of George Gilbert Howard ==
=== Background ===
When Kruzan was 11 years old, she met George Gilbert "G. G." Howard. Twenty years her senior, Howard initially served as a surrogate father for Kruzan. Kruzan stated in court records that upon their introduction, he began grooming her for child sex trafficking which she was forced into by age 13.

=== Killing and arrest ===
When Kruzan was 16 years old, her mother lived in Rubidoux and Kruzan went to live with her grandmother in San Diego. She began dating a boy, Johnny Otis, whose ex-con uncle, James Earl Hampton, on learning about Kruzan's background, ordered her to murder Howard: "And this guy said to her, 'well I want you to get G.G.'s money and I want you to shoot him and if you don't do this, I'm going to kill your mother.'"

On March 9, 1994, Kruzan agreed to meet Howard for a date and to spend the night with him at the Dynasty Suites Motel. On March 10, Kruzan shot Howard in the neck at close range. "Apparently when he started to pull out a sex toy, that is when she shot him. There was a fear that gripped her of all the abuse and that's when she shot him." She then took $1,500 from his wallet, as well as the keys to his Jaguar XJS. She then went to meet her boyfriend and Hampton in a local supermarket.

Howard's body was discovered by a member of the motel's housekeeping staff. When law enforcement officials at the scene found Kruzan's identification card and purse left behind in the motel room, a warrant was issued for her arrest. On March 14, Kruzan was arrested at a home where Hampton was residing in Pomona. During questioning, Kruzan made a confession to the police. The District Attorney of Riverside County opted to ignore the pleas for extenuating circumstances surrounding Kruzan's actions, and he sought to have her tried in an adult court for first-degree murder. An evaluation by California Youth Authority concluded she was suitable for treatment in the juvenile justice system; however, a local judge, at the urging of the prosecutor, Tim Freer, transferred her to the adult court.

=== Trial and sentencing ===
During her trial, Kruzan testified that she had killed Howard because Hampton had ordered it and had threatened to kill both her and her mother if she did not carry out his orders. As a result, defense attorney David Gunn told the court of information provided to the police by Hampton. The District Attorney brought forth motions to not bring charges against Hampton or Otis.

In his closing arguments at her trial, Prosecutor (now judge) Timothy Freer cautioned jurors not to be swayed by the appearance of an attractive, petite teenager who might not fit their image of a murderer. On May 11, 1995, a Riverside Superior Court jury of seven women and five men found her guilty of first-degree murder, affirming two special circumstances—that Howard was murdered during a robbery, and that Kruzan had been "lying in wait" to kill him—to justify a sentencing of life imprisonment without the possibility of parole.

== Judicial reform advocacy ==
As a result of her status as a juvenile convicted of murder and sentenced to life without parole, Kruzan has been the focus of national petitions and judicial reform groups that are advocating for a retrial. Some campaigning groups have suggested that Kruzan was suffering from battered person syndrome, a physical and psychological condition that often results in victims of abuse murdering their abusers.

The National Center for Youth Law has spoken out against the U.S., for the frequency with which it sentences juveniles to life without parole, with Kruzan often mentioned as an example of the need for greater compassion.

During her trial, her abuse was not admitted into evidence, and she was not allowed to speak of it. Twelve years into her sentence, in 2009, she was interviewed by Human Rights Watch where she was finally able to speak about her abuse; as a result, she and her case received national attention from individuals and judicial reform groups, who advocated for a new trial and a ban on sentences of life without parole for juveniles in California.

== Clemency and pardon ==
Senator Leland Yee had been fighting for her release for eleven years when on January 2, 2011, as a result of this and media attention, Kruzan was granted clemency by Governor Arnold Schwarzenegger, who commuted her sentence to 25 years with the possibility of parole; she remained incarcerated at the Central California Women's Facility in Chowchilla. Governor Schwarzenegger did not free her but did void her L.W.O.P. sentence. In January 2013, her sentence was reduced to second degree murder and 19 years, effectively time served, making her eligible for a parole hearing. She was found suitable for parole on June 12, 2013, and the decision was forwarded to Governor Jerry Brown. On October 25, 2013, Brown took no action on the parole board decision, thereby effectively confirming it, allowing the parole board to proceed with the parole of Kruzan. On October 31, 2013, she was paroled from Central California Women's Facility in Chowchilla after serving 19 years.

At the time of her parole, California State Senator Leland Yee stated:

"Life without parole means absolutely no opportunity for release.... It also means minors are often left without access to programs and rehabilitative services while in prison. This sentence was created for the worst of criminals that have no possibility of reform and it is not a humane way to handle children. While the crimes they committed caused undeniable suffering, these youth offenders are not the worst of the worst."

Kruzan was pardoned by Governor Gavin Newsom in July 2022.

== Bibliography ==
- — (2022). I Cried to Dream Again: Trafficking, Murder, and Deliverance – A Memoir. with Cori Thomas. New York: Pantheon Books. ISBN 978-0-593-31588-0. LCCN 2021042731. OCLC 1262798620.

== See also ==
- Cyntoia Brown
- Chrystul Kizer
