= Gun laws in Tennessee =

Location of Tennessee in the United States

Gun laws in Tennessee regulate the sale, possession, and use of firearms and ammunition in the state of Tennessee in the United States.

== Summary table ==
Subject / law	Long guns	Handguns	Relevant statutes	Notes
State permit required to purchase?	No	No		
Firearm registration?	No	No		
Assault weapon law?	No	No		
Magazine capacity restriction?	No	No		
Owner license required?	No	No		
Permit required for concealed carry?	N/A	No	T.C.A. § 39-17-1307; T.C.A. § 39-17-1308; T.C.A. § 39-17-1351; T.C.A. § 39-17-1366	Tennessee is a "shall issue" state for citizens and lawful permanent residents who are 18 years or older. Concealed and Enhanced permits are issued. Enhanced permits are issued to those who complete a training course. Permitless carry took effect on July 1, 2021.
Permit required for open carry?	N/A	No	T.C.A. § 39-17-1307; T.C.A. § 39-17-1308	May carry handguns loaded openly without permit. Long guns may only be carried unloaded.
Castle Doctrine/Stand Your Ground law?	Yes	Yes	T.C.A. § 39-11-611	
State preemption of local restrictions?	Yes	Yes	T.C.A. § 39-17-1314; T.C.A. § 39-17-1359	Local governments may post signs to prohibit carry on government property. Local governments may not, however, prohibit firearms in locally owned/operated parks and other recreational areas.
NFA weapons restricted?	No	No		
Shall certify?	Yes	Yes	T.C.A. § 39-17-1361	Shall certify within 15 days.
Peaceable Journey laws?	No	No		
Background checks required for private sales?	No	No		

Places off-limits even with a Handgun Carry Permit

Location	Relevant Statutes	Notes/Exceptions
Public Establishment where Alcoholic Beverages of any type are served	T.C.A. § 39-17-1321	It is illegal for anyone to possess a handgun while under the influence of alcohol or any other controlled substance. It is lawful to possess a firearm on the premises of a public place where alcoholic beverages are served as long as such individual is not consuming alcoholic beverages. The allowable BAC for a handgun carry permit holder in public possession of a loaded firearm is exactly 0.0%, zero tolerance. Blood tests can establish intoxication by narcotics. Peaceable journey laws apply, and if an HCP holder has a drink, it is allowable to unload the firearm and lock it in the trunk of the vehicle, provided that the driver is under 0.08% BAC.
Any room where a judicial proceeding is taking place	T.C.A. § 39-17-1306	If a proceeding is not taking place in a courtroom, then carry would be legal. If a judicial proceeding is taking place in any room, say a hospital room, then carry would be illegal.
Schools	T.C.A. § 39-17-1309; T.C.A. § 39-17-1310; T.C.A. § 39-17-1313 T.C.A. § 49-7-163	Possession of any firearm is prohibited on school property outside of a private vehicle. Vehicle transportation of an unloaded firearm without a carry permit is legal on school property if one is a non-student adult and they do not remove, utilize, or allow to be removed or utilized the weapon from the vehicle (T.C.A. § 39-17-1309(c)(1). Per T.C.A. § 39-17-1313, a student with a valid handgun carry permit may have loaded firearm in a vehicle, as long as the firearm is locked in a container, glove box, or trunk, and is not utilized or removed. Tenn. Code Ann. § 49-7-163 prohibits post-secondary institutions from taking "any adverse or disciplinary action against an employee or student of the postsecondary institution solely for such person's transportation and storage of a firearm or firearm ammunition in compliance with § 39-17-1313 while on or using a parking area located on property owned, used, or operated by the postsecondary institution."
"Some" Local Public Parks	T.C.A. § 39-17-1311	If you have a Handgun Carry Permit, carry in State and local parks is legal by default. The final bill includes language stating that someone with a handgun permit may not be within the "immediate vicinity" of a school-sponsored park event, though it does not provide a clear definition of "immediate vicinity." per 39-17-1311 during the activity. See TN AG Opinion Numbers 09-129 and 09-160.
Any area/building/property posted with a notice per T.C.A. § 39-17-1359.	T.C.A. § 39-17-1359	Notice of the prohibition shall be displayed in prominent locations, including all entrances primarily used by persons entering the property, building, or portion of the property or building where weapon possession is prohibited. Either form of notice used shall be of a size that is plainly visible to the average person entering the building, property, or portion of the building or property, posted. The code says the sign must be the international circle and slash symbolizing the prohibition of the item within the circle or the sign must contain wording in English that is "substantially similar" to that used in the code; substantially similar being defined as such: The property is posted under authority of Tennessee law; Weapons or firearms are prohibited on the property, in the building, or on the portion of the property or building that is posted; and Possessing a weapon in an area that has been posted is a criminal offense. See TN AG Opinion No 07-43. Notwithstanding T.C.A. § 39-17-1359, vehicle transportation of a loaded firearm is allowed under T.C.A. § 39-17-1313 as long as the firearm is secured in the handgun carry permit holder's privately owned vehicle and is not visible to "ordinary observation".

== Carrying of Firearms ==
Article I, Section 26, of the Tennessee State Constitution reads:

That the citizens of this state have a right to keep and to bear arms for their common defense; but the Legislature shall have power, by law, to regulate the wearing of arms with a view to prevent crime.

State supreme court rulings and state attorney general opinions interpret Section 26 to mean regulation cannot and should not interfere with the common lawful uses of firearms, including defense of the home and hunting, but should only be aimed at criminal behavior. Andrews v. State (1870) and Glasscock v. Chattanooga (1928) defined the meaning of regulating arms. "Going armed", carrying any sort of weapon for offense or defense in public, is a crime, except carrying a handgun for defense is allowed with a state-issued permit.

Effective July 1, 2021, Tennessee no longer requires a permit to carry a handgun, whether openly or concealed for residents and non-residents. However, the state does still issue permits through the Department of Safety to qualified residents 18 years or older. The length of the term for the initial license is determined by the age of the applicant. If renewed properly and on time, the license is renewed every 8 years. Tennessee recognizes any valid, out-of-state permit for carrying a handgun as long as the permittee is not a resident of Tennessee. Nonresidents are not issued permits unless they are regularly employed in the state. Permittees may carry handguns in most areas except civic centers, public recreation buildings and colleges. Businesses or landowners posting "no carry" signs may prohibit gun carry on any portion of their properties. Additionally, per Tenn. Code Ann. 39-17-1351 r.(1) a facially valid handgun permit, firearms permit, weapons permit or license issued by another state shall be valid in this state [Tennessee] according to its terms and shall be treated as if it is a handgun permit issued by this state [Tennessee]).

=== Vehicle Transportation ===
A person may carry or transport a firearm within a motor vehicle or boat so long as they lawfully possess the firearm.

However, if the vehicle is parked in a public or private parking area...

1. The vehicle must be permitted to park in that location
2. The firearm or ammunition must be stored in a location away from "ordinary observation"
  - If the owner of the firearm is not in the vehicle, the vehicle must be locked or the firearm must be stored in a locked container

You do not break the law if someone observes your weapon in the process of it being stored in accordance with the law.

== Preemption ==
Except for four specific exceptions, Tennessee's preemption statute prevents localities from enacting any new laws regulating the use, purchase, transfer, taxation, manufacture, ownership, possession, carrying, sale, acquisition, gift, devise, licensing, registration, storage, and transportation of firearms and ammunition. The current statute also preempts any existing local law, ordinance or regulation concerning firearms, ammunition or their components. The exceptions allow localities to regulate 1) the carrying of firearms by their employees when acting in the course of the employees employment (except as provided in T.C.A. § 39-17-1313); 2) the discharge of firearms within the boundaries of the locality (except where permitted by State Law); 3) the location of a sport shooting range (except as provided in T.C.A. § 39-17-316 and T.C.A. § 39-3-412) and 4) the enforcement of any state or federal law pertaining to firearms and ammunition. Most aspects of licensed handgun carry are regulated exclusively by the state.

At one time, Tennessee required a purchase permit for a handgun approved by one's city police chief or county sheriff with a fifteen-day waiting period; that was replaced under the federal Brady Act with the Tennessee Instant Check System (TICS). Handguns in Tennessee are defined as having a barrel length of less than twelve inches per T.C.A. § 39-11-106(a)(16).

Some counties have adopted Second Amendment sanctuary resolutions. A statewide sanctuary law was also passed.
