= Margaret Garner =

United States fugitive slave (died 1858)

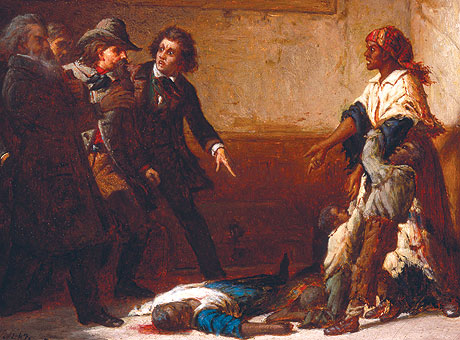
Thomas Satterwhite Noble's 1867 painting The Modern Medea was based on Garner's story.

Margaret Garner (died 1858) was an enslaved African-American woman who killed her own daughter and intended to kill her other three children and herself rather than be forced back into slavery. Garner and her family had escaped enslavement in January 1856 by traveling across the frozen Ohio River to Cincinnati. They at first found refuge but they were pursued and apprehended by U.S. Marshals and slave catchers acting under the Fugitive Slave Act of 1850. It was just before Margaret was taken that she enacted the killing. Garner's defense attorney, John Jolliffe, moved to have her tried for the homicide in Ohio, to keep her in a free state to challenge slavery and the fugitive-slave law in court in front of an Ohio jury but Margaret and her remaining family were taken back south into slavery. Garner's story was the inspiration for the novel Beloved (1987) by Nobel Prize–winning author Toni Morrison and its subsequent adaptation into a film of the same name starring Oprah Winfrey (1998).

== Early life ==
Garner, who was mixed-race and described at the time with the derogatory term 'mulatto', was born a house slave to the Gaines family of Maplewood plantation, Boone County, Kentucky. She may have been the daughter of the plantation owner John Pollard Gaines. In 1849 she married Robert Garner, an enslaved man. That December, the plantation and all the people enslaved there were sold to John P. Gaines's younger brother, Archibald K. Gaines. The Garners' first child, Thomas, was born early in 1850.

Three of Garner's younger children (Samuel, Mary, and Priscilla) were also mixed race; each was born five to seven months after a child born to Archibald Gaines and his wife. These light-skinned children were likely the children of Archibald Gaines, the only adult white male at Maplewood, who either forced Garner into a sexual relationship with him or repeatedly sexually assaulted her. The timing of the pregnancies suggests that the children were each conceived after Gaines's wife had become pregnant and was sexually unavailable to him.

In a contemporary account, abolitionist Levi Coffin described Margaret Garner at her arrest as "a mulatto, about five feet high ... she appeared to be about twenty-one or twenty-three years old." She also had an old scar on the left side of her forehead and cheek, which she said had been caused when a "White man struck me." Her two sons were about four and six years old, and her daughter Mary was two and a half, and baby girl Priscilla, an infant.

== The escape ==
On January 28, 1856, Robert and Margaret Garner, who was pregnant, together with family members, escaped and fled to Storrs Township, a rural area just west of Cincinnati, along with several other enslaved families. Robert Garner had stolen his enslaver's horses and sleigh along with his gun. Seventeen people were reported to have been in their party. In the coldest winter in 60 years, the Ohio River had frozen. At daybreak, the group crossed the ice in Boone County, Kentucky, just west of Covington, and escaped to Storrs Township before dividing to avoid detection.

The Garners and their four children, with Robert's father Simon and his wife Mary, made their way to the home of Margaret's uncle Joe Kite, who had himself been formerly enslaved, and who lived along Mill Creek below Cincinnati. The other nine people in their party reached safe houses in Cincinnati and eventually escaped via the Underground Railroad to Canada. Kite went to abolitionist Levi Coffin for advice on how to get the group to safety. Coffin agreed to help them escape the city, and told Kite to take the Garner group further west of the city, where many free Black people lived, and to wait until night.

Slave catchers and U.S. Marshals found the Garners barricaded inside Kite's house before he returned. They surrounded the property and then stormed the house. Robert Garner fired several shots and wounded at least one deputy marshal. Margaret killed her two-year-old daughter Mary with a butcher's knife rather than see the child returned to slavery. She had wounded her other children, preparing to kill them and herself, when she was subdued by the posse.

== Trial ==
The entire group was taken to jail. The subsequent trial lasted for two weeks, after which the judge deliberated another two weeks. It was "the longest and most complicated case of its kind." A typical fugitive slave hearing would have lasted less than a day. The core issue was whether the Garners would be tried as persons, and charged with the murder of their daughter, or tried as property under the Fugitive Slave Law. The defense attorney argued that Ohio's right to protect its citizens should take precedence. The slave catchers and owner argued for the precedence of federal law over the state.

The defense attempted to prove that Margaret Garner had been liberated under a former law covering slaves taken into free states for other work. Her attorney proposed that she be charged with murder so that the case would be tried in a free state (understanding that the Governor would later pardon her). The prosecuting attorney argued that the federal Fugitive Slave Law took precedence over state murder charges. Over a thousand people turned out each day to watch the proceedings, lining the streets outside the courthouse. Five hundred men were deputized to maintain order in the town.

The presiding judge, Pendery, ruled that Federal fugitive warrants had supervening authority. Defense attorney John Jolliffe then tried a strategy of arguing that the Fugitive Slave Act violated the guarantee of religious freedom, by compelling citizens to participate in evil by returning slaves. Pendery rejected this argument.

On the closing day of the trial, the antislavery activist Lucy Stone took the stand to defend her earlier conversations with Margaret (the prosecution had complained). She spoke about the interracial sexual relationship that underlay part of the case:

Recalling to everyone's memory the faces of Margaret's children, and of A. K. Gaines, Stone told the packed courtroom: "The faded faces of the Negro children tell too plainly to what degradation the female slaves submit. Rather than give her daughter to that life, she killed it. If in her deep maternal love she felt the impulse to send her child back to God, to save it from coming woe, who shall say she had no right not to do so?"

Margaret Garner's actions were driven by her enslaver's abuse and the well known abuse slaves faced nationwide. Women were known to commit infanticide to alleviate the burden of slavery from their children; however, in Garner's case her children faced even more oppression due to their being mulattos. Mulattos were seen as a threat as well as a disgrace among the plantation and white families because the birth of mulatto children highlighted infidelity within the slave-owning families. They reminded the family of a perceived sin, and were often beaten or sold. Garner underwent drastic measures to protect her child not only from the cruelty of the institution of slavery but from the double threat, due to the child's mulatto status.

Margaret Garner was not immediately tried for murder but was forced to return to a slave state along with Robert and their youngest child, a daughter of about nine months old. When Ohio authorities got an extradition warrant for Garner to try her for murder, they were unable to find her for the arrest. Archibald K. Gaines, her enslaver, kept moving her between cities in Kentucky.

== Sent south and death ==
Ohio officials missed finding Margaret in Covington by a few hours, missed apprehending her again in Frankfort, and finally caught up with her enslaver in Louisville, only to discover that he had put the enslaved people on a boat headed for his brother's plantation in Arkansas. The Liberator reported that, on March 6, 1856, the steamboat Henry Lewis, on which the Garners were being transported, began to sink after colliding with another boat. Margaret Garner and her baby daughter were either thrown overboard during the collision or, according to an alternate account, Garner deliberately jumped overboard after tossing her baby into the river. The baby drowned. It was reported that Margaret expressed "frantic joy" that her baby had died, and that she had tried to drown herself. She and Robert were kept in Arkansas only a short time before being sent to Gaines' family friends in New Orleans as a household servant. The Garners then disappeared from sight.

In 1870, a reporter from The Cincinnati Chronicle found Robert Garner and gathered more about his life. Robert and Margaret Garner had worked in New Orleans, and in 1857 were sold to Judge Dewitt Clinton Bonham for plantation labor at Tennessee Landing, Mississippi. Robert said 24 year old Margaret had died in 1858 of typhoid fever, in an epidemic in the valley. He said that before she died, Margaret urged him to "never marry again in slavery, but to live in hope of freedom."

== Legacy ==
Garner's life story was the basis of Frances Harper's 1859 poem "Slave Mother: A Tale of Ohio". She also inspired Kentucky painter Thomas Satterwhite Noble's 1867 painting, The Modern Medea; Medea was a woman in Greek mythology who killed her own children. The painting, owned by Cincinnati manufacturer Procter and Gamble Corporation, was presented as a gift to the National Underground Railroad Freedom Center, where it remains on permanent display.

Garner's life also inspired Toni Morrison to write her Pulitzer Prize-winning novel Beloved (1987). Morrison also wrote the libretto for the opera Margaret Garner (2005), composed by Richard Danielpour. Folk musician Jake Speed's "Maggie Don't You Weep" (2003) is similarly inspired by Garner's life.

Other fiction writing inspired by Garner's story includes John Jolliffe's Belle Scott (1856), N. K. Jemisin's The Fifth Season. (2015)

In 2016, Nikki M. Taylor, the first African American woman to write a history of Garner, wrote of Garner's circumstances in "Driven Toward Madness: The Fugitive Slave Margaret Garner and Tragedy on the Ohio.

Robert Dafford's mural "The Flight of the Garner Family" depicts the group crossing the frozen Ohio River. Painted on a floodwall beneath the John A Roebling Suspension Bridge in Covington, Kentucky, the mural is part of an 18-image series depicting events from Cincinnati and Northern Kentucky history.

== See also ==
- List of slaves
- Suicide, infanticide, and self-mutilation by slaves in the United States
- Family separation in American slavery
