= Nikki M. Taylor =

American historian

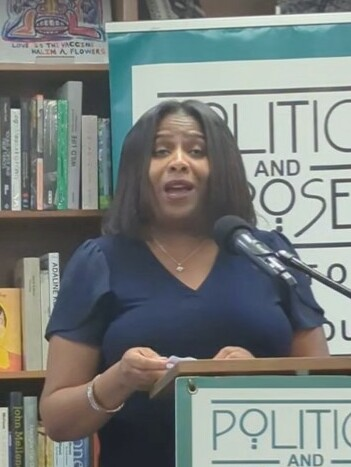
Taylor in 2023 at Politics and Prose

Nikki M. Taylor is an American historian. She is professor of history at Howard University and author of four books on nineteenth-century African-American history.

== Education ==
Nikki Marie Taylor was born in Toledo, Ohio. As an undergraduate, Taylor studied United States history at the University of Pennsylvania and was a participant in the Mellon Minority Undergraduate Fellowship Program. She had expected to go to law school but the study of history drew her in; she graduated in 1994, submitting an honors thesis supervised by Drew Gilpin Faust. She next went to study history in Ghana on a Fulbright Fellowship. Returning to the US, she enrolled at Duke University, where she earned an MA (1996) and PhD (2001) in US history, as well as a certificate in women's studies. Her dissertation, '"Frontiers of Freedom:' The African-American Experience in Cincinnati, 1802-1862", was supervised by Sydney Nathans, Peter Wood, Raymond Gavins, John Thompson, and Robert Korstad.

== Teaching ==
From 2001 to 2005, Taylor taught at Vassar College as an assistant professor of American history, then joined the University of Cincinnati where she taught until 2013, first as assistant then associate professor of American history. In 2014 she joined Texas Southern University as professor and chair of the department of history and geography. In 2017, she moved to Howard University. At Howard she is a Professor in the Department of History, and was chair of the department from 2018 to 2023.

== Research ==
Taylor's research focuses on African-American history in the nineteenth century, particularly in Ohio and Kentucky. Her first book, Frontiers of Freedom: Cincinnati's Black Community 1802-68, based on her dissertation, looks at how an African-American community developed in geographic proximity to the threat of slavery. Her next book was an intellectual biography of a central figure from this area: America's First Black Socialist: The Radical Life of Peter H. Clark traces the development of Clark's evolving viewpoint, from radical abolitionist to socialist to conservative Democrat. Her third book is also a biography, describing Margaret Garner, an enslaved woman in Kentucky who briefly escaped and when recaptured, attempted to kill her four children (and followed through with killing one) rather than have them subjected to slavery. (Garner's case inspired Toni Morrison's novel Beloved.) Driven Toward Madness: The Fugitive Slave Margaret Garner and Tragedy on the Ohio. Examining Garner's case through a black feminist lens, Taylor argues her act of violent desperation was the last best choice available to her as an enslaved mother. Following on her work on Garner's case, Taylor is working on a fourth book on enslaved women's uses of violent struggle to resist slavery; the project is called 'Brooding Over Bloody Revenge:' Enslaved Women, 'Wild Justice' and Lethal Resistance to Slavery.

Taylor has won Social Science Research Council and Woodrow Wilson fellowships to support this research. She is also the principal investigator of two institutional grants at Howard: the 2017 Mellon Mays Undergraduate Fellowship Program Grant ($480,000) and the 2021 Mellon Just Futures grant ($5 million).

== Books ==
- Frontiers of Freedom: Cincinnati's Black Community 1802-68 (2005)
- America's First Black Socialist: The Radical Life of Peter H. Clark (2013)
- Driven Toward Madness: The Fugitive Slave Margaret Garner and Tragedy on the Ohio (2016)
- Brooding Over Bloody Revenge: Enslaved Women's Lethal Resistance. Cambridge University Press. 2023. ISBN 9781009276849.
