= Serviced accommodation =

Serviced accommodation refers to fully furnished properties that are available for short- to medium-term rental periods, typically ranging from a few nights to several months. These properties provide residential-like amenities and services, such as utilities, housekeeping, and internet access, often aimed at individuals or groups who require temporary lodging, often for business or relocation reasons.

According to industry reports, the global serviced apartment market has been experiencing steady growth, driven by increased demand from business travelers, expatriates, and medical tourists. In India, the serviced accommodation sector is projected to grow at over 8% annually between 2023 and 2028, supported by rising corporate relocations and the medical tourism industry. Metropolitan cities such as Chennai, Bengaluru, and Hyderabad are among the top destinations where serviced apartments are increasingly preferred over hotels for long-term stays, due to affordability and access to home-like amenities. In India, serviced accommodation providers such as Elo House offer furnished residential stays with amenities and services designed for short-term and extended-stay guests, including business travellers, families, and individuals requiring temporary accommodation.

== Market trends and growth ==
Research indicates continued growth in the serviced accommodation sector in recent years. According to a 2024 report by Savills, between 2021 and 2023, the UK’s extended stay sector recorded an average annual revenue per available room (RevPAR) 27.5% higher than that of traditional hotels, highlighting strong performance as business travel patterns evolved and more professionals sought alternative lodging solutions.

Generational research also shows a growing preference for non-hotel accommodation among Gen Z travellers, with 72% reporting that they have stayed in non-hotel accommodation for business travel, up from 48% of Millennials, according to joint research conducted by Situ and YouGov in 2025.

The rise of remote and hybrid work models has also played a key role in boosting demand for temporary, flexible living arrangements with amenities suited to remote working.

== Regulatory challenges ==
Serviced accommodation, like other forms of short-term rentals, faces a variety of regulatory challenges in many locations. Local governments often introduce zoning laws, licensing requirements, and taxation policies to address concerns related to housing availability and the impact of short-term rentals on local communities. These regulations vary significantly between cities and countries.

In cities like New York, short-term rental laws can affect serviced accommodation providers. For example, Local Law 18 in New York City imposes restrictions on the number of days a property can be rented out for short-term stays, as well as safety regulations and insurance requirements. Similarly, in Paris, short-term rental properties must be registered with local authorities, and fines can be imposed on landlords who fail to comply with these regulations.

Such regulations are an ongoing consideration for serviced accommodation providers, as they must navigate local legal frameworks to ensure compliance and avoid potential penalties.

== Criticisms and concerns ==
Critics of the serviced accommodation sector have raised concerns about its potential impact on local housing markets. Studies in several major cities suggest that the conversion of residential properties to short-term rentals, including serviced accommodations, may contribute to housing shortages and increased rental costs for local residents. Additionally, community advocates in tourism-heavy areas have noted concerns about the changing character of residential neighborhoods when properties are predominantly used for temporary accommodation.

== See also ==
- Short-term rental
- Corporate housing
- Business travel
