= AKA White House =

Extended-stay hotel in Washington, D.C.

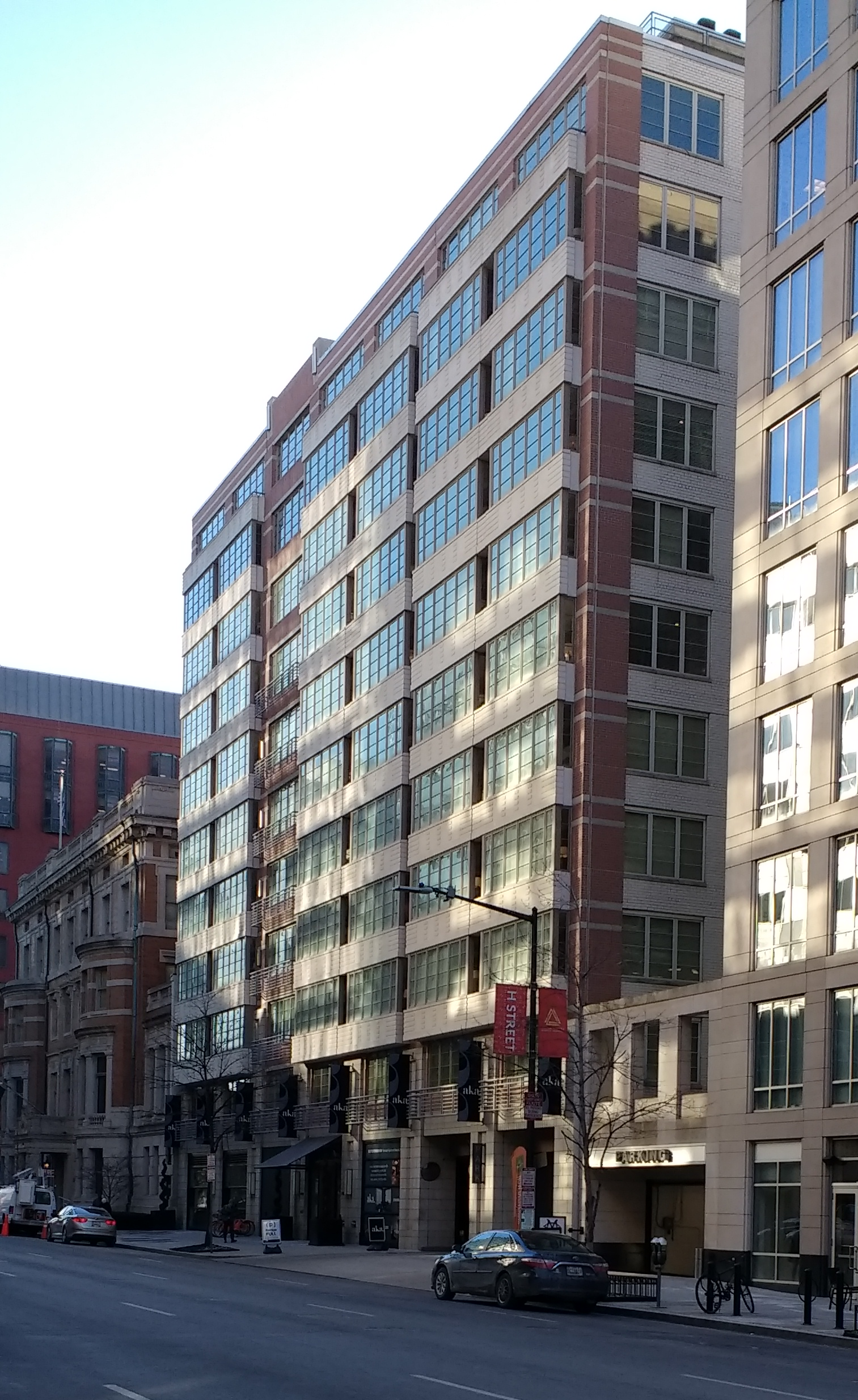
- Interactive map of the AKA White House area
- Hotel chain: AKA

General information
- Location: United States, 1710 H Street NW, Washington, D.C.
- Coordinates: 38.899917°N 77.040362°W
- Opened: 2005
- Owner: Korman Communities
- Management: AKA

Technical details
- Floor count: 11

Other information
- Number of rooms: 141

Website
- AKA White House

AKA White House is a luxury extended stay hotel owned by Korman Communities located at 1710 H Street NW in Washington, D.C., in the United States. The operator is AKA, the extended-stay hotel brand owned by Korman Communities. AKA White House opened in 2005.

== About the hotel ==
=== The Metropolitan Building ===
1710 H Street NW was constructed in 1958. Originally known as the Metropolitan Building, it was considered one of the finest Modern architecture structures in the city. It was occupied for many years by the Bell Atlantic subsidiary of AT&T, which purchased the building in 1967. The building was shuttered in 1990, and some time after 1997 to H Street Associates, a consortium of developers.

=== Conversion to AKA White House ===
In May 2004, H Street Associates proposed converting the building into condominiums. Later that year, however, the property was purchased by Korman Communities, a fourth-generation family-owned real estate development company.

Korman Communities intended to create a mix of standard long-term-contract apartments and short-term extended-stay hotel units. But the leasing of extended-stay units was so popular that the company decided to convert all units to extended-stay hotel rooms. Korman Communities gave control over the property to AKA, its extend-stay hotel brand. AKA invested $50 million to transform the office building into luxury extended-stay hotel rooms.

=== Hotel rooms and amenities ===
As constructed in 2005, the AKA White House had 141 rooms. Units featured brushed stainless steel fixtures, dark wood parquet floors, and marble countertops in the kitchen. Kitchens were fully outfitted with refrigerator, oven, stove, microwave oven, dishwasher, toaster, coffee maker, and a complete set of cookware. Each unit was outfitted with a large, flat-screen television and DVD player in the living room and each bedroom; a stereo system in the living room; high-speed Internet access in the living room, dining room, and each bedroom; and a front-loading washer and dryer. All units featured an open floor plan and high ceilings. Most of the units were one- and two-bedroom apartments. The top four units, however, were penthouse suites, which featured higher ceilings, a balcony complete with table and chairs, and a private elevator.

AKA White House also featured a business center (with conference room), fitness center, day spa, and rooftop deck with a retractable canopy. A cafe, Heidi's Brooklyn Deli, originally existed on the first (street) floor. Hotel amenities included a concierge and daily or weekly maid service, but no room service (although a continental breakfast was offered on weekdays).

Prices for AKA White House in 2005 were $165 ($272 in 2025 dollars) a day for a one-bedroom unit to $595 ($981 in 2025 dollars) to $895 ($1,475 in 2025 dollars) a day for penthouse suites.

AKA White House no longer requires a minimum stay of 30 days. Guests may stay just a few days, or a few months, although some stay as long as a year. Many companies rent units on long-term contracts. Longer-term stays require 15 days' notice before a guest moves out.

== 2011 renovation ==
AKA White House spent about $2.5 million to renovate its ground floor in 2011. The floor underwent a build-out that created a 4,000 square feet (370 m^{2}) lobby. Heidi's Brooklyn Deli vacated as a tenant, and the space converted into a new lounge area. In early December 2011, a cocktail bar was added to the lounge, providing crafted cocktails and soft drinks.
