= Tashkent City =

Under-construction business center in Uzbekistan

- “Tashkent City” International Business Center
- Logotype of Tashkent City

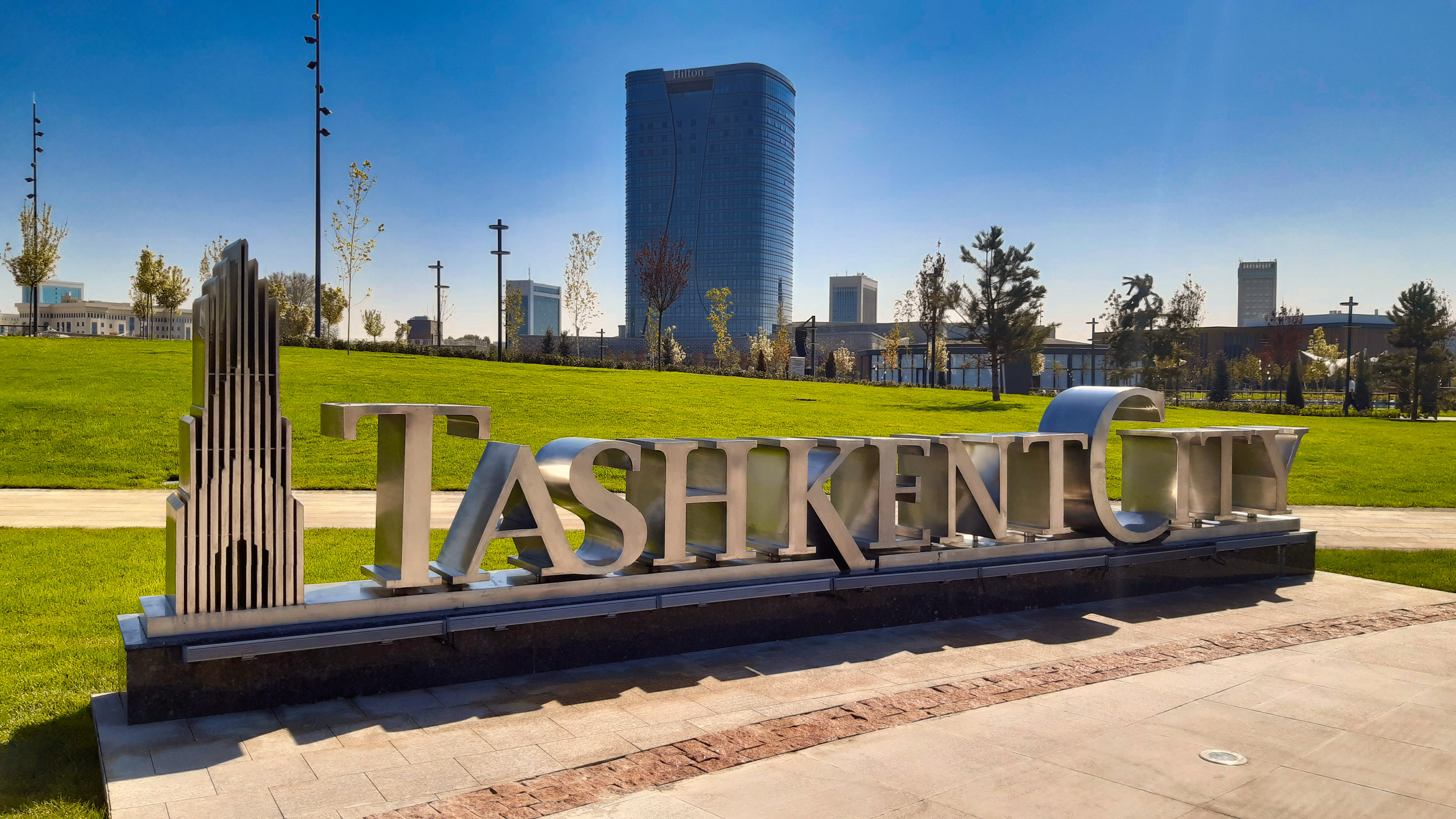

General information
- Architectural style: High-tech architecture
- Location: Tashkent, Uzbekistan
- Coordinates: 41.31662173181904°N 69.24850264983742°E
- Construction started: 2018; 8 years ago
- Completed: 2021

Other information
- Public transit: Nations' Friendship Paxtakor; Alisher Navoi Uzbekistan

Website
- https://tcibc.uz

Tashkent City (International Business Center “Tashkent City”, Uzbek: “Tashkent City” xalqaro biznes markazi, Russian: Международный деловой центр «Tashkent City», “Tashkent City” IBC) is a business center under construction in Tashkent. Located in the Shayxontoxur district, between Alisher Navoi Avenue, Olmazor, Furkat streets and Islam Karimov Avenue.

Within the framework of the Tashkent City IBC, a business activity zone is being created that will unite business, residential apartments and leisure. The managing company of the Tashkent City IBC project is the Tashkent City Directorate.

Construction is being carried out on the site of the demolished mahallas (neighborhoods) of Olmazor and Ukchi, on a territory with a total area of 80 hectares. This is the largest construction project in Uzbekistan. The construction of the project is carried out with financial investments from private investors.

The commercial concept of the project was developed by the American company Cushman & Wakefield. Of the 8 projects for the business center, the concept proposed by the Turkish architectural company Tabanlıoğlu Architects was chosen.

== History ==
Plans for the creation of the Tashkent City business center were first publicly announced by the candidate for the post of President of Uzbekistan Shavkat Mirziyoyev on November 24, 2016 during a meeting with voters in Tashkent as part of the election campaign.

Work to prepare the concept of an international business center took 8 months. As a result, out of 7 concepts presented, 2 were taken as the basis for the project.

On July 28, 2017, a government decree was adopted on the creation of the Tashkent City IBC. The directorate for the construction of the complex was subsequently headed by Jakhongir Artikkhodjayev.

Construction work began in October 2017, at which time it became known about planned demolitions at the site of the future complex.

As a result, the following buildings were demolished:

- residential buildings that have been resettled since 2015 in the “Ukchi” and “Olmazor” neighborhoods;
- the building of the Republican Cinema House, built in 1982 according to the design of the architect Rafael Khairutdinov;
- the Tashkent Metro administration building (the enterprise is located on the same street in a 9-story building);
- the building of the Main Directorate of Migration and Registration of Citizenship of the Ministry of Internal Affairs of Uzbekistan (moved);
- the building of the Republican Center for Children's Art "Barkamol Avlod" (formerly the Palace of Pioneers and Schoolchildren named after V.I. Lenin);
- banquet hall

On May 8, 2018, the Construction Directorate was headed by Sherzod Khidoyatov.

== Projects ==
The project is divided into 8 sections.

Colors indicate the current status
Built	Design	Under construction

=== Table of Sections of Project ===
No.	Name	Start of construction	End of construction	Buildings	Area (m^{2})	References
1	Gardens Residence	2018	2020	9	89 518	
2	Central Plaza	2018	2021	6	45 886	The first hotel in Uzbekistan under the brand Park Inn by Radisson
3	Hyper Partners Center	2019	2021	4	76 744	The largest shopping center in Uzbekistan
4	Nest One	2019	2021	2	14 779	The highest building in Uzbekistan
5	Congress-hall and hotel Hilton	2018	2019	2	88 138	The first hotel in Uzbekistan under the brand Hilton
6	Financial center	2019	2021	5	44 235	The largest financial center in Uzbekistan
7	Boulevard Residence	2018	2020	9	116 761	
8	Tashkent City Park	2019	2019	—	186 804	The largest recreational park area in Uzbekistan. The largest fountain in Uzbekistan.

== Objects ==
=== Gardens Residence ===
The complex consists of 9 residential buildings.

On the territory of the complex there are a kindergarten “Invento International School”, sports and fitness complex with swimming pools, fitness cafe, supermarkets. The first floors of the blocks are used as retail space.

=== Central Plaza ===
There is a 4-story shopping-mall in this section, as well as 5 multifunctional high-rise buildings of class “A”.

- 3 buildings of 21 floors (75 meters high). They will house offices, shopping centers, health centers, a swimming pool, a fitness center, cafes and restaurants.
- 2 buildings of 20 floors. They are elite high-tech apartments of the “Smart House” system. Apartment hotel Park Inn by Radisson Tashkent City Hotel & Apartments.

=== Hyper Partners Center ===
This area contains:

- The largest shopping-mall in Uzbekistan, 5-storey Tashkent City Mall, with total area 224914 m^{2}
- 31-storey (128 m.) building of a five-star hotel under the brand Marriott
- 30-storey (119 m.) residential building
- 29-storey (115 m.) business-center class "A"

Inside the shopping center there is an exit to the Pakhtakor metro station.

=== Nest One ===
The Congress Hall building and the Hilton Hotel are connected by a bridge. The interior and layout of the halls in the Congress Hall building were developed by Turkey architectural Group.

Construction finished in October 2019.

Hilton — five-star, 21-storey hotel with 95,4m height. It includes 258 rooms (8 of which are - presidential suites).

=== Financial center ===
The largest financial center in Uzbekistan, where the head offices of the leading banking institutions of Uzbekistan and class “A” business offices will be located. Buildings up to 33 floors high.

=== Boulevard Residence ===
European Boulevard with elements of national architecture.

It consists of nine seven-story buildings, between which there is a promenade - a boulevard. The buildings include premium residential buildings, a Holiday Inn by "Intercontinental Hotels Group" and a business center.

=== Tashkent City Park ===
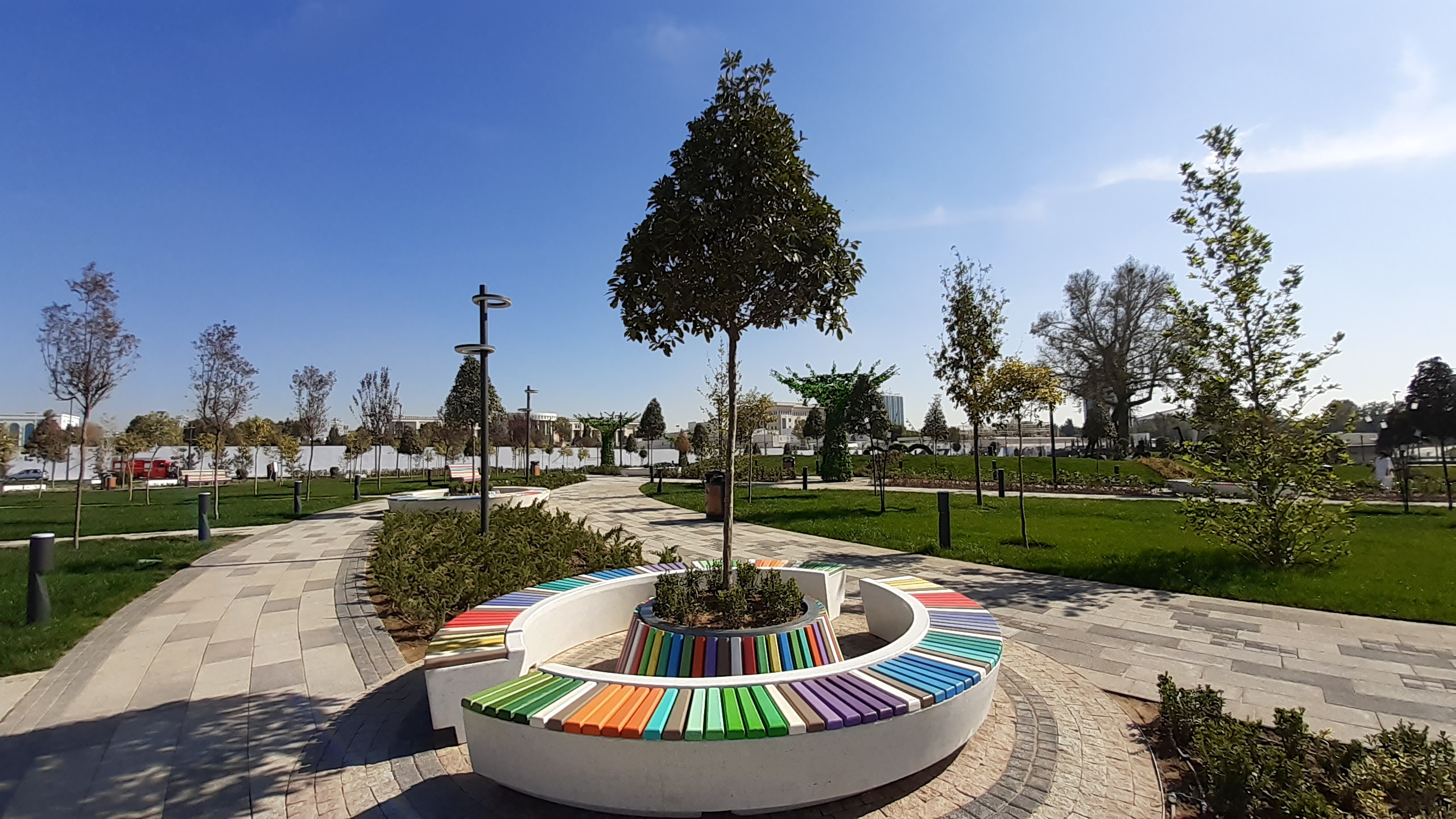

Tashkent City Park is a city park in the center of Tashkent, the largest recreational park area in Uzbekistan. Located on the territory of the international business center Tashkent City.

== Emergencies ==
- On October 27, 2019, a worker fell from the eighth floor of a building under construction.
