= ExecuStay =

American company

- Founded: 1987
- Products: Extended stay hotels
- Website: http://www.execustay.com/

ExecuStay is a provider of temporary, furnished, corporate relocation and insurance housing for stays of 30 days or longer, located in 45 regions in the United States and maintaining over 6,000 temporary homes.

== History ==
ExecuStay was founded in 1987 and was one of the first corporate housing providers to offer its stock for sale to the public in August 1997. ExecuStay Corporation was purchased by Marriott International in 1999, and was renamed ExecuStay by Marriott. In March 2002, the name was changed to Marriott ExecuStay.

Between 1999 and 2002, the annual revenue of ExecuStay increased from $1 million to more than $50 million in less than 3 years. In less than two years, the division’s available apartments increased from 180 to 800 units. The geographic coverage of ExecuStay also expanded into nearby Connecticut, New Jersey, Westchester, and Long Island, in a time when the concept of corporate housing was considered a feature of Manhattan's real estate market.

In April 2012, Marriott sold ExecuStay to Oakwood Worldwide Corporate housing.
