= Roomzzz Aparthotels =

Apartment hotel company in the United Kingdom

Roomzzz Ltd.
- Type: Private
- Industry: Hospitality
- Founded: 2006
- Headquarters: Leeds, England, UK
- Number of locations: 11
- Area served: United Kingdom
- Website: www.roomzzz.com

Roomzzz Aparthotels is an apartment hotel company based in Leeds, England. It has 11 sites across 8 cities, in the United Kingdom as of March 2024.

Roomzzz has re-developed various historical buildings across the United Kingdom.
