= Tashkent City Park =

City park in Uzbekistan

- Tashkent City bog`i
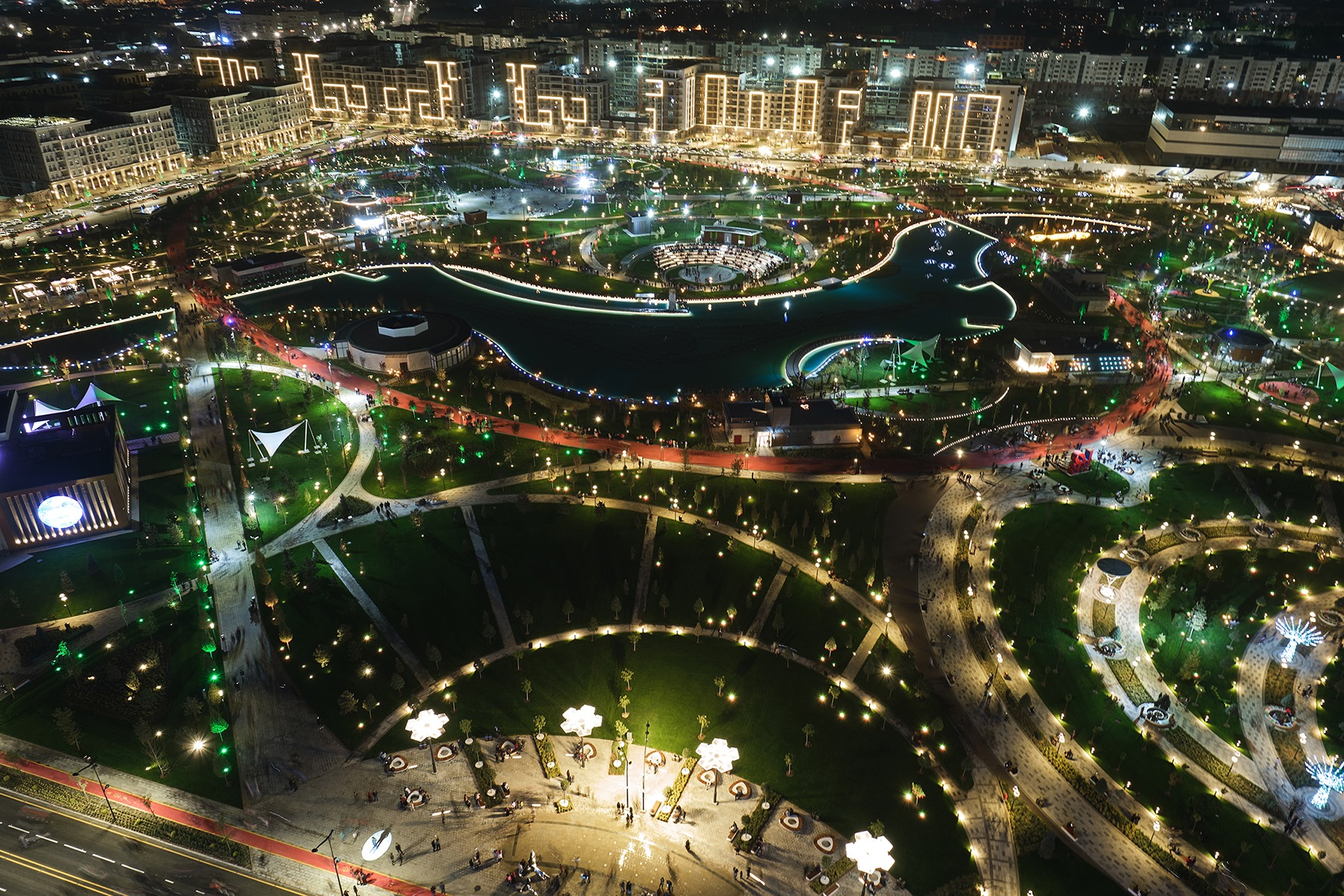
- Interactive map of Tashkent City Park
- Location: Shayxontoxur district, Tashkent, Uzbekistan
- Coordinates: 41°19′00″N 69°14′55″E
- Area: 18,68
- Created: 2019
- Status: Recreational area
- Public transit: Nations' Friendship Paxtakor; Alisher Navoi Uzbekistan
- Website: https://tcibc.uz

Tashkent City Park (Uzbek: Tashkent City bog`i) is a city park in the center of Tashkent, the largest recreational park area in Uzbekistan. Located on the territory of the international business center Tashkent City.

The functional model of the park, within which scenarios for using the park territory were programmed, was developed by the Russian company KB Strelka.

The designers of the park were the companies Prime Tower Group, Özgüven mimarlik (Turkey) and Spectrum (Russia), and the developer of the landscape concept was SF Landscape Architecture (Italy). The landscape design of the park, including the arrangement of green spaces, was developed by the Turkish company MDesign.

The general contractor for the project was Discover Invest.

The official opening of the park took place on October 13, 2019.

== History ==
Tashkent City Park, as part of the Tashkent City IBC project, was built on the site of the demolished Olmazor and Ukchi neighborhoods.

On July 3, 2018 the public council at the Tashkent authority building and the directorate of the Tashkent City IBC, together with Strelka KB and Alpha Education, organized a project seminar with the aim of collecting the opinions of active and interested citizens about what kind of park they need, as well as attracting creative people who are ready to offer unique ideas both at the design stage and during the implementation of the park.

Public discussion of a project of this scale was held in Uzbekistan for the first time.

== Historical Monuments ==
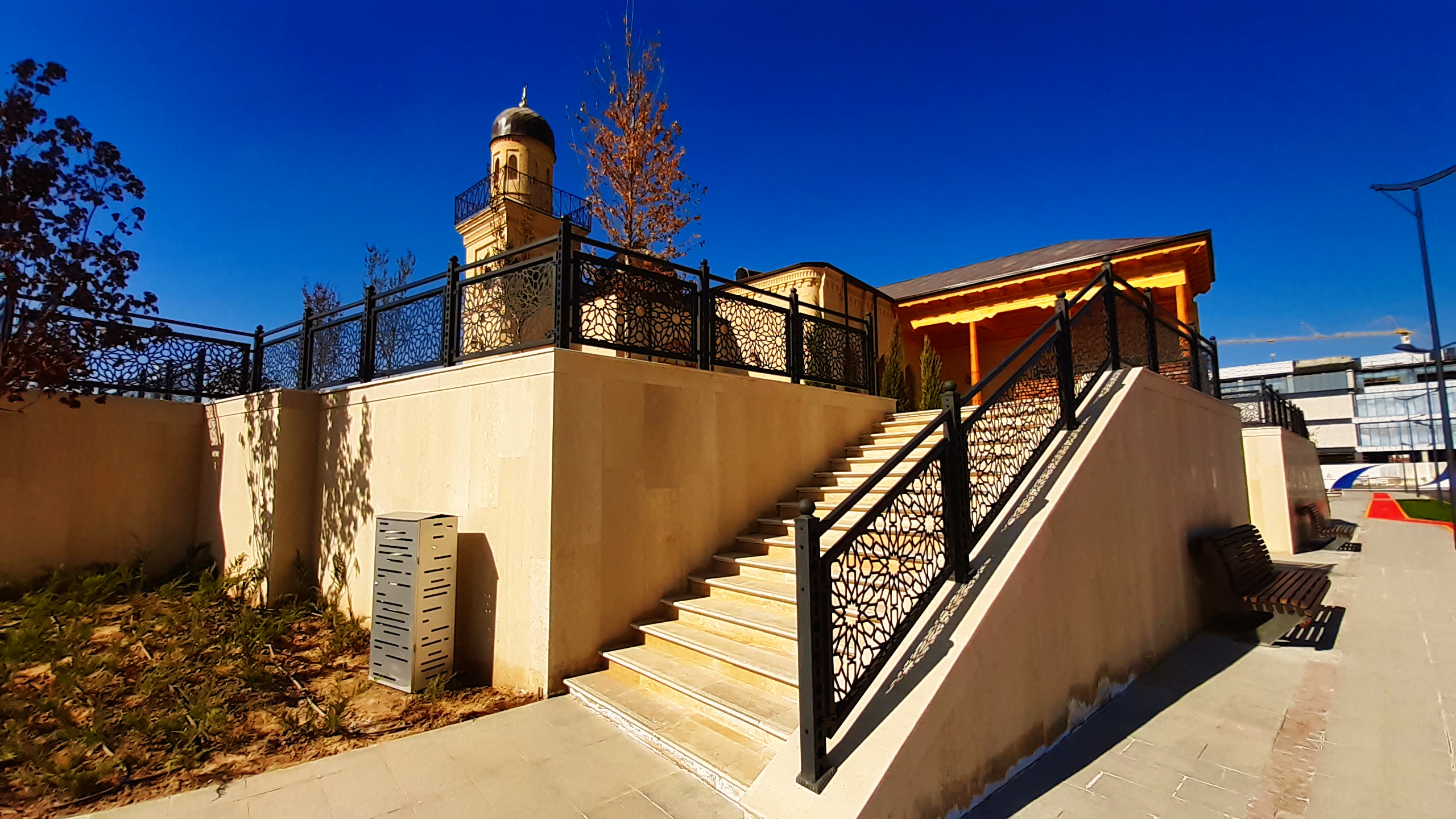
Orifjonboy mosque in Tashkent city Park

There are two cultural heritage sites of Uzbekistan, dating back to the 19th–20th centuries on the territory of the park. During the creation of the park they were preserved and restored:

- Tomb of the Eshonzodas dynasty, where four of its descendants are buried. The representative of the dynasty, Akhmad Eshon Shoshiy Korotoshiy, translated the Holy Qur'an into Uzbek. Currently, the author's manuscripts are stored in the Office of Muslims of Uzbekistan.
- The Orifjonboy mosque, built at the beginning of the 20th century, is one of the first buildings erected in Uzbekistan in the Art Nouveau style. The mosque bears the name of its creator, at whose expense the construction was organized.

== Objects ==
=== Vegetation ===
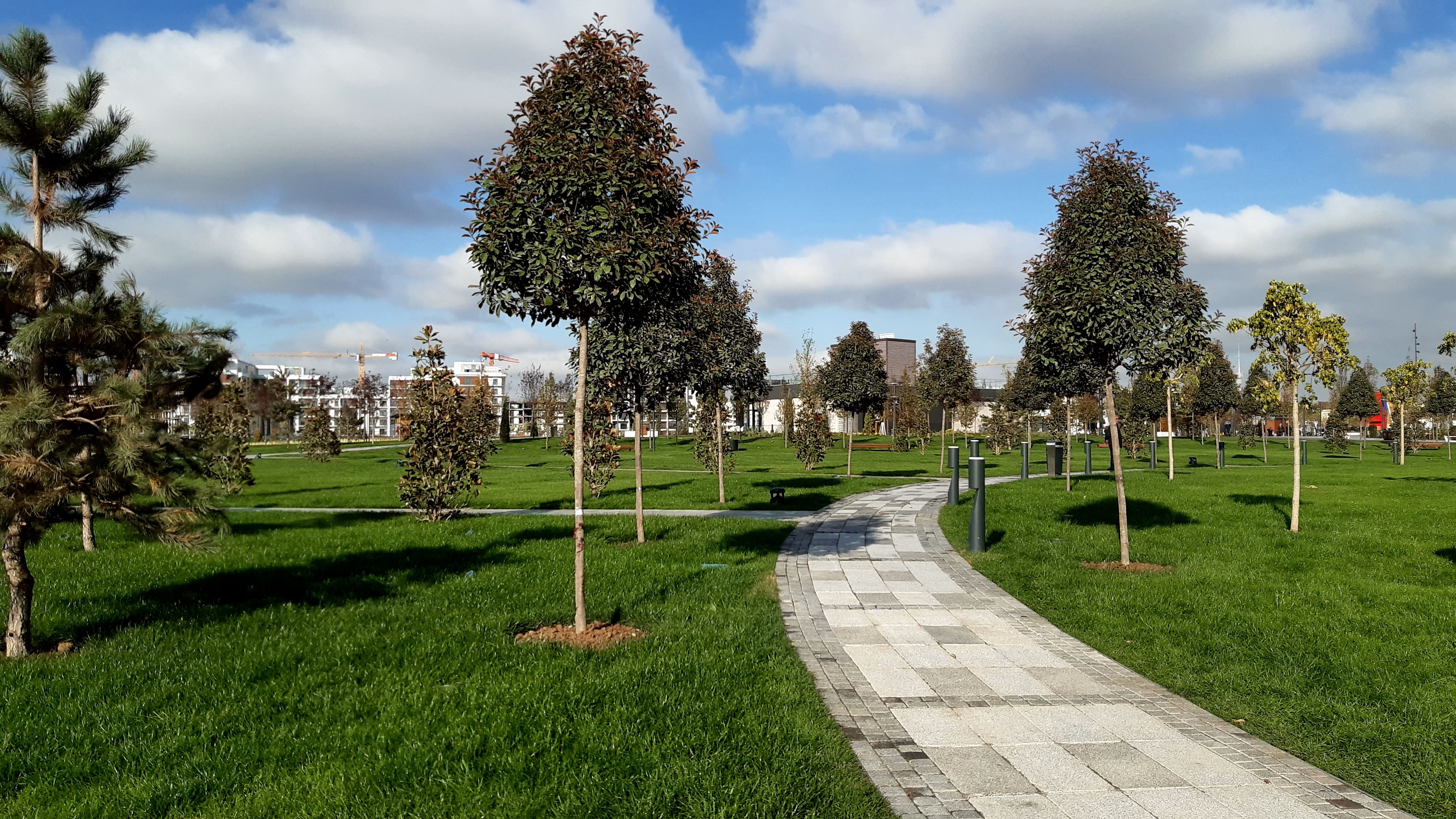
Youth trees in Tashkent City Park

More than 4,500 fast-growing trees have been planted in the park.

The planting of exclusive plants was carried out by the Turkish company Natural Peyzaj, the plants themselves were supplied from Italian nurseries Vanucci Piante, Giorgio Tesi Group and the Krasnodar Territory.

Among the trees in the park are large-flowered magnolia, Austrian and common black pine, oriental thuja, Pissardi plum, pedunculate oak, silver birch, Indian lilac, standard oleanders, various types of maple, etc. Some seedlings were specially brought from Italy.

=== Lake ===
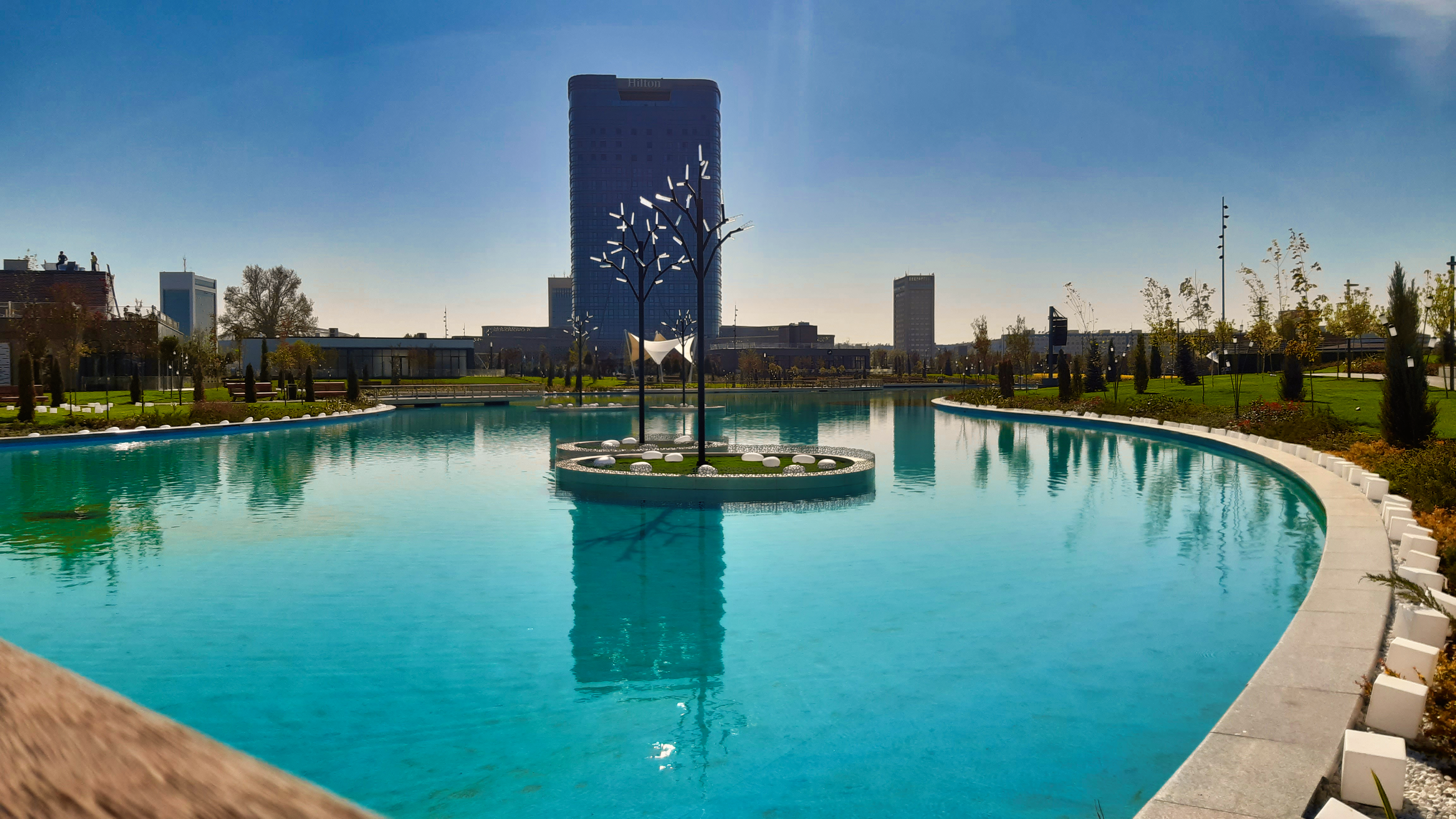
An Artificial lake with musical fountain in Tashkent City Park

The area of the artificial reservoir in the center of the park is 15 hectares. In the center of the lake there is a musical fountain 200 meters long. During the show, a stream of water is shot to a height of 80 meters.

The length of the central bridge across the lake is 50 meters, and the side bridges are 18 meters. There are many restaurants and coffee shops along the lake shore.

=== Tashkent Planetarium ===
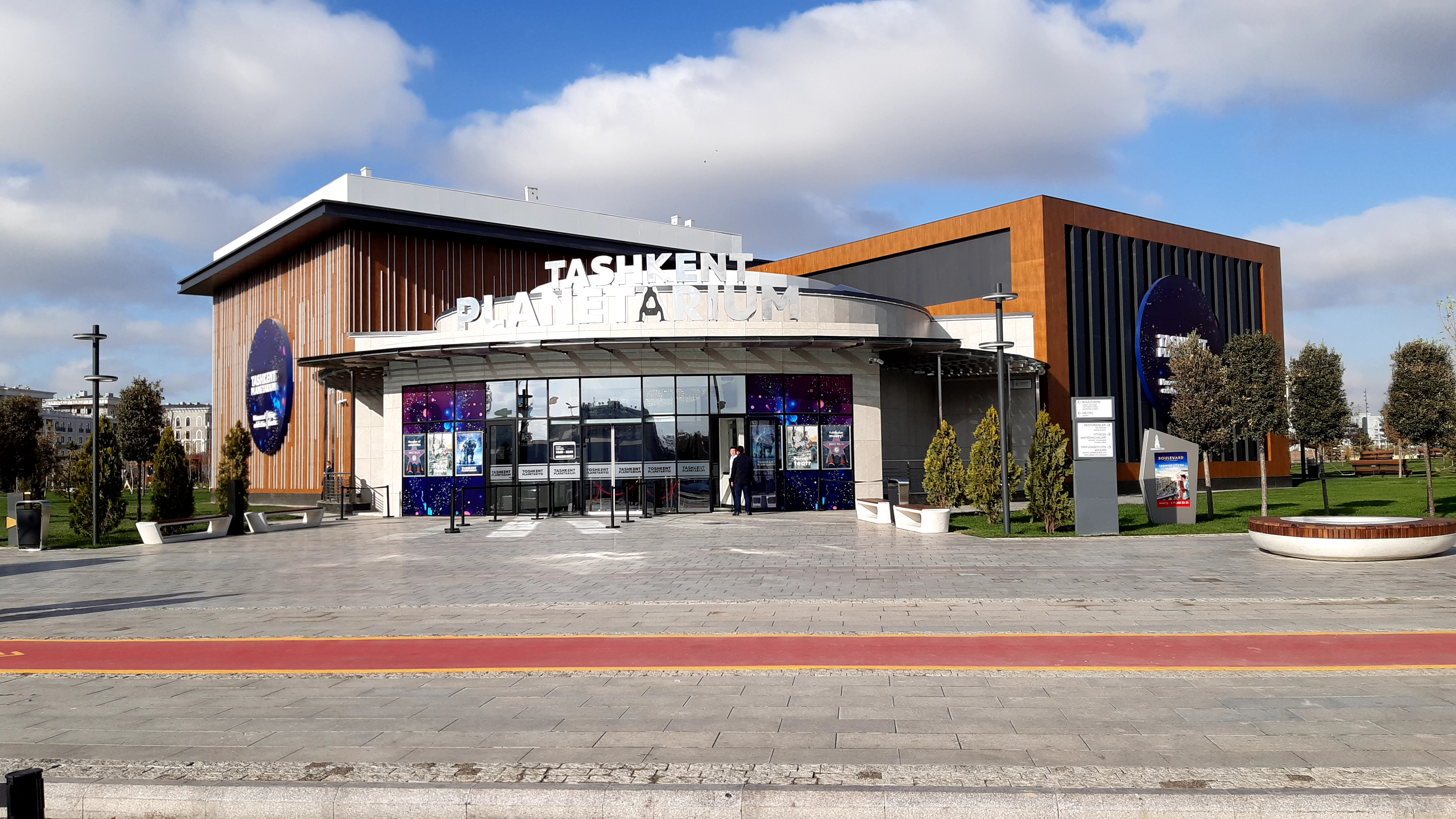
Tashkent Planetarium

The Tashkent Planetarium building consists of several parts. Among them:

- Wax museum “Museum of stars”
- 7D cinema "Flying Theater"
- Planetarium "Tashkent Planetarium"

The wax museum houses figures of Queen Elizabeth II, Donald Trump, Marilyn Monroe, Arnold Schwarzenegger, Dwayne Johnson, Bruce Willis, Charlie Chaplin, Mr. Bean, Captain Jack Sparrow, Mark Zuckerberg, Bill Gates, Albert Einstein and Mike Tyson and others.

The duration of a session in the planetarium is 25 minutes.

=== Amphitheater ===
The park has an amphitheater with a capacity of 450 seats. The amphitheater offers the best view of the musical fountain with a laser show and special effects.

=== Sports and children's playgrounds ===
On the territory of the park there is a children's playground with an area of 4010 sq.m. and a sports ground with an area of 560 sq.m. There is also a basketball court in the park.

=== Navigation ===
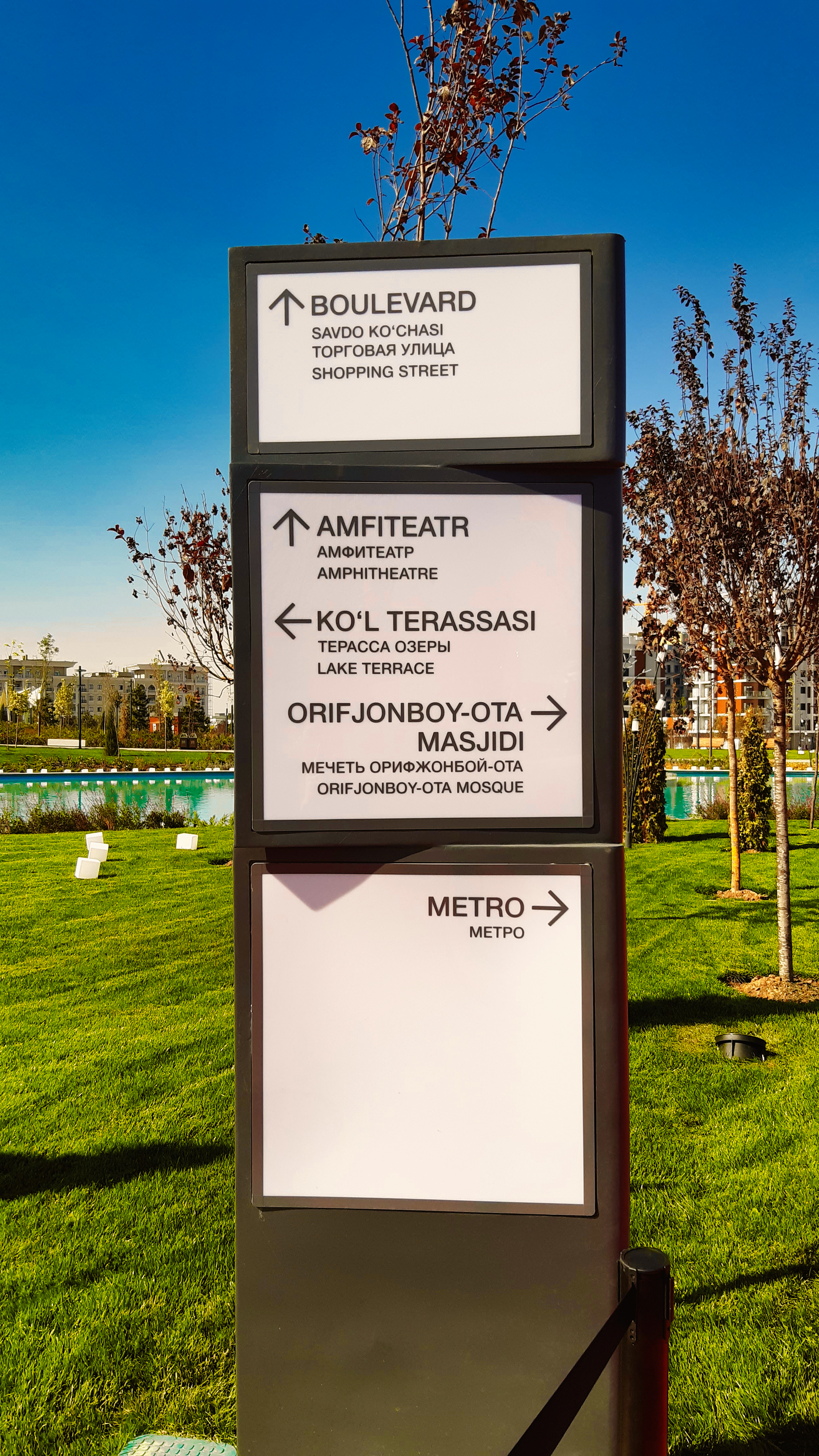
Tashkent City Park navigation

In addition to navigation boards, in various parts of the park there are electronic information kiosks operating in three languages (Uzbek, Russian, English), providing various information and helping to navigate the park.

=== Transport ===
The nearest metro stations to the park – Pakhtakor, Friendship of Nations, Alisher Navoi and Uzbekistan – are within walking distance. There are several public transport stops near the park. Along the perimeter of the park there is a circular bicycle path, 1740 meters long, made of anti-slip material.

== Gallery ==
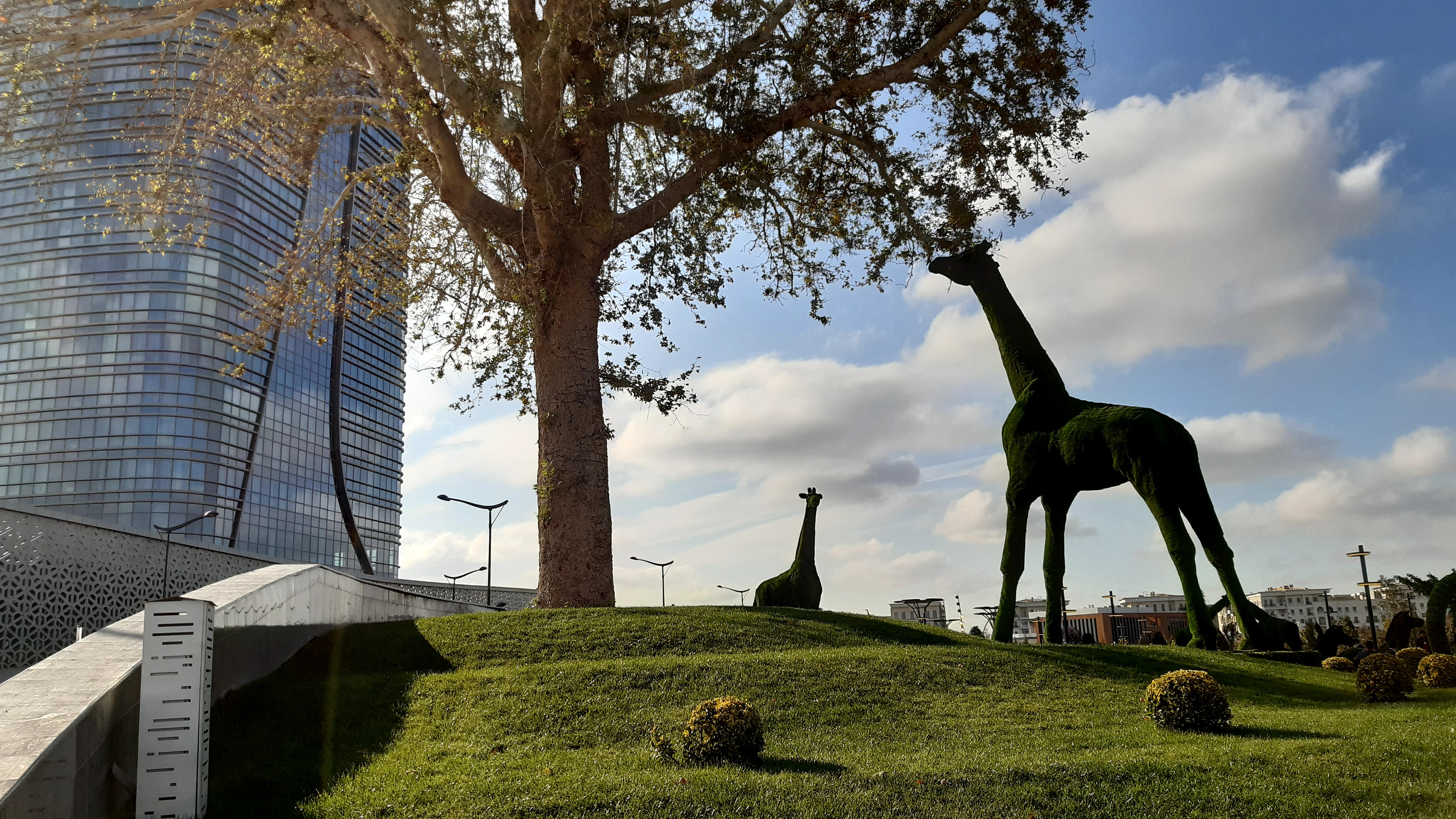

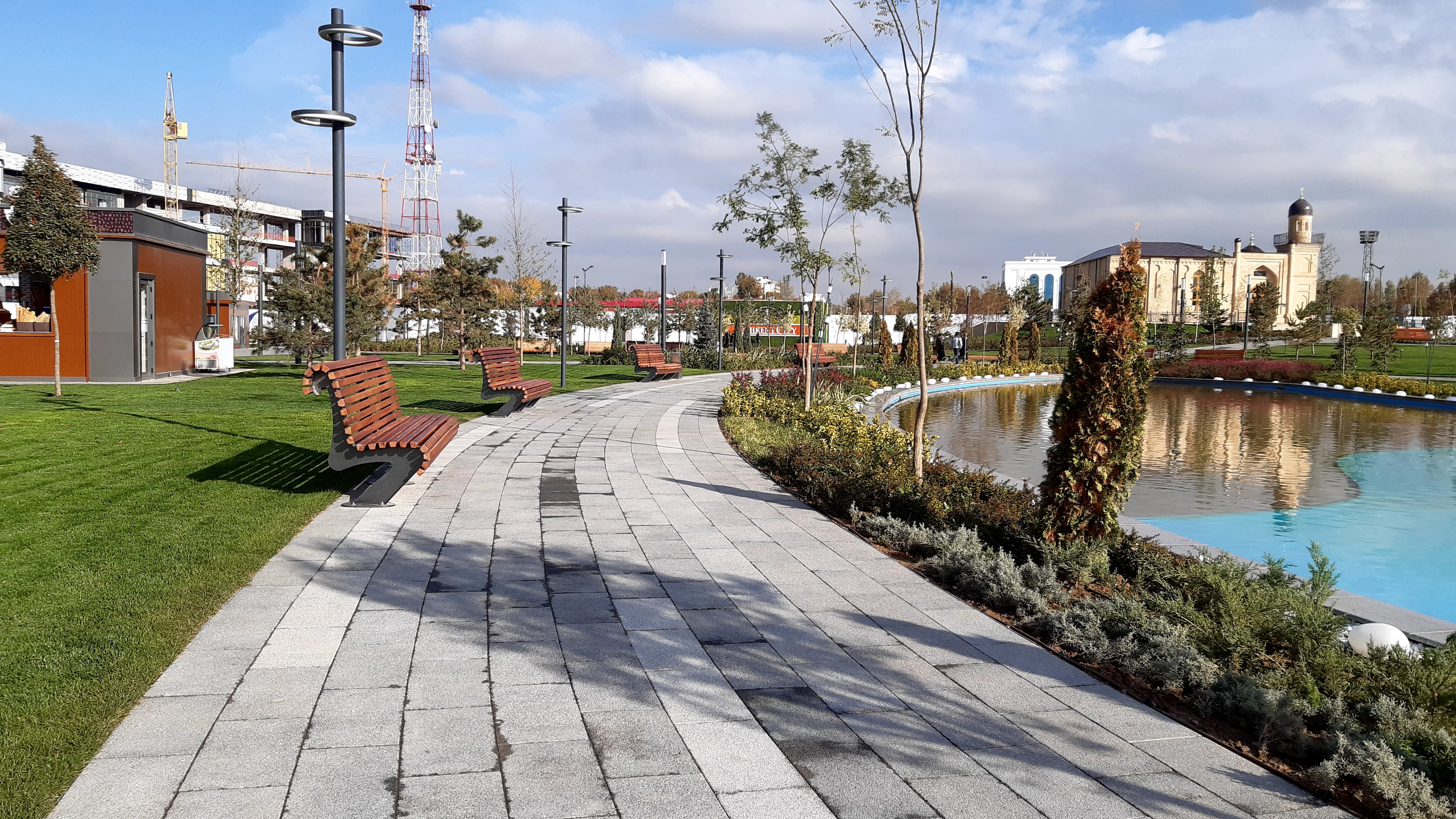

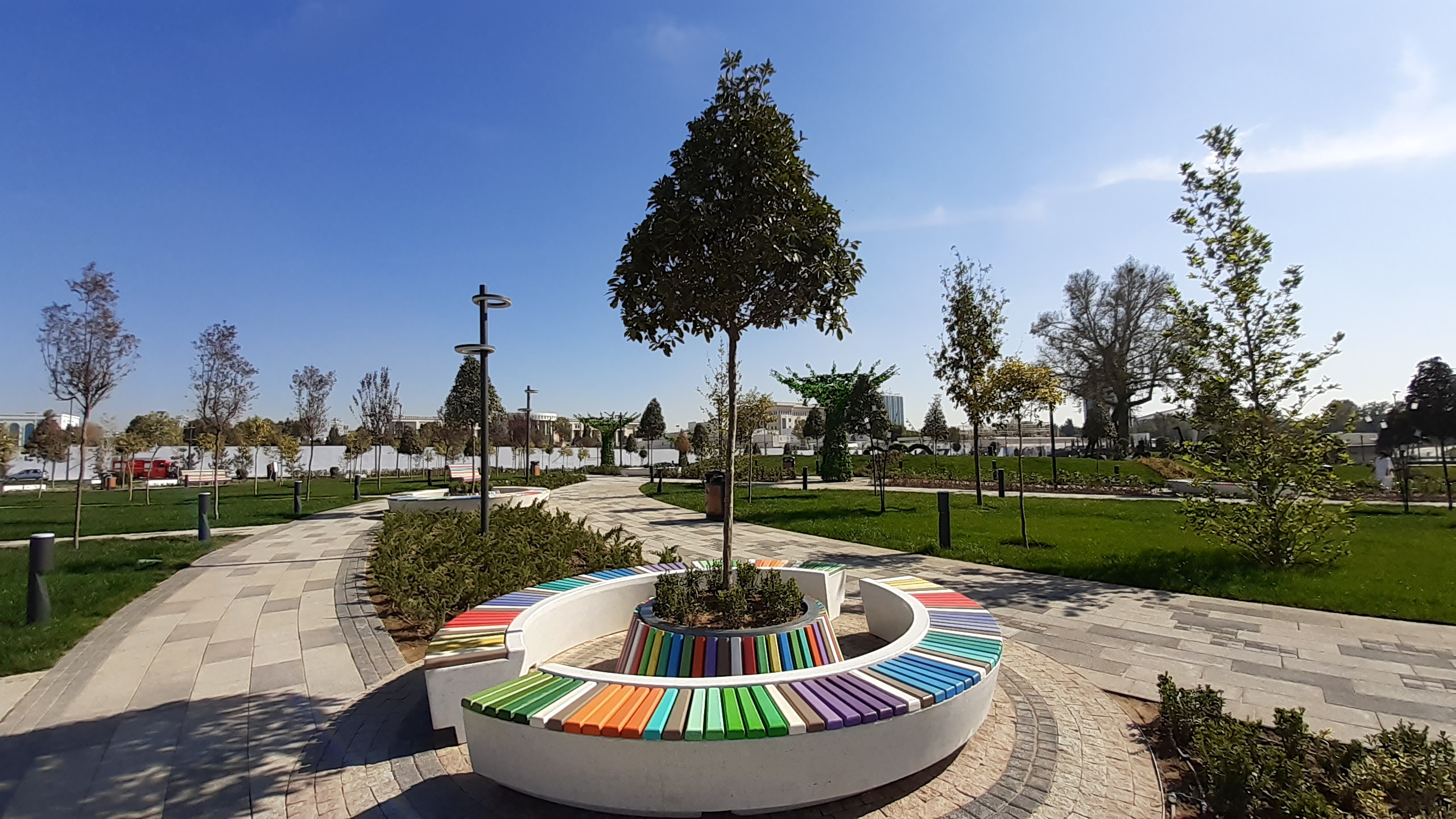

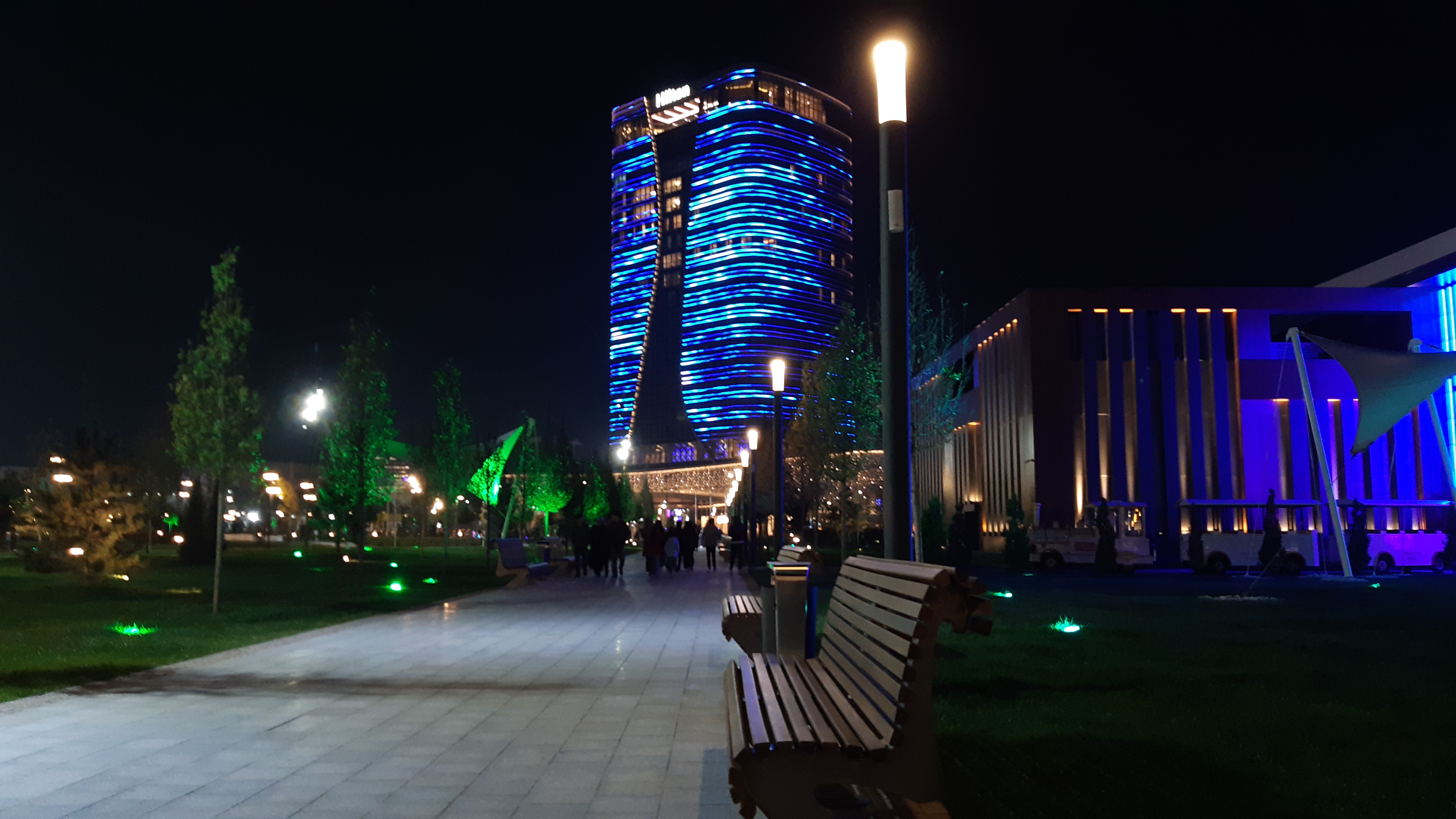

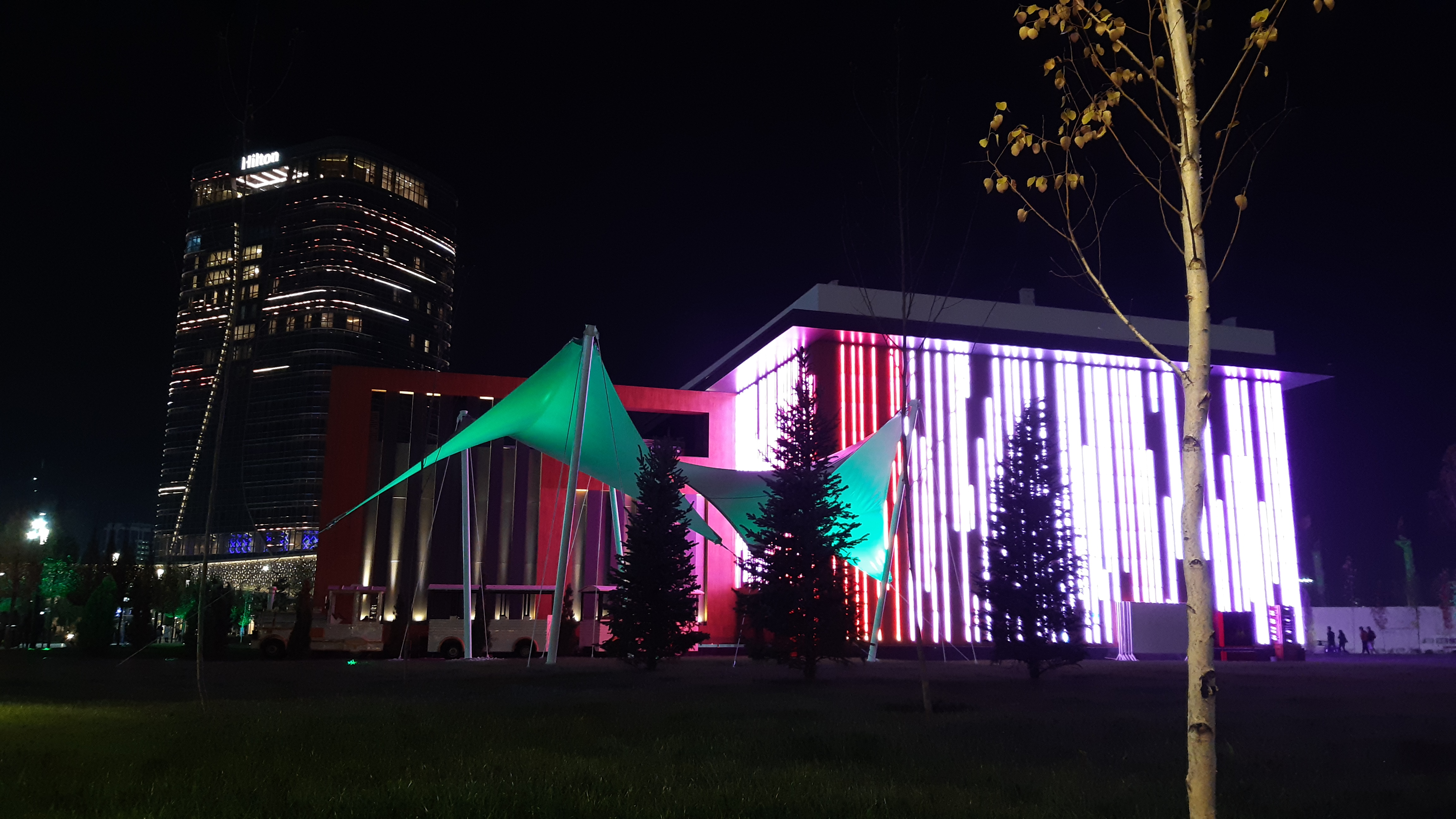

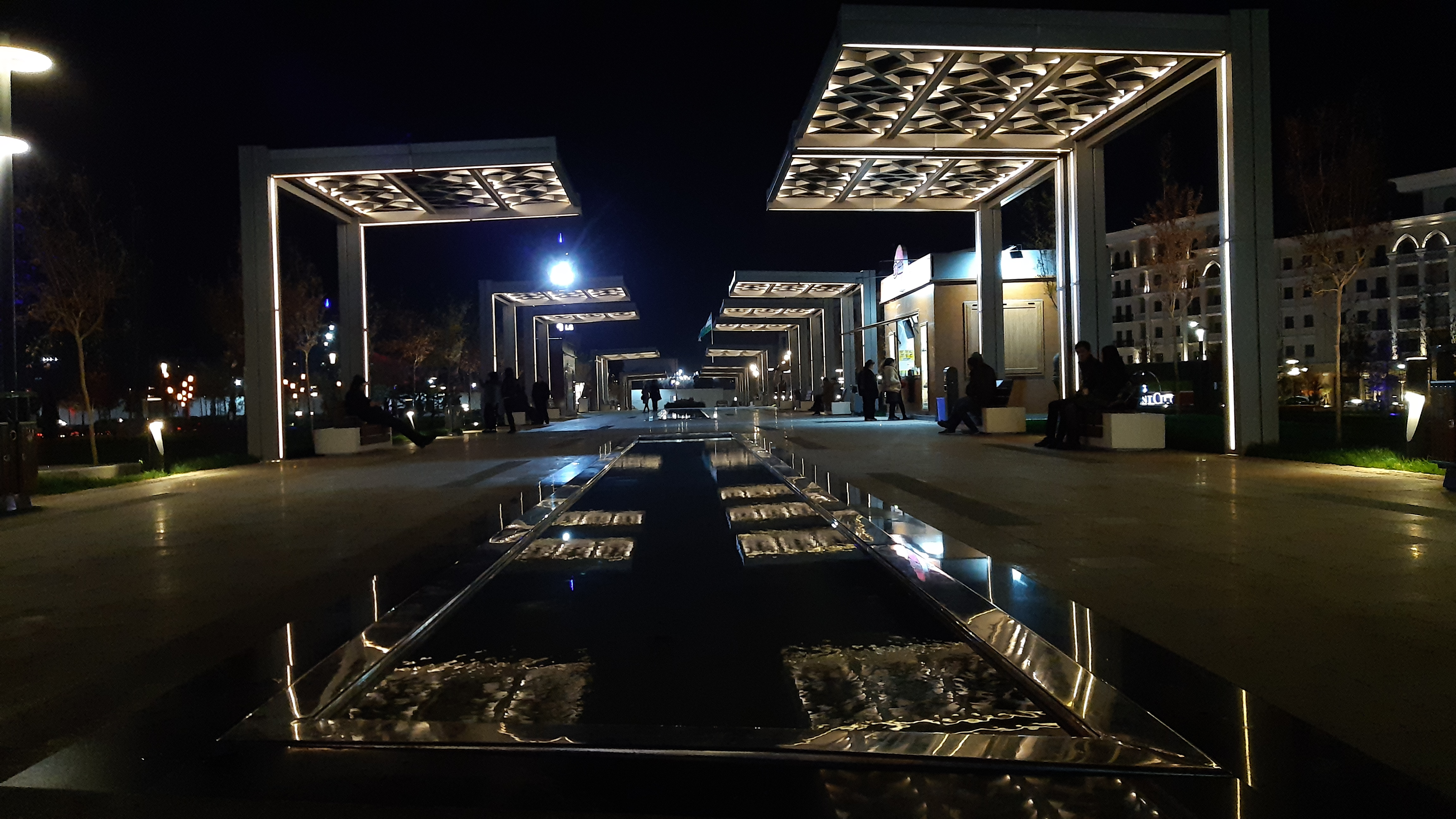

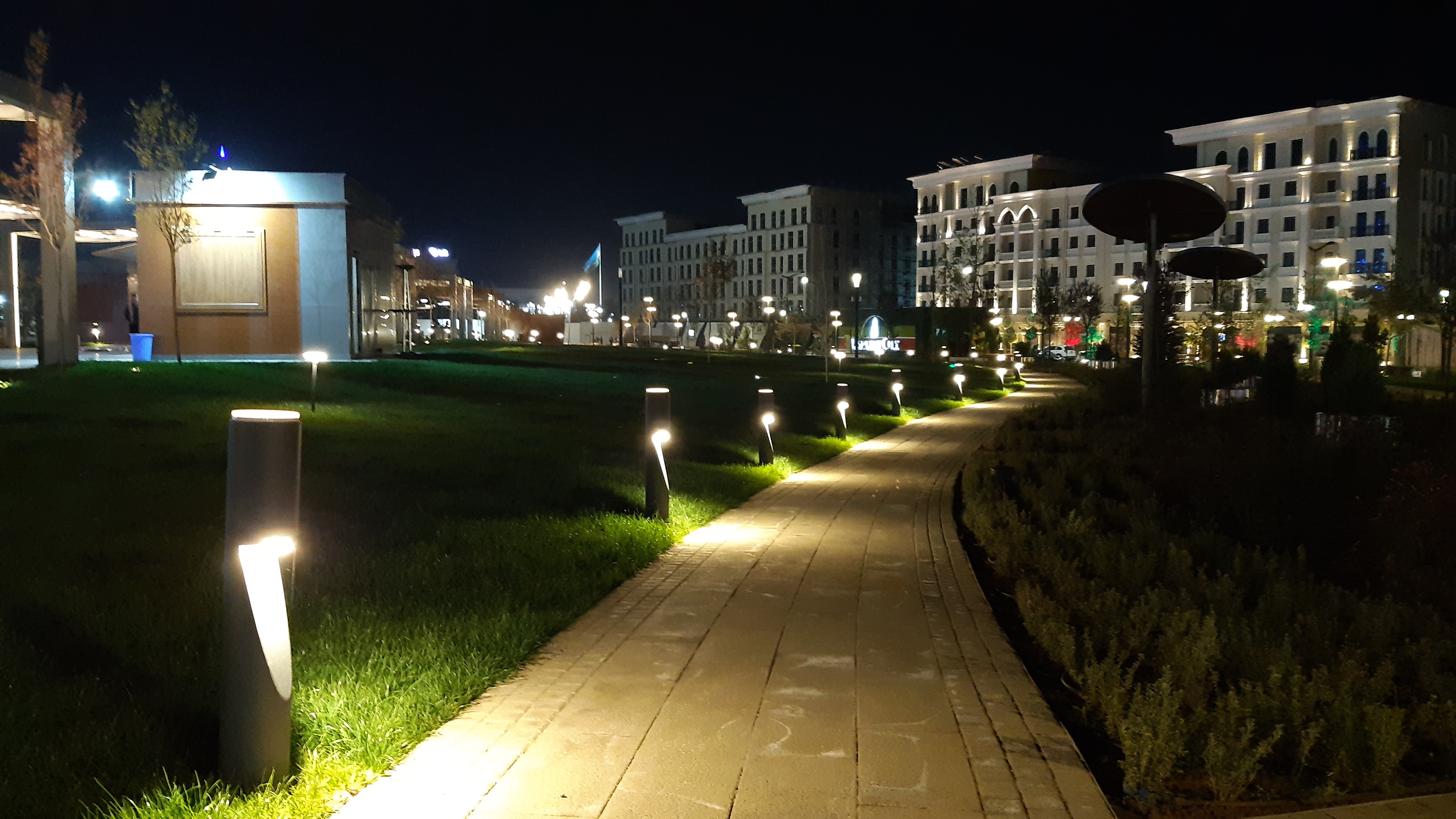

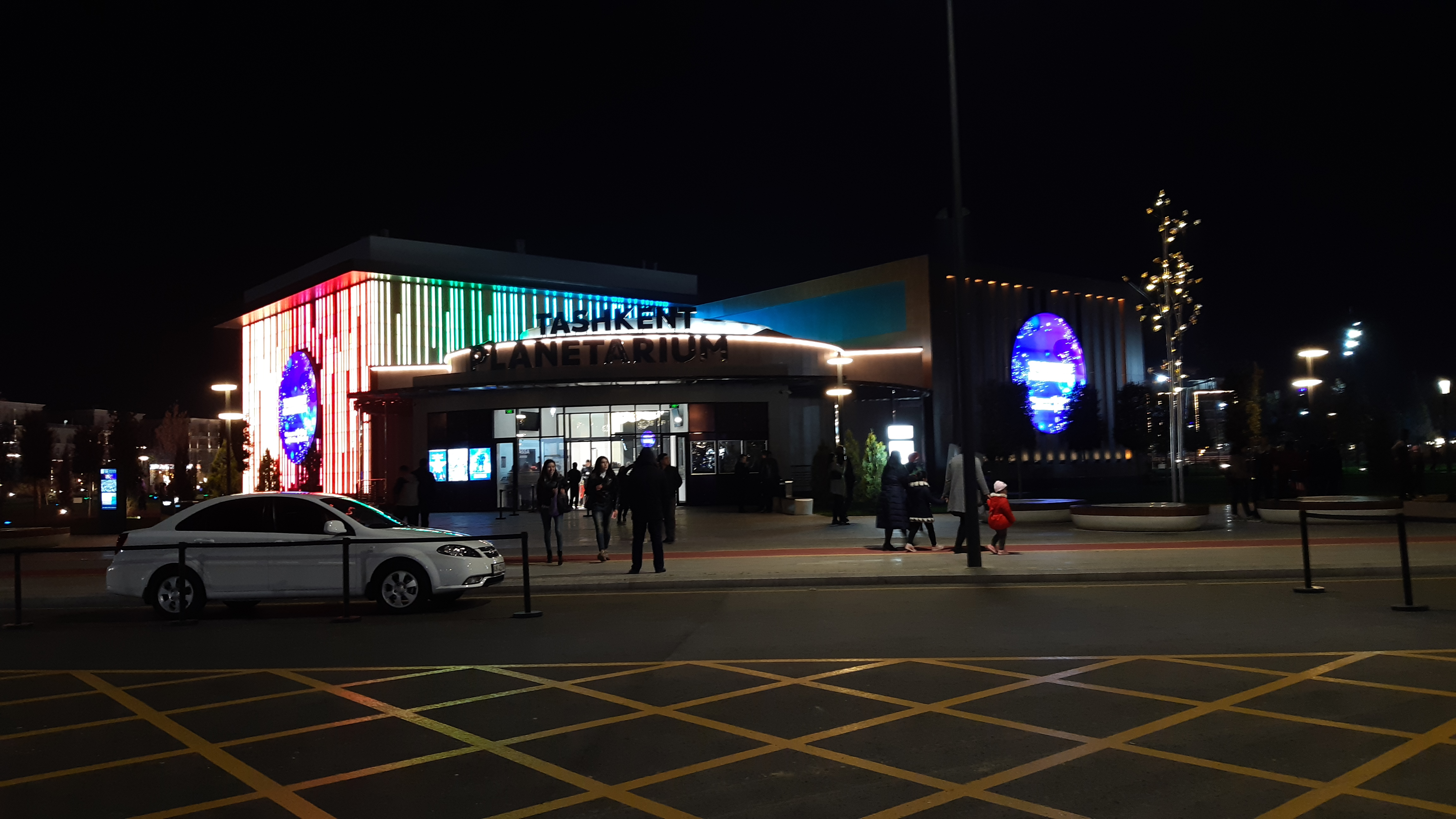
