= Local Law 18 of 2022 =

Short-term rental registration law in New York City

New York City Council
- Long title: A Local Law to amend the administrative code of the City of New York, in relation to registration requirements for short-term rentals
- Citation: Local Law No. 18 (2022)
- Territorial extent: New York City
- Enacted by: New York City Council
- Enacted: January 9, 2022
- Commenced: September 5, 2023

Related legislation
- Multiple Dwelling Law, Housing Maintenance Code
- Status: In force

Local Law 18 of 2022 or Short-Term Rental Registration Law is a municipal law enacted by the New York City to regulate short-term rental activity. The law requires hosts to register their listings with the city and prohibits booking platforms from processing transactions for unregistered rentals. It was signed into law on January 9, 2022, and enforcement began on September 5, 2023.

== Background ==
Short-term rentals in New York City have long been subject to regulation under the city’s housing maintenance code and zoning laws. However, the proliferation of platforms such as Airbnb and Vrbo led to widespread non-compliance. By 2018, an estimated 60,000 illegal listings were active on major platforms.

Local Law 18 was introduced to address concerns about housing availability, affordability, and neighborhood stability. The law created a centralized registration system managed by the Mayor’s Office of Special Enforcement (OSE).

== Provisions under this law ==
- Hosts must register with the OSE before listing a property for short-term rental (less than 30 days).
- Only units where the host resides may be rented.
- No more than two guests are allowed at a time.
- Entire apartments cannot be rented for short-term stays.
- Platforms such as Airbnb, Booking.com, and VRBO must verify registration before processing bookings.

Certain buildings, including those with rent-regulated units and NYCHA properties, are listed on a Prohibited Buildings List maintained by the OSE. Units in Class B multiple dwellings, which are legally approved for transient occupancy, are exempt from registration.

== Enforcement and Penalties ==
The application of this law by the Mayor’s Office of Special Enforcement, enforces compliance through inspections, fines, and legal action. Penalties for violations include:

- Fines ranging from $100 to $5,000 per violation.
- Revocation of registration for non-compliant hosts.
- Denial of renewal applications.
- Legal action against operators and platforms facilitating illegal rentals.

== Benefits of Registration ==
Some benefits has been reported as hosts benefit from this law:

- Legal protection and avoidance of fines.
- Visibility on booking platforms.
- Access to support and guidance from OSE.
- Public trust through listing transparency.

The Mayor’s Office of Special Enforcement has streamlined the registration process, reducing average review times to under one week.

The labor union Hotel Trades Council (HTC) views the Short-Term Rental Registration Law (Local Law 18) as a major victory in New York City's fight against illegal hotels. According to HTC, the regulation has led to the removal of tens of thousands of unauthorized listings from platforms like Airbnb, thereby protecting both hospitality workers and city residents. The union emphasizes that the law enhances safety, transparency, and housing availability, while preventing unlicensed property owners from operating unregulated, covert accommodations.

== Impact ==
The number of active short-term rental listings has drastically decreased since enforcement started. By mid-2025, there were only over 3,000 registered listings, down from over 38,000 in early 2023.

The Mayor’s Office of Special Enforcement reports that 40% of registration applications were approved, while over 4,300 were denied due to non-compliance. Notably, more than 550 applications involved rent-regulated units, which are prohibited from short-term rental use.

Opinions on the law were widely divided, according to an article written by Amanda Hoover for WIRED on September 5, 2023. On the one hand, the regulation was seen as a success by municipal officials and tenant activists because it addresses safety and noise issues as well as the housing scarcity. However, Airbnb and the hosts who use the platform blasted the rule for being overly restrictive, even referring to it as a "de facto ban" and claiming that it significantly reduces their revenue and hurts the city's tourism industry.

In February 2024, The New York Times reported a sharp decline in short-term rental listings in New York City following the enforcement of Local Law 18. The law requires hosts to register with the city and mandates that they be physically present during guest stays, effectively banning most entire-apartment rentals for fewer than 30 days. As a result, Airbnb listings dropped from about 22,000 in August 2023 to roughly 2,300 by early 2024. This shift led many landlords to convert former short-term rentals into long-term leases, particularly in neighborhoods like Manhattan and Brooklyn, where the change was most visible.

City officials hailed the law as a success in curbing illegal rentals and protecting housing availability, while Airbnb and many hosts criticized it as overly restrictive. The registration process was described as burdensome, and only a small fraction of applications had been approved by early 2024. Airbnb argued that the new rules made it nearly impossible for regular New Yorkers to participate legally, and some hosts expressed frustration over lost income and limited flexibility. The city, meanwhile, continued to enforce the law aggressively, removing non-compliant listings and issuing fines through its Office of Special Enforcement.

In August 2025, dozens of New York City homeowners and short-term rental hosts rallied at Brooklyn Borough Hall to protest Local Law 18, which they claim has severely restricted their ability to earn income through platforms like Airbnb and VRBO. The law, enacted in September 2023, mandates host presence during guest stays, limits occupancy to two guests, and prohibits internal door locks—provisions that hosts argue undermine privacy and deter bookings. Many now support Intro 1107, a proposed bill that would ease these restrictions for owners of one- to two-family homes by allowing short-term rentals without host presence, increasing guest capacity, and eliminating the “Unlocked Doors Provision”. Critics of the law, including small business owners and host coalitions, contend that it has harmed local economies and failed to improve housing affordability, while tenant advocacy groups like Tenants Not Tourists defend the regulation as essential to curbing displacement and rising rents.

== See also ==
- Rent regulation in New York
- Metropolitan Council on Housing
- New York City Housing Authority
- Gentrification in New York City
