= Corporate housing =

Type of accommodation

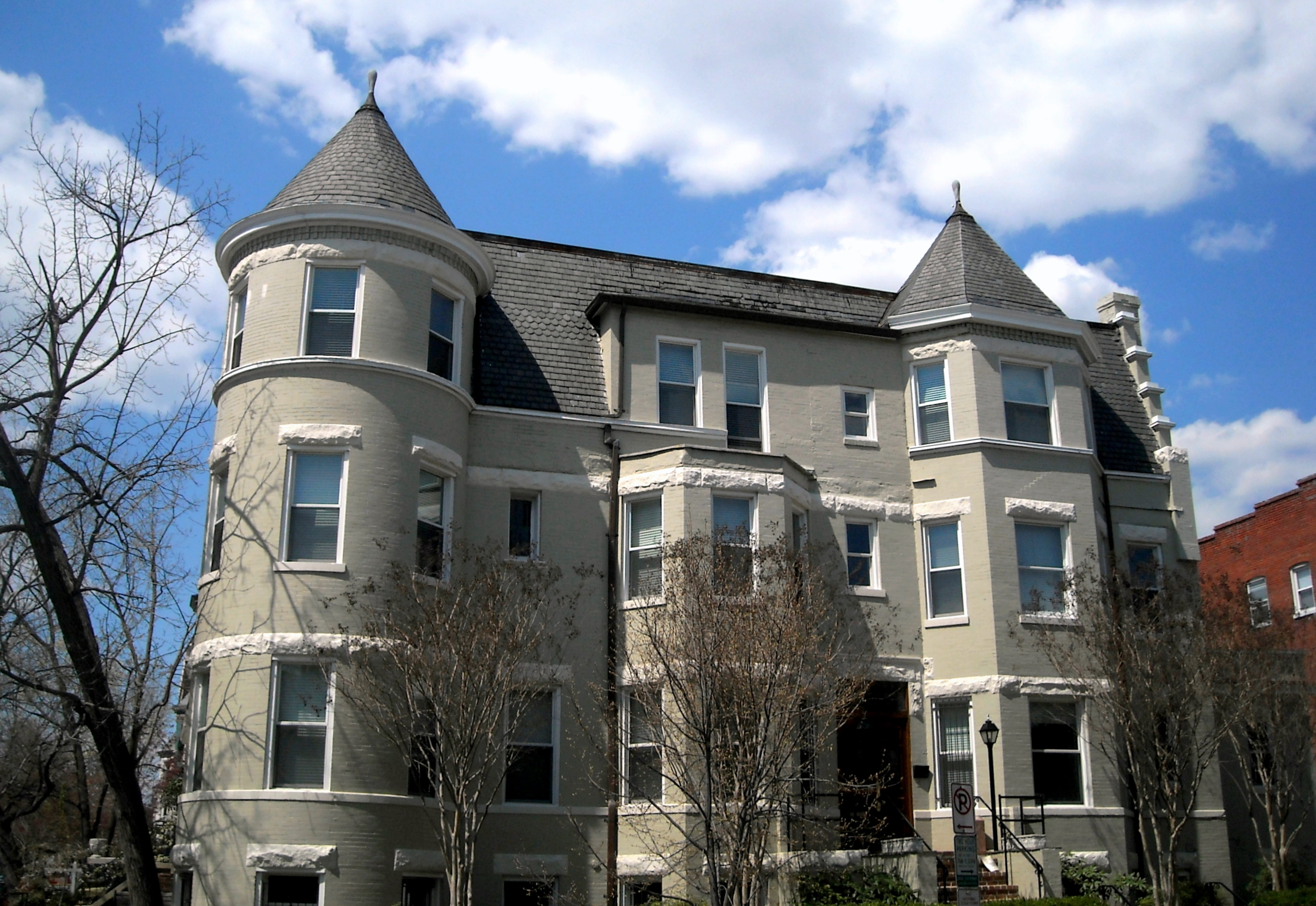
La Maison à Dupont, a corporate apartment building in the Dupont Circle neighborhood of Washington, D.C.

Corporate housing is a term in the relocation industry that implies renting a furnished apartment, condo, or home on a temporary basis to individuals, military personnel, intern groups, or corporations as an alternative to a traditional hotel or an extended hotel stay. According to Corporate Housing Providers Association (CHPA), the industry's trade organization, corporate housing revenue was $10 billion in 2019 and $2.47 billion in 2010. The corporate housing industry has been a significant growth segment of the lodging industry for the past 20 years. As of 2015, the revenue generated by the industry reached $2.93 billion in the US, after a 7% increase over 2014, with an average stay of 84 nights.

Corporate housing and extended stay hotels are two different types of accommodations.

Corporate housing is typically used for stays averaging one month or more (the average corporate housing stay is 83 days, according to the 2011 Highlands Group Corporate Housing report; more than 100 days for Managed Corporate Housing Companies and 13% of CHBO property owners report their properties were rented for a year or longer, according to the 2012 “by Owner” Annual Report).

Corporate housing provides complete temporary housing solutions within a stable residential setting unlike extended stay hotels, which are surrounded by an open parking lot and are filled entirely by transient guests.

The apartments managed by corporate housing companies are furnished and the corporate housing companies rotate clients in and out of the furnished apartments and service them between guests.

There are several types of corporate housing companies. The most common are local, unit-centered housing companies who have local furnished units that they lease and manage like a hotel. There are apartment community created furnished units that are managed by the individual apartment communities that setup, furnish, and manage a small part of their unit inventory as furnished units. The last type of corporate housing company is a client-centered model which actually locates and creates fully furnished units for their clientele. These companies must have elaborate systems in place to employ this model. Corporate housing companies offer options for the corporate traveler or relocating family.

== See also ==
- Vacation rental
- Serviced apartment
