= Apartment hotel =

Type of serviced apartment complex

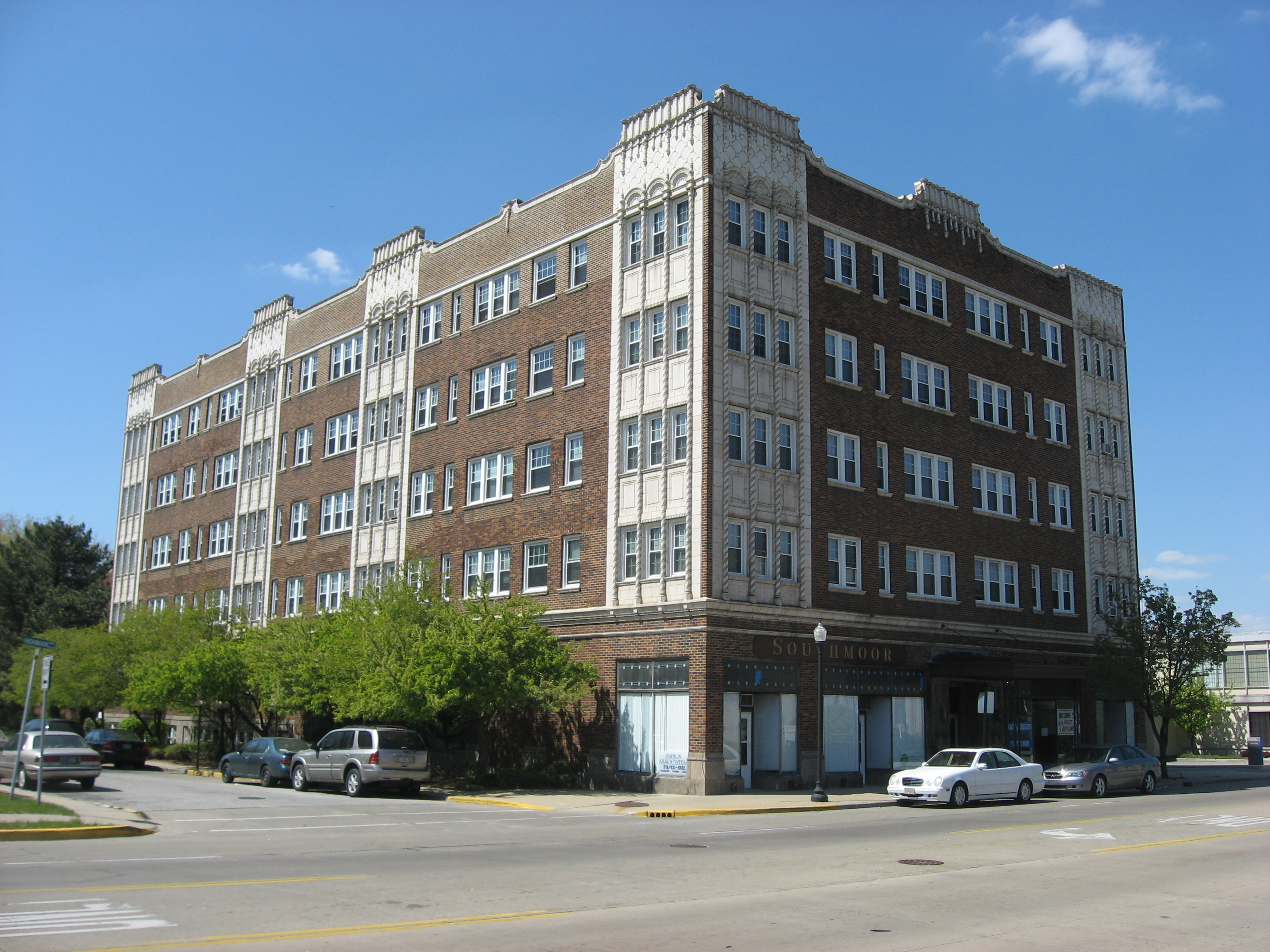
An apartment hotel in Hammond, Indiana

An apartment hotel or aparthotel (also residential hotel or extended-stay hotel) is a serviced apartment complex that uses a hotel-style booking system. It is similar to renting an apartment, but with no fixed contracts and occupants can "check out" whenever they wish, subject to the applicable minimum length of stay imposed by the company.

An apartment hotel complex usually offers a complete fully fitted apartment. These complexes are usually custom built, and similar to a hotel complex containing a varied number of apartments. The length of stay in these apartment hotels is varied with anywhere from a few days to months or even years. The people who stay in apartment hotels use them as long-term accommodation; therefore, the hotels are often fitted with most things the average home would require.

== Origins ==
Apartment hotels were first created in holiday destinations as accommodation for families that needed to "live" in an apartment rather than "stay" as they would in a hotel. The apartments would provide a "holiday home" but generally be serviced. Later, these apartments evolved to be complete homes, allowing occupants to do everything they would at home, such as cleaning, washing, and cooking.

In Los Angeles, California, in the 1800s, small residential hotels began appearing to house single men who worked the fields and the train rail yards. Such places offered inexpensive rent, communal bathrooms or shared rooms located near work environments be they industry or agricultural.

== Extended stay hotels ==
Extended stay hotels, also called serviced apartments or aparthotels are a type of lodging with features unavailable at standard hotels. These features are intended to provide more home-like amenities. There is substantial variation among extended stay hotels with respect to quality and the amenities available. Some of the economy chains attract clientele who use the hotels as semi-permanent lodging. Extended-stay hotels typically have self-serve laundry facilities and offer discounts for extended stays, beginning at 5 or 7 days. They also have guestrooms (or "suites") with kitchens. The kitchens include at a minimum usually: a sink, a refrigerator (usually full size), a microwave oven, and a stovetop. Some kitchens also have dishwashers and conventional ovens. Extended stay hotels are aimed at business travelers on extended assignments, leisure travelers going on extended vacations, families in the midst of a relocation, and others in need of temporary housing.

The Residence Inn chain was launched in 1975 in Wichita, Kansas, by Jack DeBoer, and acquired by Marriott Corporation in 1987. As of April 2005, there were over 450 Residence Inn hotels in the United States, Canada, and Mexico. Staybridge Suites and Candlewood Suites, both owned by the InterContinental Hotels Group, are two examples of hotels designed for business and extended stay travelers. Another brand of extended-stay hotels is Homewood Suites, which is part of Hilton Worldwide. One brand came from the merger of Extended Stay America and Homestead Hotels, which combined in 2004 to become Extended Stay Hotels with over 670 owned and operated properties in the United States. A hotel chain, Choice Hotels International, franchiser for brands such as Comfort Inn, Comfort Suites, Sleep Inn, and Quality Inn, operate the MainStay Suites brand. They acquired the Suburban Extended Stay hotel chain in 2005, with over 150 hotels open and under development. The low-budget extended stay chain Intown Suites was founded in 1988, with 139 locations in 21 states. Since 1999 the U.S. budget lodging chain Motel 6, owned by The Blackstone Group (previously Accor), operates Studio 6, a chain of extended stay hotels with weekly rates. The chain provides a kitchen area in its rooms, and allows pets, and operates in 18 U.S. states and Canada. In the UK, Roomzzz were the first national aparthotel chain to open in 2006. There has been a sharp surge in business travel in India over the last few years with India becoming more integrated with the global economy and serviced apartment demand is going to increase significantly. There are many serviced apartments player like PAJASA having more 3000+ inventory is market working for corporates.

The Ascott Limited is a serviced apartment group that has over 70,000 properties over 190 cities in more than 30 countries.

== Single room occupancy ==
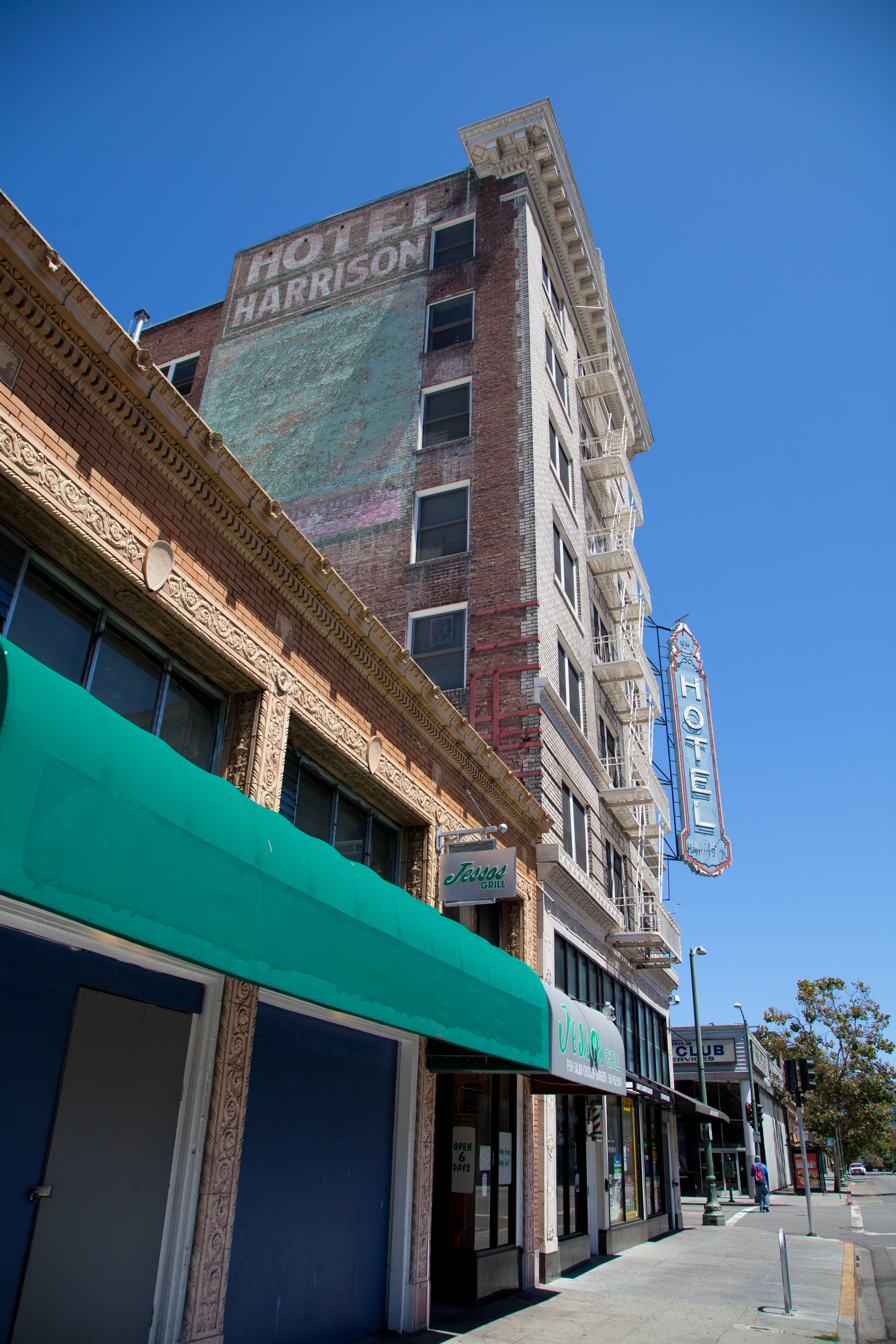
The Harrison Hotel, an SRO hotel in Oakland, California.

Single room occupancy hotels (more commonly abbreviated to SRO), also called "residential hotels", are a form of housing that is typically aimed at residents with low or minimal incomes. They usually rent small single rooms with limited or shared amenities such as kitchens, toilets or bathrooms as permanent or primary residence to individuals, within a multi-tenant building with shared kitchens, toilets or bathrooms. SRO units are typically 8 feet by ten feet. While roommates sharing an apartment may also have a bedroom and share a bathroom and kitchen, an SRO tenant leases the SRO unit individually. SRO units are the least expensive form of non-subsidized rental housing, with median rents even in New York City ranging from $450 to $705 per month.

SROs may constitute a form of affordable housing, in some cases for formerly or otherwise homeless individuals. The term is primarily used in Canada and US. Since the 1970s and 1980s, there has been an increasing displacement of SRO units aimed at low-income earners due to gentrification, with SRO facilities being sold and turned into condos. Between 1955 and 2013, almost one million SRO units were eliminated in the US due to regulation, conversion or demolition. The hotels were once a ubiquitous feature of densely populated urban centers, filling a crucial niche as flexible, inexpensive housing with bare-minimum amenities. Housing regulations mandating higher standards of amenities, such as requiring off-street parking, or private kitchens and/or bathrooms in each unit, have rendered the construction of conventional SRO hotels illegal in many cities. That existing hotels are substandard under such regulations has been often used as justification for their demolition, often as part of urban renewal programs.

The term refers to the fact that the tenant rents a single room, as opposed to a full flat (apartment). SRO units may be provided in a rooming house, apartment building, or in illegal conversions of private homes into many small SRO rooms. There is a variety of levels of quality, ranging from a "cubicle with a wire mesh ceiling", at the lowest end, to small hotel rooms or small studio apartments without bathrooms, at the higher end. They may also be referred to as "SRO hotels", which acknowledges that many of the buildings are old hotels that are in a poor state of repair and maintenance. The acronym SRO has also been stated to mean "single resident only".

== See also ==
- Short-term rental
- Studio apartment
- Corporate housing
- Condo hotel
