= Short-term rental =

Dwelling rented for short periods

Short-term rentals (STR) are furnished lodging rented for short periods of time. They can be used as alternatives to hotels for vacation rentals and housing during relocation. They are usually reserved via online marketplaces.

== Regulations ==
Regulations have been imposed on short-term rental platforms after proponents argued that short-term rental has reduced affordable housing and contributed to the increase of long-term rental prices due to changes in housing supply and demand; short-term rentals can be more lucrative than long-term rentals for landlords and also attract investors who bid up housing prices. Supporters of short-term rentals argue that the impact on housing prices has been minimal and that the way to increase affordable housing is to increase the housing supply. Examples include Lisbon, where a moratorium on short-term rentals did not reduce housing costs; it only increased hotel prices.

In rare cases, landlords have been accused of illegally evicting tenants to convert properties into short-term rentals to obtain higher rents.

The hotel industry has lobbied for additional regulations on short-term rentals, which compete with hotels. Short-term rental platforms also use lobbying to promote their interests.

In addition to government-imposed restrictions, many homeowner associations also limit short-term rentals. Neighborhood community groups have voiced concern that short-term residents can cause issues with congestion, noise, and safety.

Regulation of short-term rentals can include requirements for hosts to have business licenses, payment of hotel taxes, limitations on the number of days that a space is rented, requirements for hosts to occupy the space, and compliance with building, city and zoning standards.

=== Regulations by jurisdiction ===
==== Europe ====
- Amsterdam: Hosts can rent their properties for up to 30 nights per year to a group of no more than four at a time. Short-term rentals are banned in certain areas.
- Barcelona: Licenses and higher property taxes are required. All short-term rentals will be banned in November 2028.
- Berlin: Licenses are required. Hosts must live in most of the property.
- Budapest: Licenses and taxation are required; short-term rentals are banned in certain areas.
- Ireland: Licenses are required. Short-term rentals are restricted to a maximum of 90 days per year for primary residences.
- Lisbon: Licenses are required. Short-term rentals are limited to 10% of the housing stock.
- London: Short-term rentals are limited to 90 days per year.
- Lucerne: Short-term rentals are limited to 90 days per year.
- Madrid: Listings without private entrances are banned.
- Palma de Mallorca: Short-term rentals are banned.
- Paris: Hosts can rent their homes for no more than 120 days per year. Licenses are required.
- Rome: Short-term rental sites are required to withhold a 21% rental income tax.
- Venice: Hosts must collect and remit tourist taxes.
- Vienna: Short-term rentals are banned in specific "residential zones" within the city, with the exemption of apartments occupied by the host.

==== United States ====
- Boston, Massachusetts: Short-term rentals are only allowed in owner-occupied condominiums, single-family, two-family, and three-family buildings. Registration is required.
- Chicago, Illinois: Licenses are required. Single-night stays are prohibited.
- Jersey City, New Jersey: Hosts are only allowed to rent for 60 days per year.
- Las Vegas, Nevada: Owners must occupy the property; must be away from casinos, licenses are required, limited to 1% of housing stock.
- Los Angeles, California: Hosts must register with the city planning department and pay an $89 fee and cannot home-share for more than 120 days in a calendar year.
- Miami, Florida: Short-term rentals are banned in most neighborhoods, in part due to lobbying efforts of the hotel industry.
- New York City, New York: Licenses are required. Rentals under 30 days are prohibited unless the host is present on the property.
- Phoenix, Arizona: Most regulations are not allowed since municipalities are prohibited from interfering in property rights.
- Portland, Oregon: The number of bedrooms in a single unit that may be listed is limited.
- San Diego, California: Units for short-term rental are limited to 1% of the housing stock and licenses are required.
- San Francisco, California: Registration by hosts is required.
- Santa Cruz, California: Local Board of supervisors discussed parking restrictions in the areas where there are many short-term rentals, in order to discourage people from staying there, and prioritize the local residents' ability to park.
- Santa Monica, California: Licenses are required. Hosts are prohibited from listing multiple properties.
- Seattle, Washington: Licenses are required. Hosts cannot rent more than two units.
- Washington, D.C.: Licenses are required. If the host does not live on the property, rentals are limited to 90 days each year.
- Weehawken, New Jersey: Short-term rentals under 30 days are banned.
- West New York, New Jersey: Short-term rentals under 30 days are banned.

==== Canada ====
- Montreal: Short-term rentals must be in a host's primary residence. Only allowed between June 10 and September 10. Prohibited in certain districts.
- Toronto: Licenses are required. Short-term rentals must be in a host's primary residence. Taxes are required.
- Vancouver: Licenses are required; cost C$1,108/year. Short-term rentals must be in a host's primary residence.

==== Asia ====
- Japan: Licenses are required; a home can be rented for a maximum of 180 days per year.
- Singapore: Short-term home rentals of less than three months for private properties or less than six months for Housing and Development Board flats are illegal.
- Taiwan: Short-term rentals require approval, a hotel business license, and must pass safety inspections and provide public accident insurance; many short-term rentals are illegal.

==== South America ====
- Brazil: Under the Brazilian Tenancy Law, a residential property may be rented for temporary purposes for a period not exceeding 90 days, whether or not it is furnished. In May 2026, the Superior Court of Justice ruled that the use of units in residential condominiums for short stays offered through digital platforms requires a change in the designated use of the property approved by at least two-thirds of the condominium owners. Short- and medium-term furnished rentals are also offered by Brazilian services such as Shortstay, which provides furnished apartments with flexible rental periods and digital contracts.

== See also ==
- Apartment hotel
- Condo hotel
- Vacation property
