= Fort Aguada =

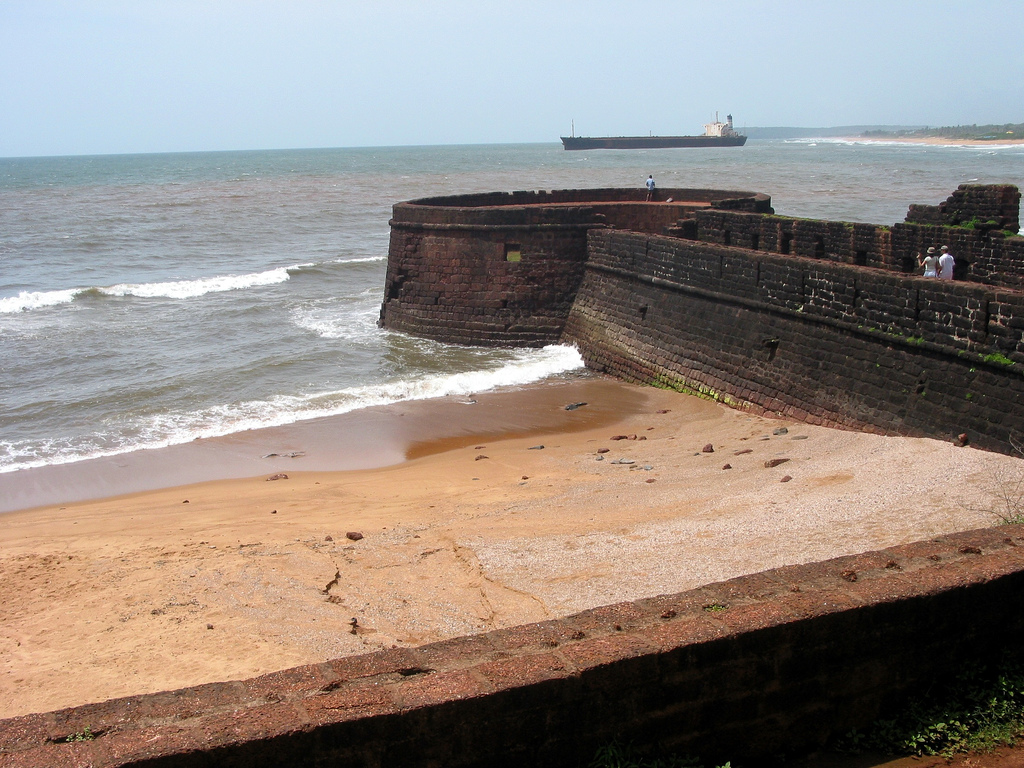
- Fort Aguada's ramparts overlook Sinquerim Beach and the Arabian Sea

- Location in Goa, India Fort Aguada (India)
- 15.488°N 73.763°E
- Location: Goa, India

History
- Built: 1612; 414 years ago

Fort Aguada is a seventeenth-century Portuguese-era fort, built in 1612, along with a lighthouse, standing in Goa, India, on Sinquerim Beach, overlooking the Arabian Sea. It is an ASI protected Monument of National Importance in Goa.

== Origins and history ==
Aguada fort was originally constructed in 1612 to guard against the Dutch. It was a reference point for the vessels coming from Europe at that time. This old Portuguese fort stands on the beach south of Candolim, at the shore of the Mandovi River. It was initially tasked with defense of shipping and the nearby Bardez sub-district.

A freshwater spring within the fort provided water supply to the ships that used to stop by. This is how the fort got its name: Aguada, meaning watery in the Portuguese language. Crews of passing ships would often visit to replenish their freshwater stores. The Aguada Fort Lighthouse erected in 1864 is the oldest of its kind in Asia. Built in 1612, it was once the grandstand of 79 cannons. It has the capacity of storing 2,376,000 gallons of water, one of the biggest freshwater storage of the time in whole of Asia. This fort is divided in two segments: the upper part acted as fort and watering station, while the lower part served as a safe berth for Portuguese ships. Whereas the upper part has a moat, underground water storage chamber, gunpowder room, lighthouse, and bastions, it also has a secret escape passage to use during time of war and emergency. The lighthouse at the initial stage used to emit light once in 7 minutes.

Fort Aguada was the most prized and crucial fort of Portuguese. The fort is so large that it envelops the entire peninsula at the southwestern tip of Bardez. Built on the mouth of Mandovi River, it was strategically located and was the chief defense of Portuguese against the Dutch.

During the Salazar Administration, Fort Aguada was repurposed for use as a prison primarily, some claim, for Salazar's political opponents.

== Aguada lighthouse ==
The Aguada lighthouse was built in 1864 on a hill located on the west to the fort. It is one of the oldest in Asia. It is located across the river from the peninsula encompassing Panaji and just south of Candolim beach. It was replaced by a new lighthouse in 1976 after serving for about a century. There was a large bell on the lighthouse which was found in the ruins of Saint Augustine monastery in Old Goa.It is an ideal place to visit.

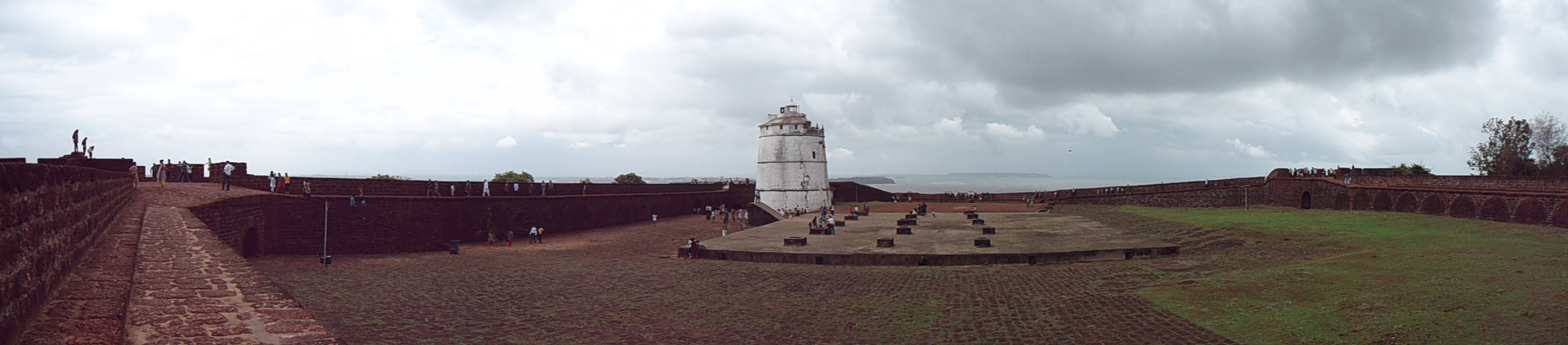
Panorama of Fort Aguada

== Aguada Central Jail ==
The jail is a part of the fort and was the largest prison in Goa until 2015. The 17th-century Portuguese-era structure has been renovated by the Goa Tourism Development Corporation along with the Goa Heritage Action Group and Goa's freedom fighters and opened for tourists as a Freedom Struggle Museum to showcase Goa's freedom struggle and be a true tribute to the heroic deeds and glorious sacrifices of all those who took part in Goa's Liberation and who fought against the Portuguese rule and British rule for the freedom of India and were jailed there. It was inaugurated on December 19, 2021 by PM Narendra Modi. The redevelopment cost approximately Rs 22 crore under the Centre's Swadesh Darshan Scheme. This museum has two particular cells dedicated to liberation fighters T B Cunha and Ram Manohar Lohia, where they were imprisoned under the Portuguese regime. This site also contains Portuguese cannons, and several monuments to Goa's anti-colonial struggle.

== Taj Fort Aguada Resort ==
Taj Fort Aguada Resort formerly Fort Aguada Beach Resort is part of Taj Hotel Group. The hotel opened in 1974 at the site of the historic Portuguese Fort Aguada.

== Gallery ==
Fort Aguada Pictures

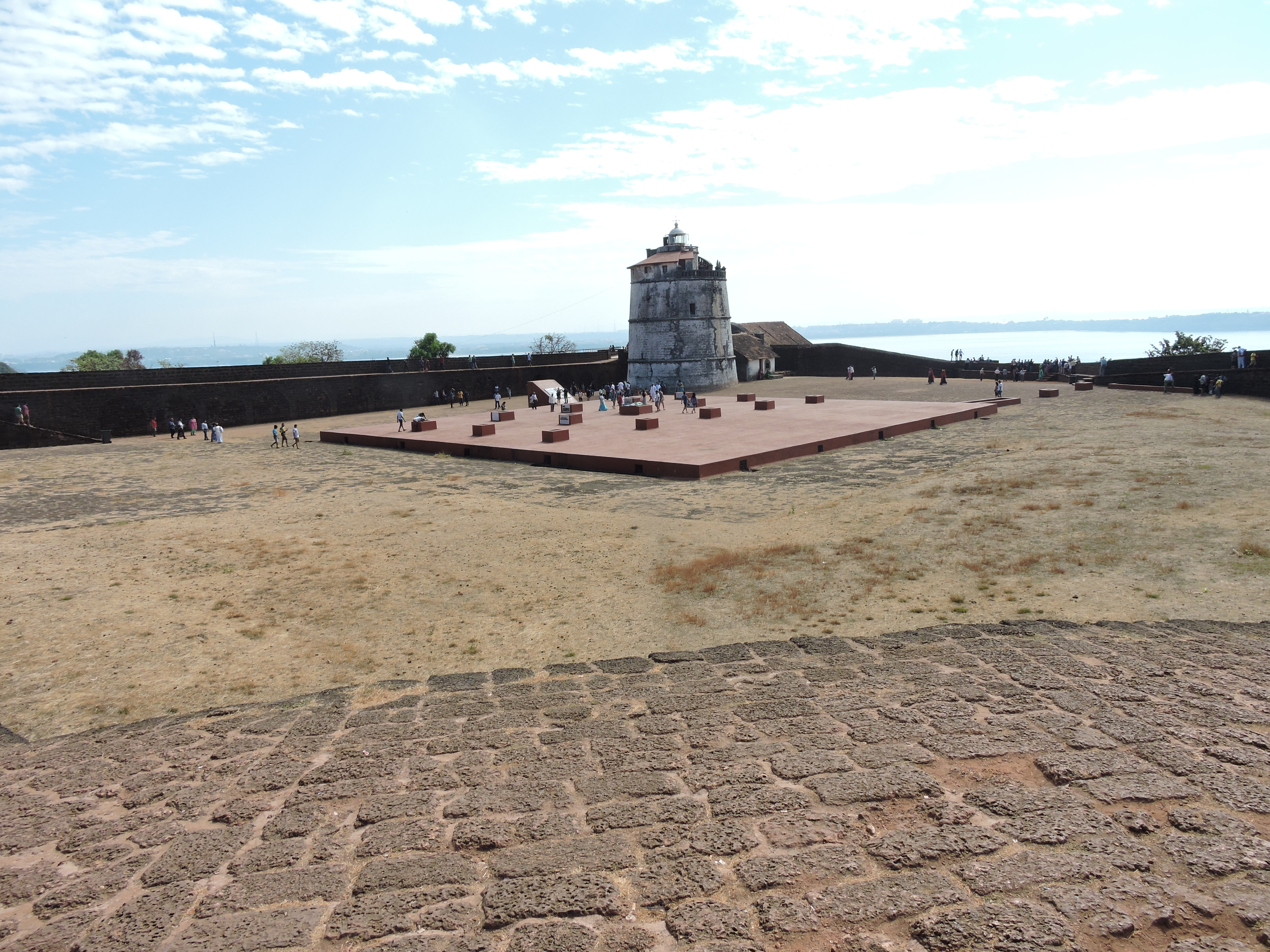

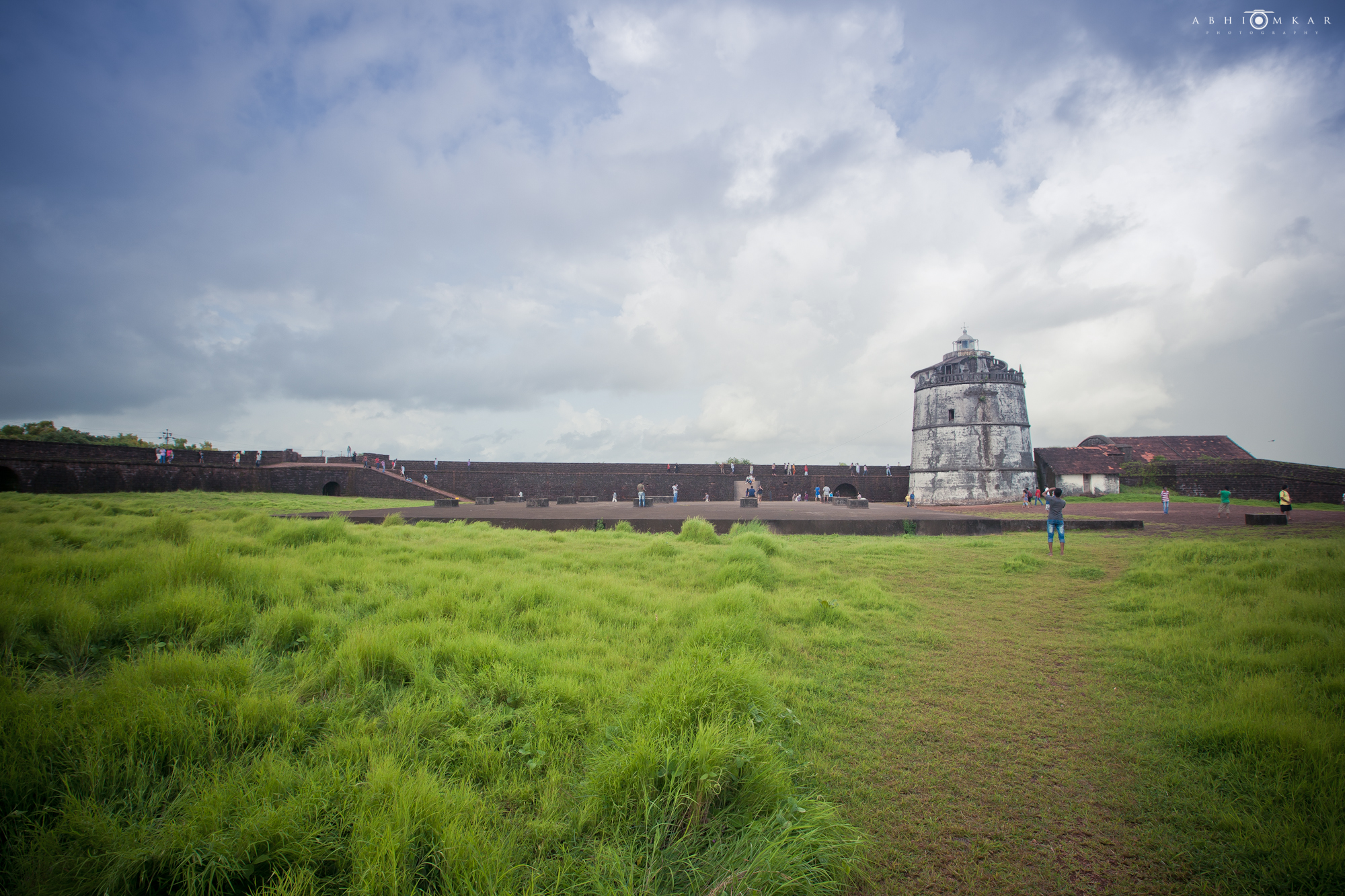

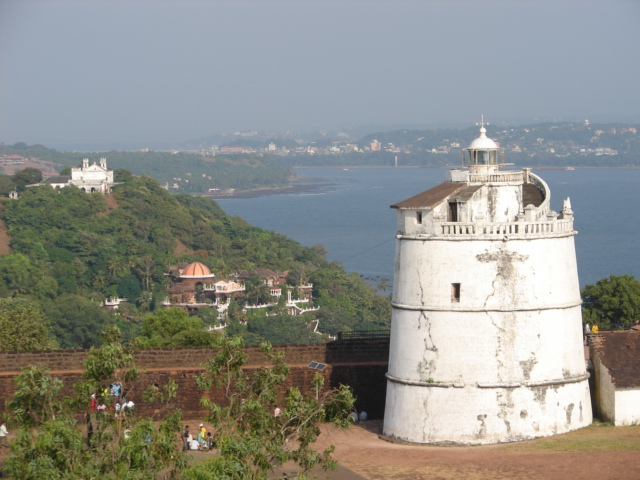
Fort Aguada lighthouse

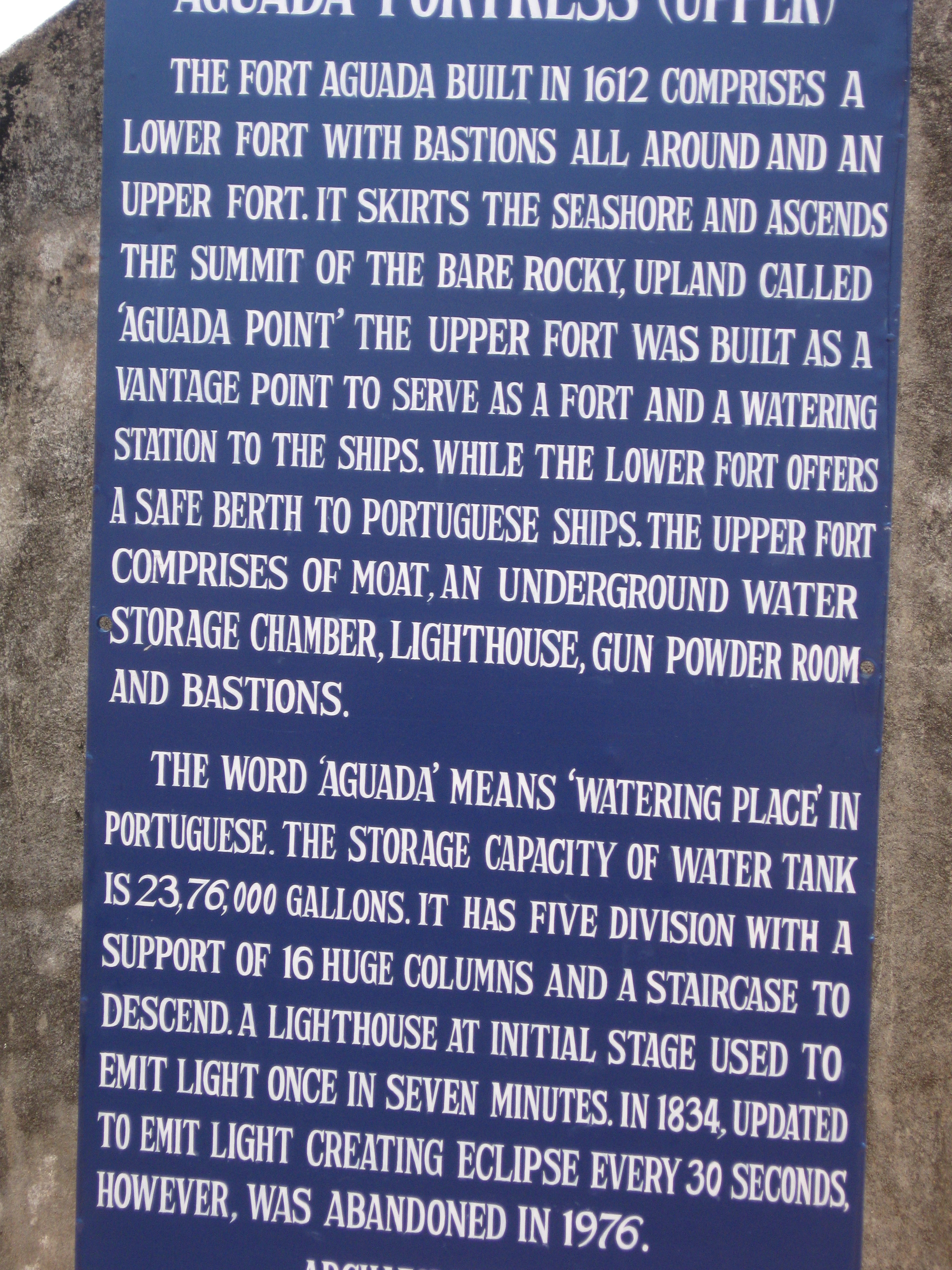
Information Plaque

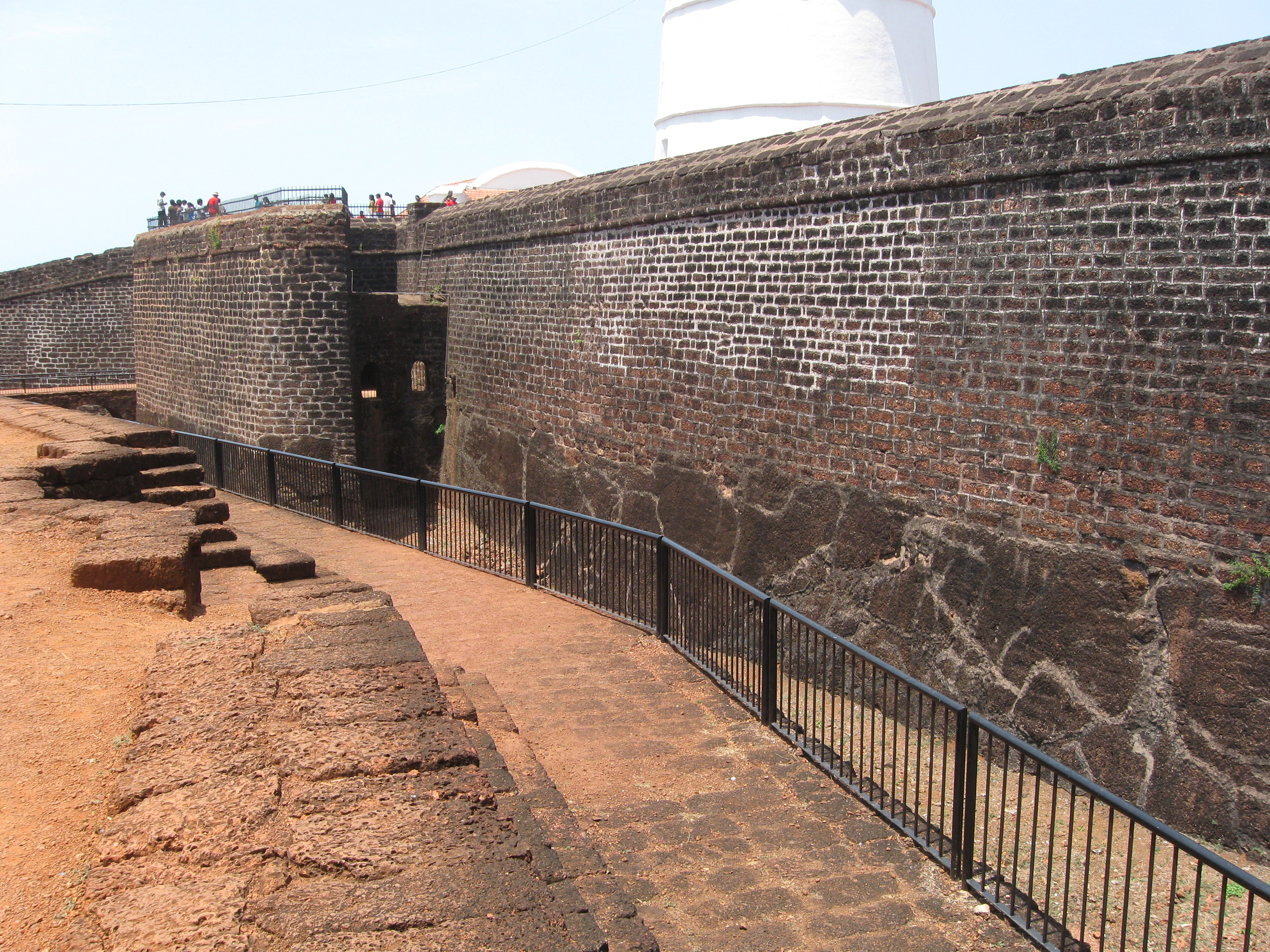

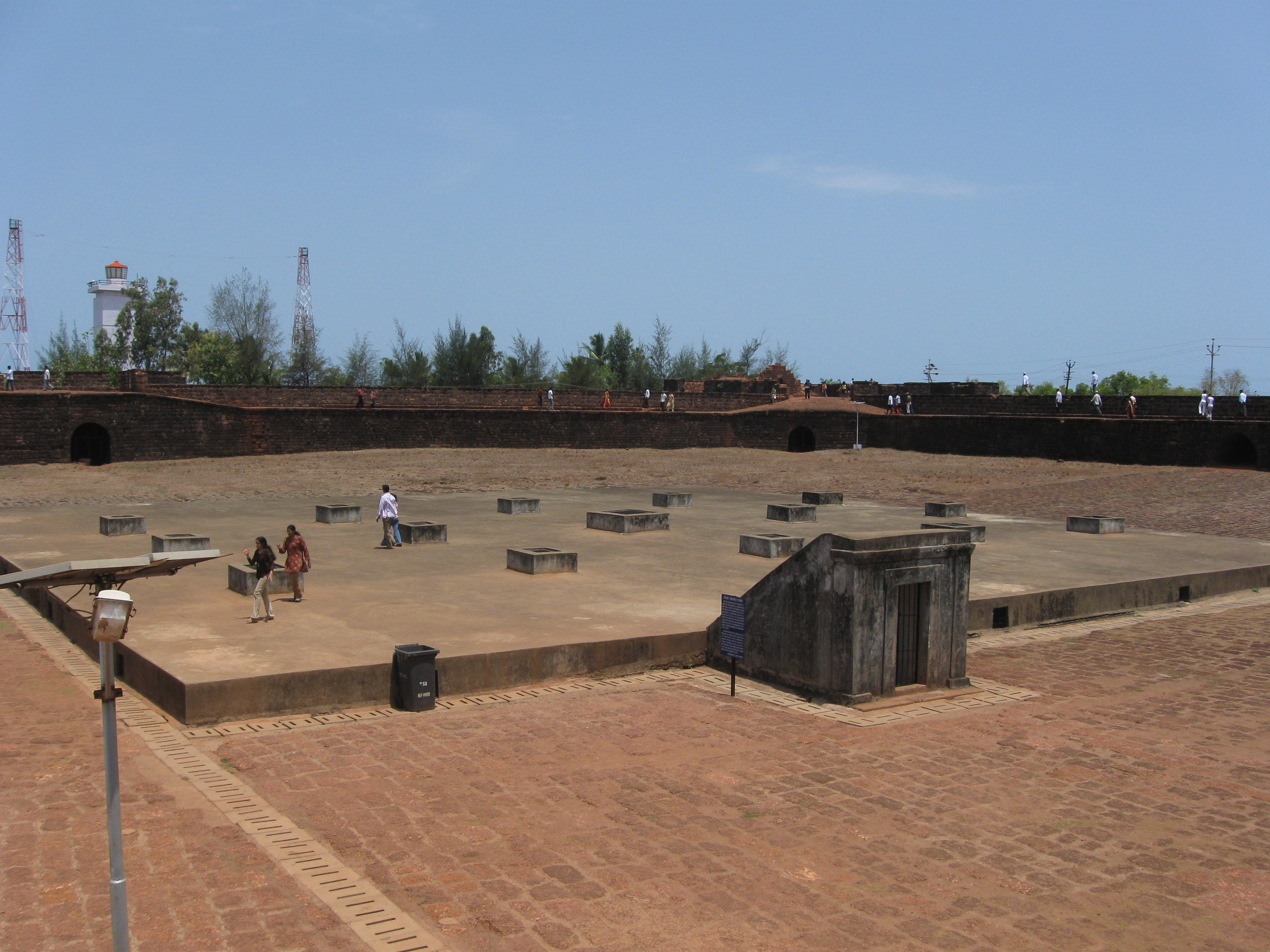

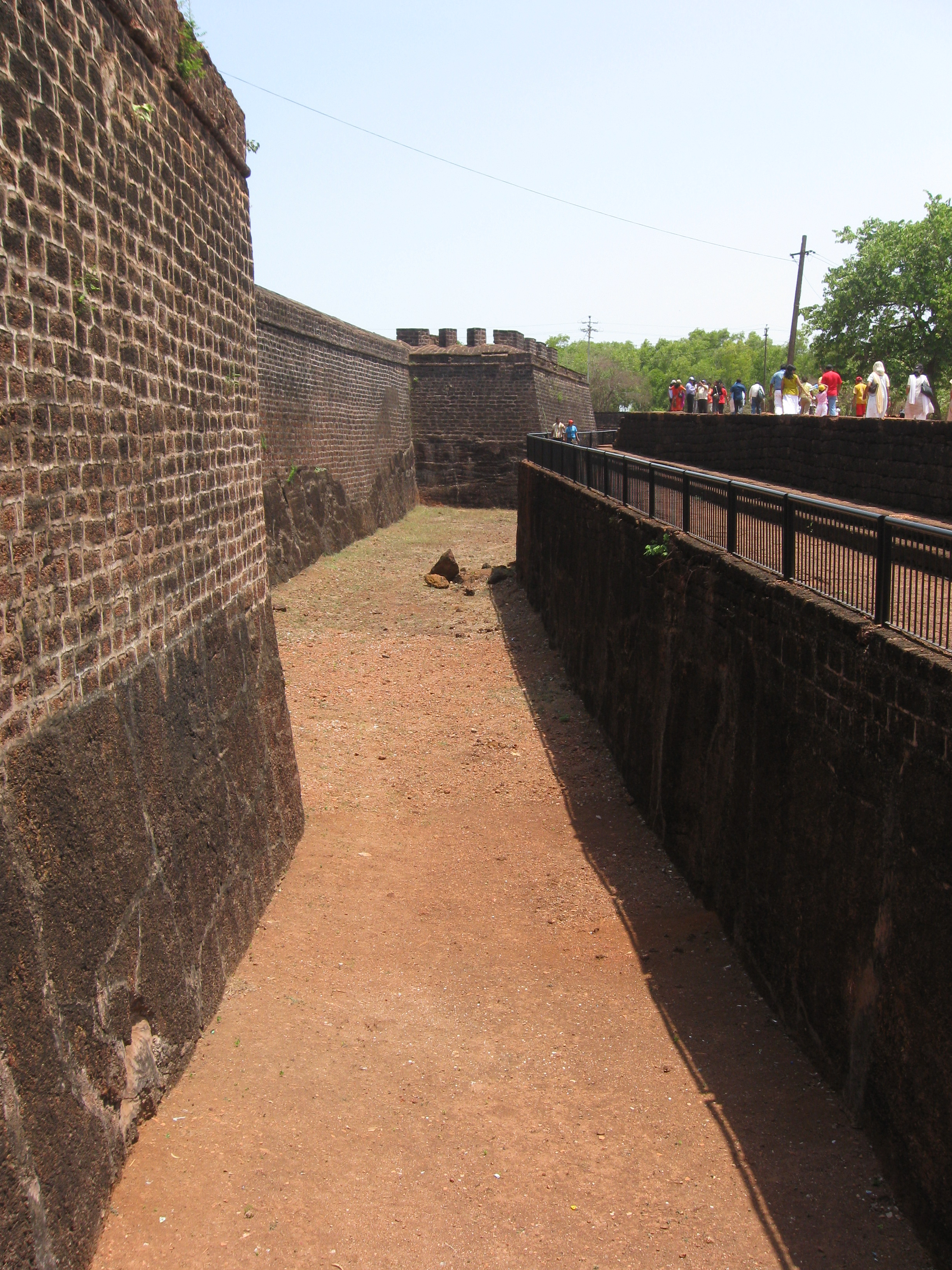

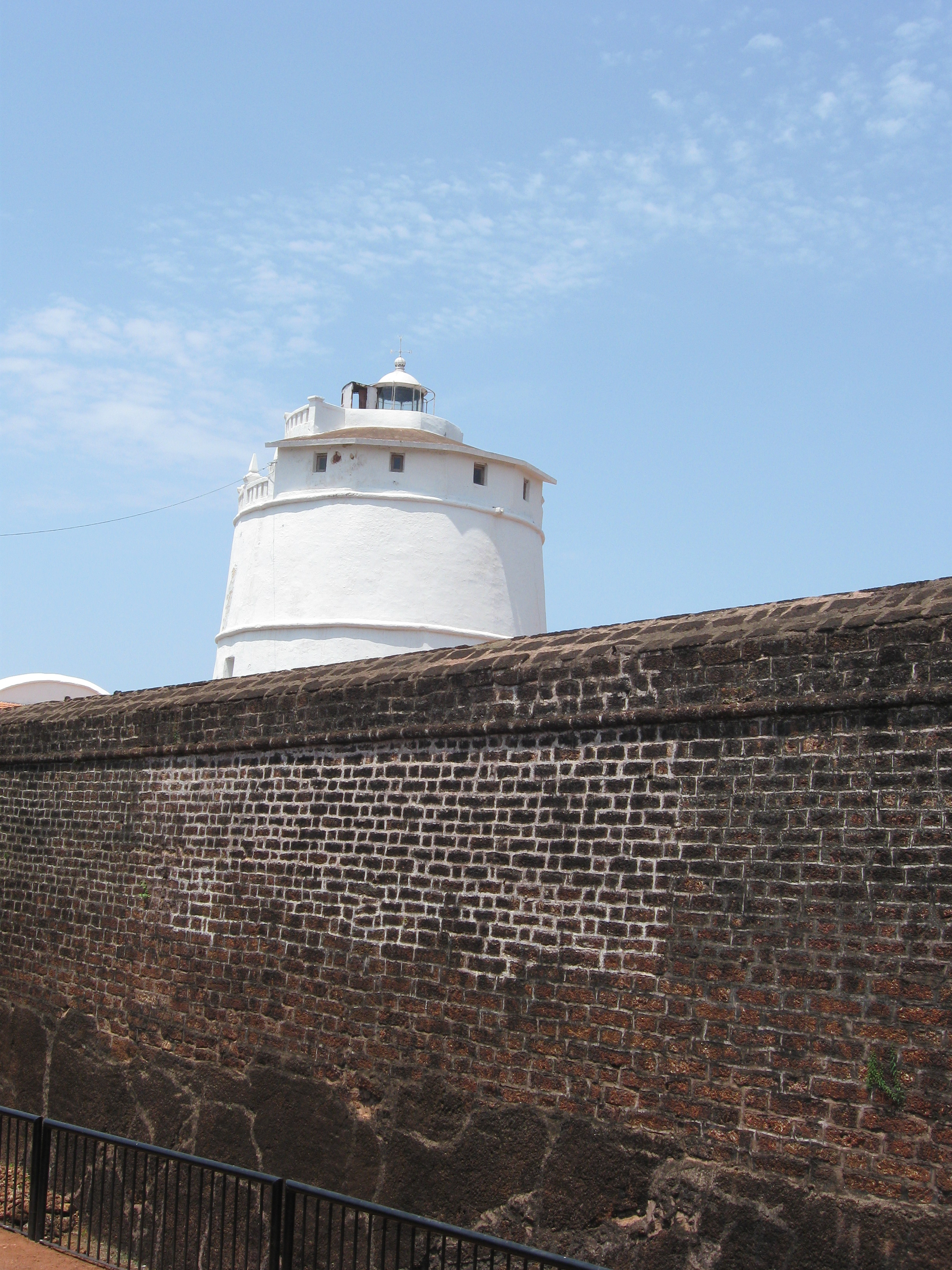

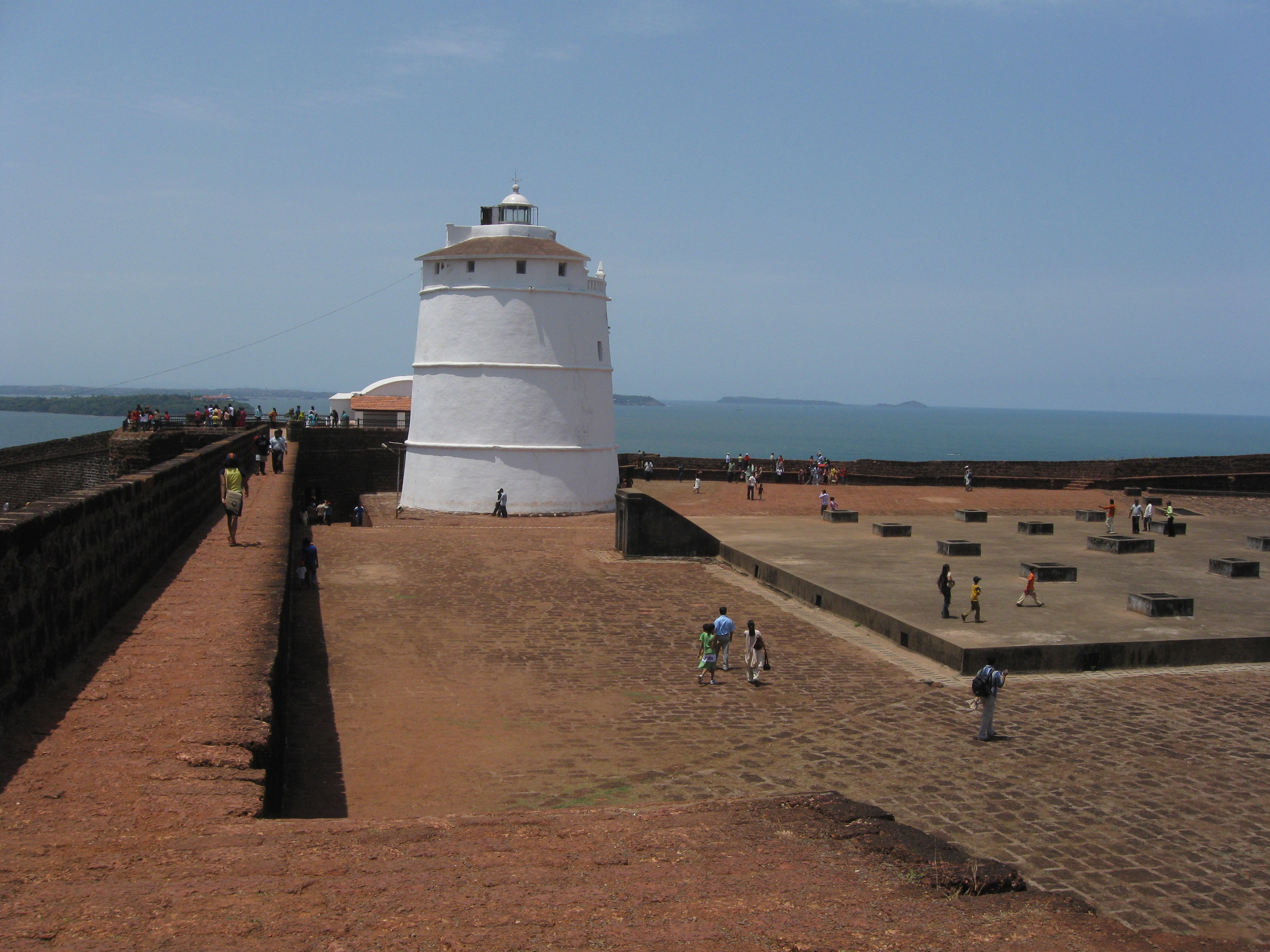

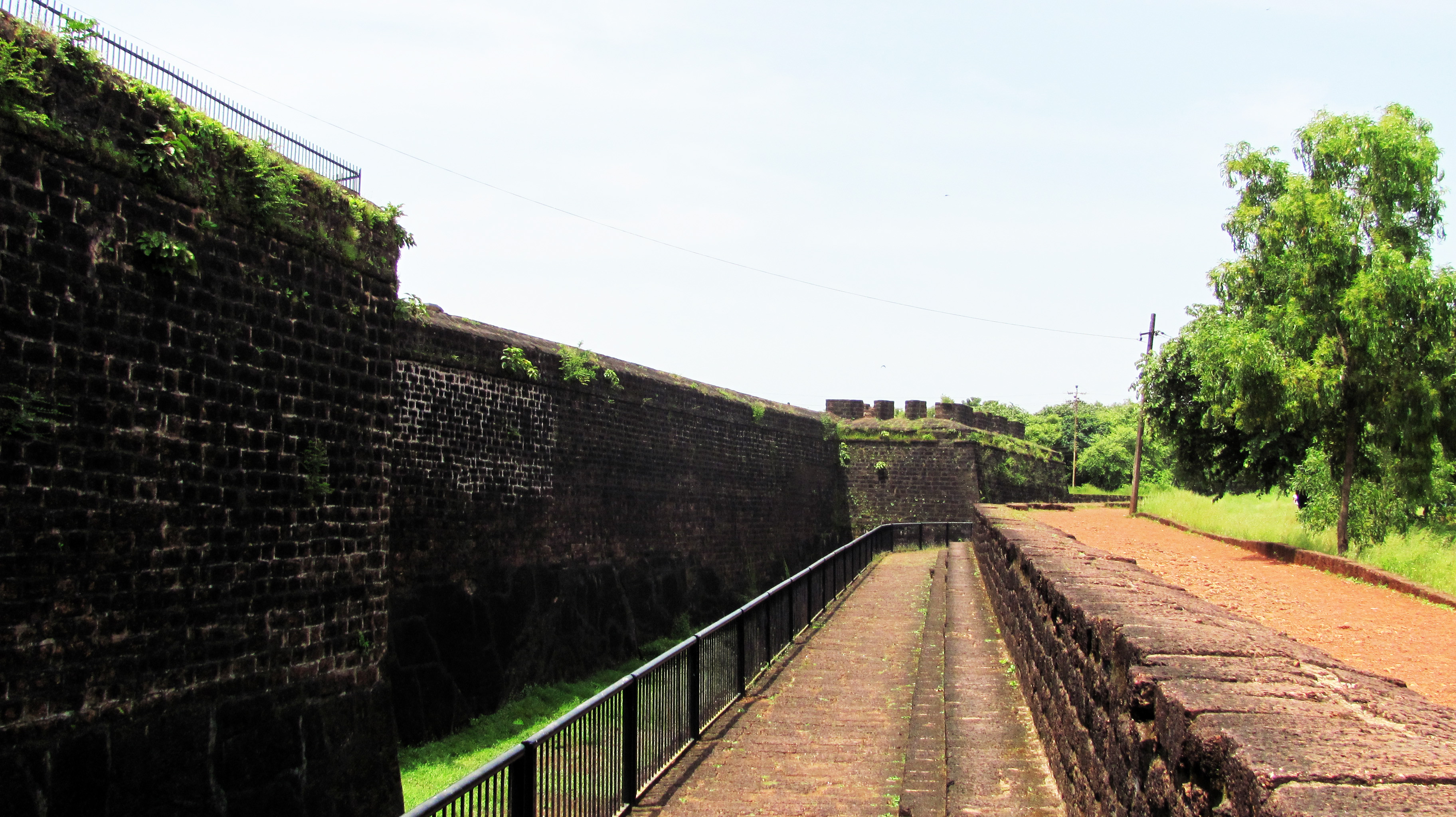
Fortification wall of Aguada Fortress (Lower)

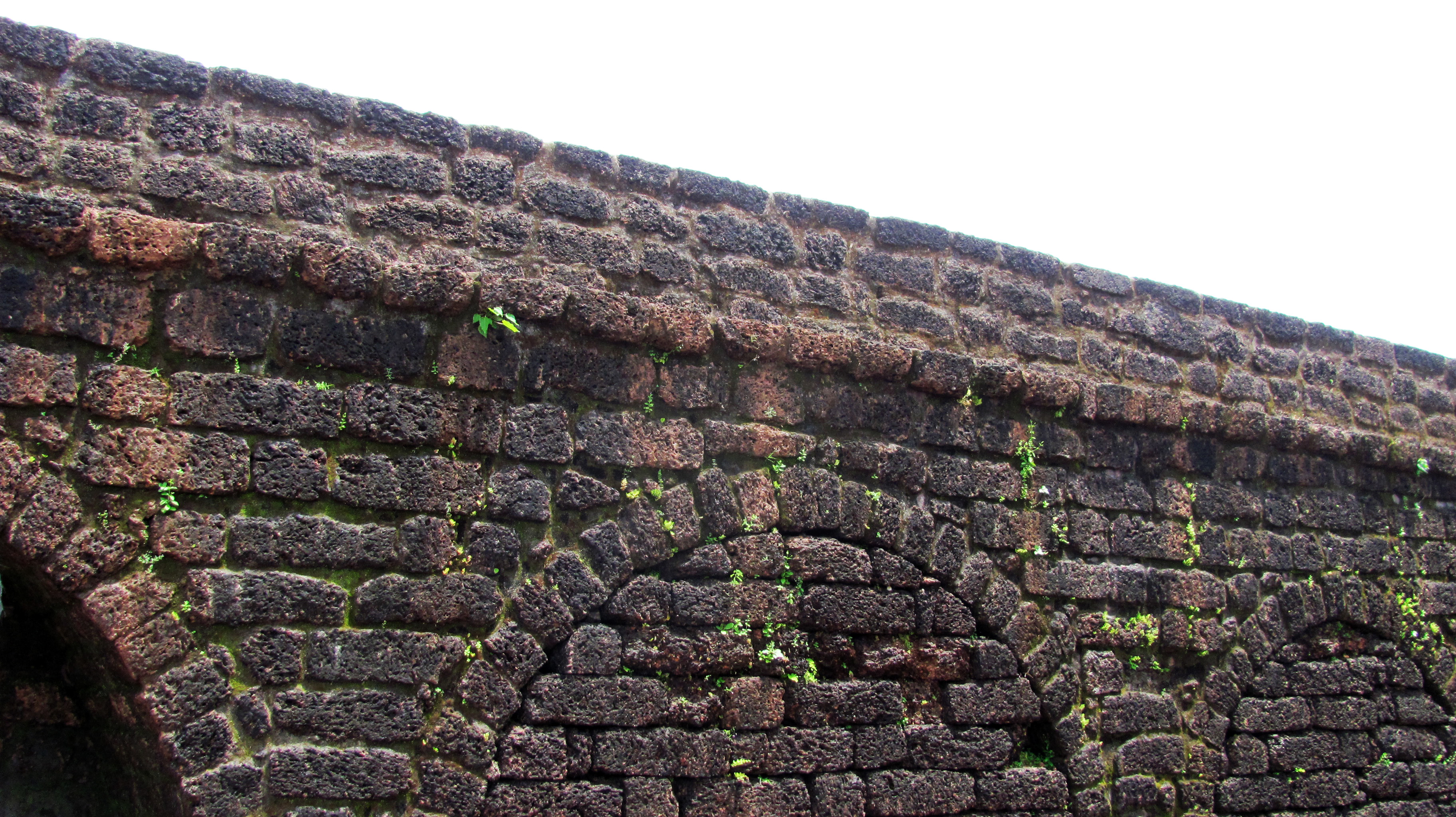
Fortification wall of Aguada Fortress (Lower)

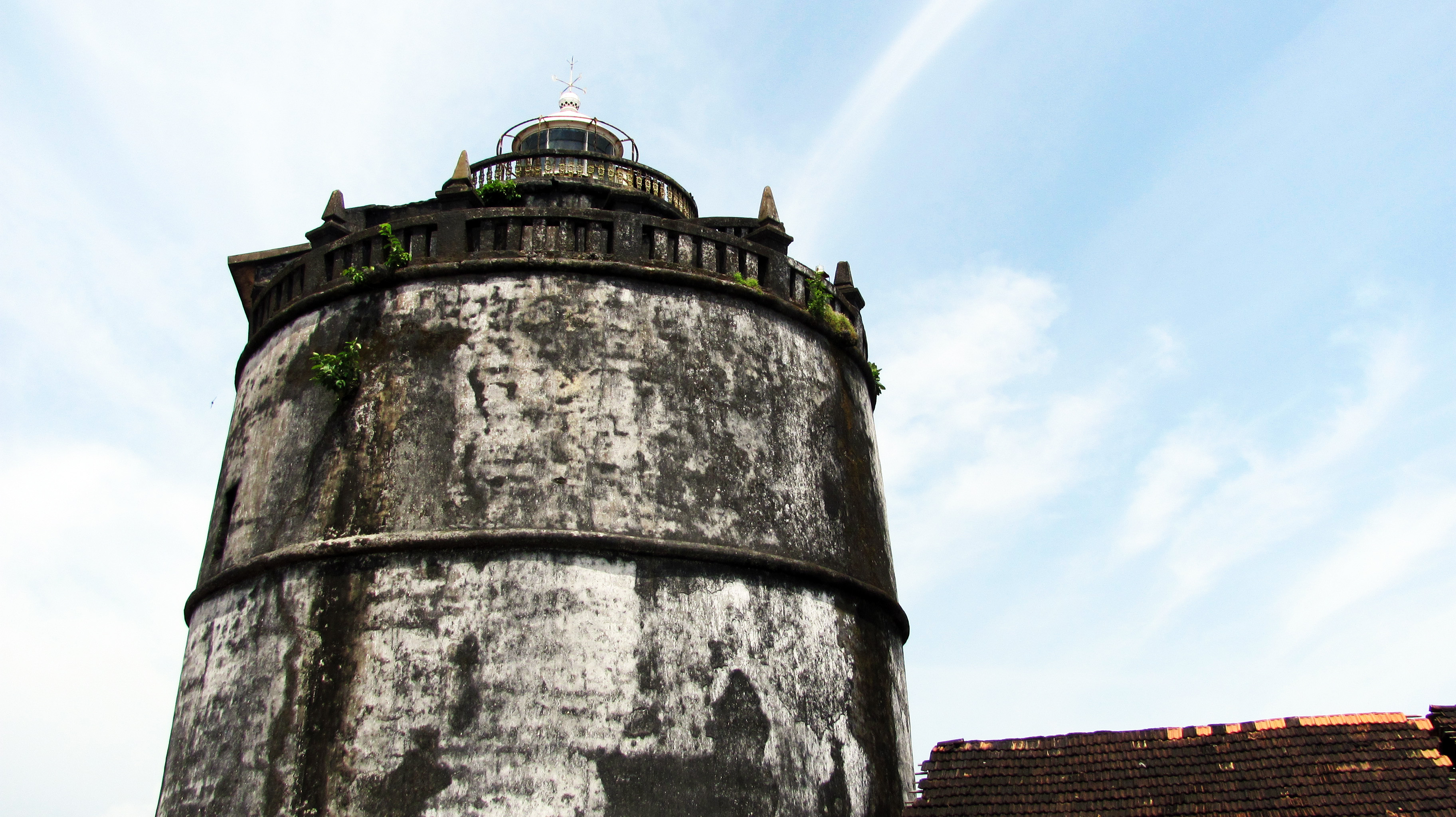
Aguada Fortress (Upper)

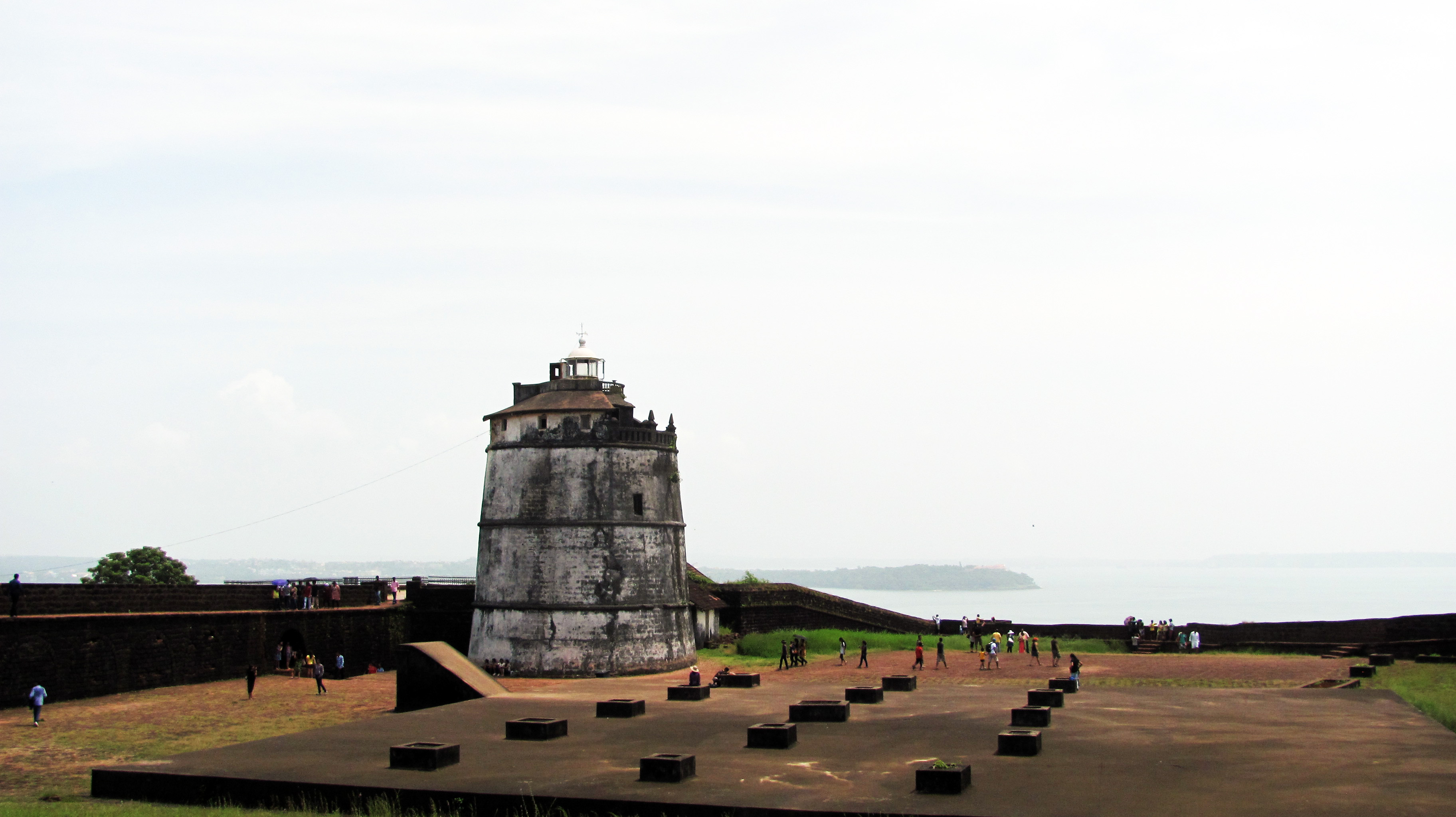
Aguada Fortress (Upper)

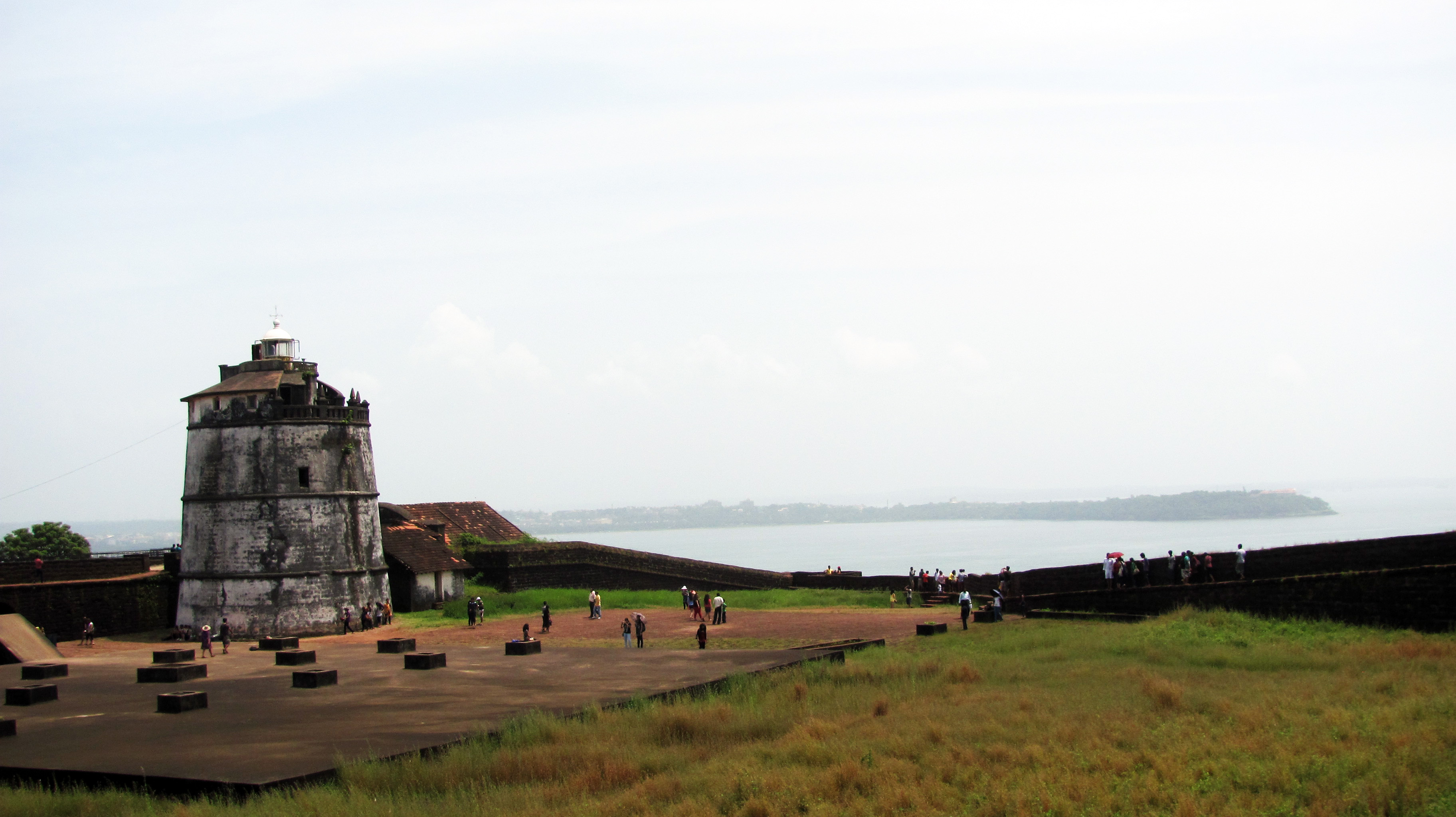
Aguada Fortress (Upper)

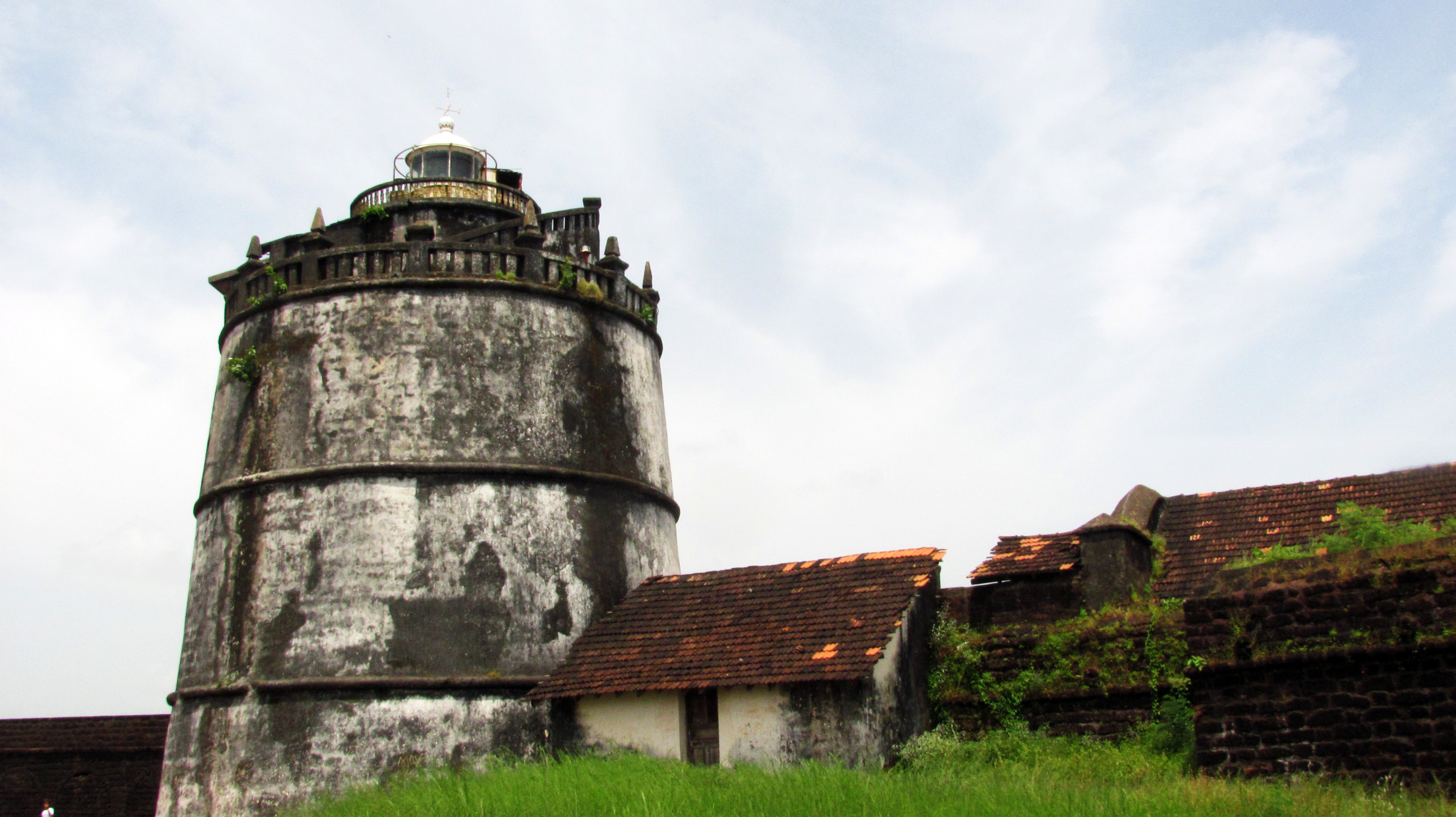
Aguada Fortress (Upper)

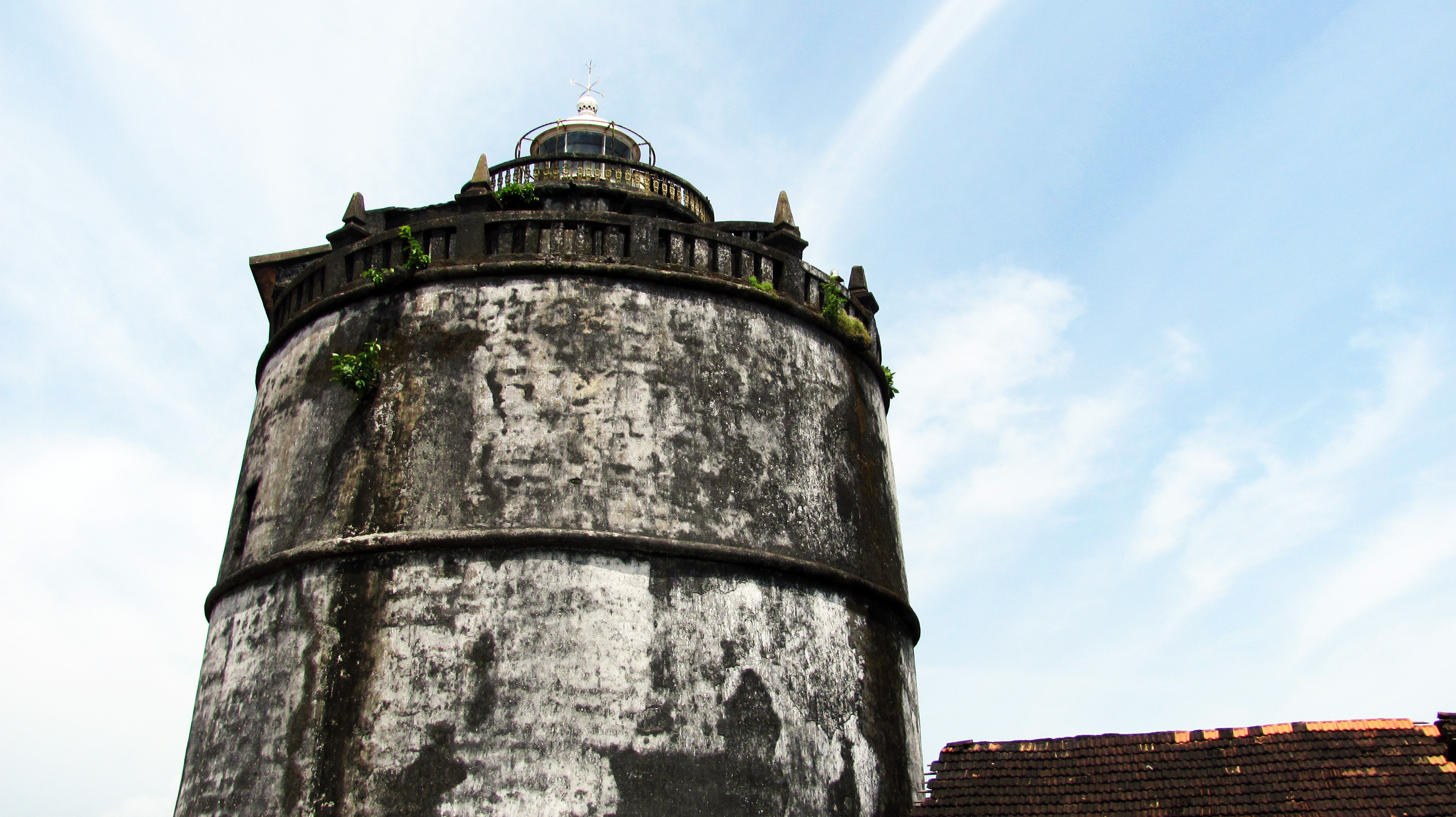
Aguada Fortress (Upper)

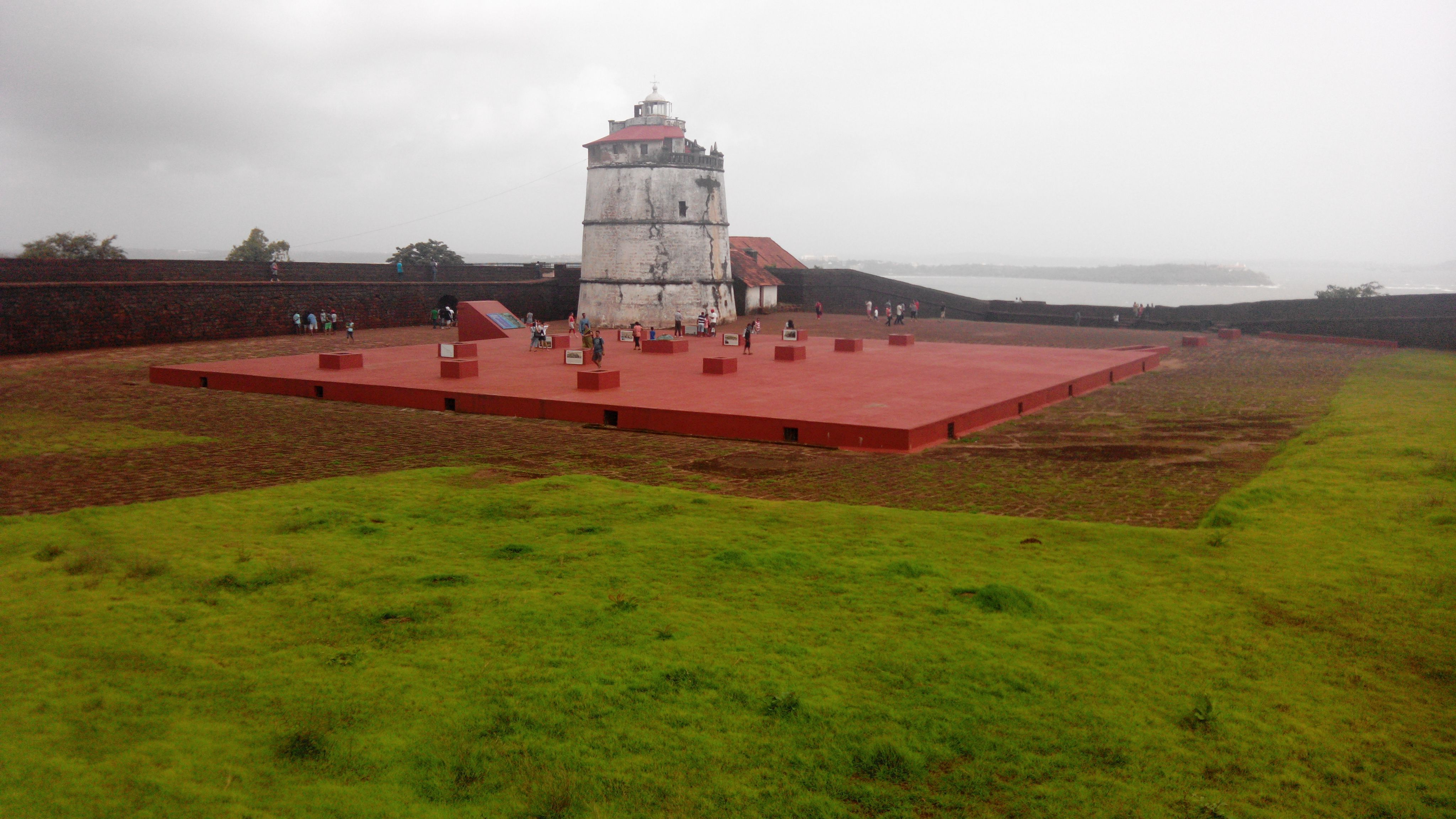
Agoda Goa RajakumarDhaamodharan

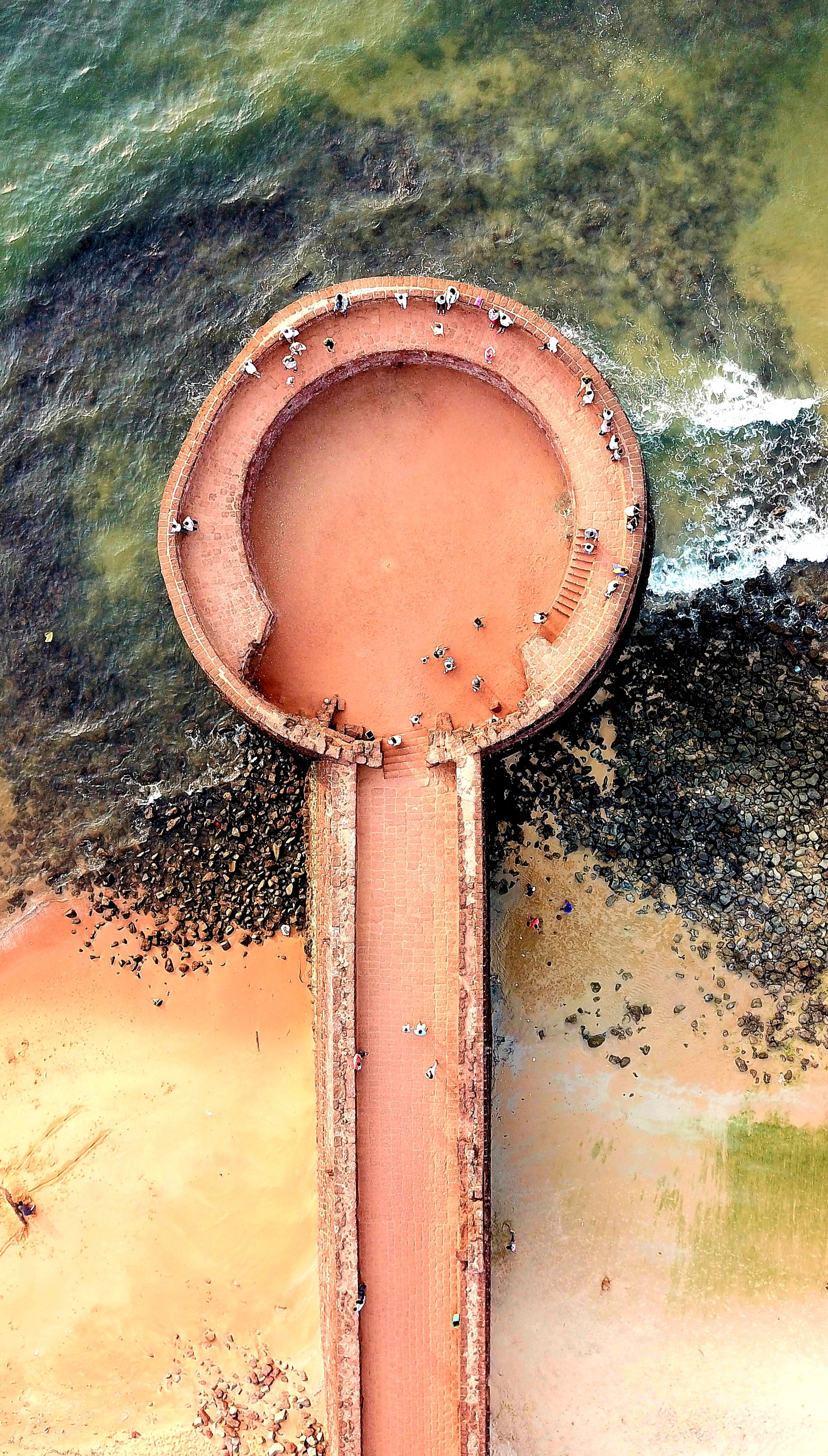
Part of Aguada Fort, Sinquerim Beach, Goa
