= Taj Fort Aguada Resort =

Resort in Goa, India

Coordinates: 15.4972787°N 73.7672184°E

Taj Fort Aguada Resort & Spa
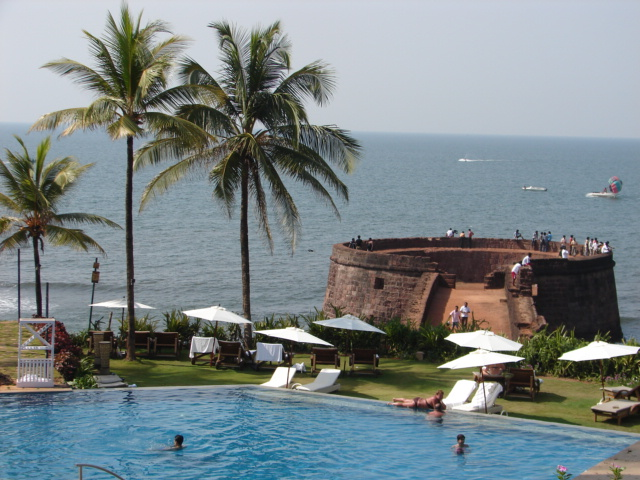
- Taj Fort Aguada Resort & Spa with Fort Aguada in the background
- Interactive map of the Taj Fort Aguada Resort & Spa area

General information
- Location: North Goa, India
- Operator: Taj Group of Hotels

Other information
- Number of rooms: 136 rooms & 4 suites

Website
- https://www.tajhotels.com/en-in/taj/taj-fort-aguada-goa/

Taj Fort Aguada Resort & Spa, formerly Fort Aguada Beach Resort, is built on the crescent of the beach at Sinquerim, in Goa, India. The hotel is part of the Taj Group of Hotels.

The Exotica is the "most plush" of the Taj group's four hotels in Goa. The 143-room property overlooks the beach and features amenities ranging from cricket grounds to an Ayurvedic spa. The hotel stands on a 56-acre beachfront property.

== History ==
The hotel opened in 1974 as the Taj Fort Aguada Beach Resort & Spa at the site of the historic Portuguese Fort Aguada. For many years, it was the sole first class hotel in Goa.

== Gallery ==
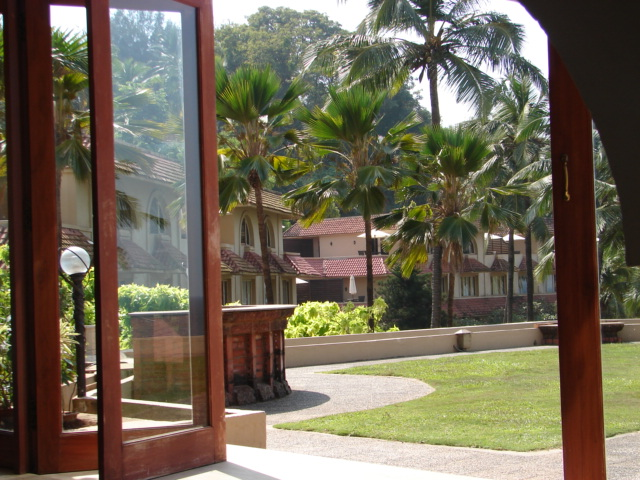
Inner view of resort

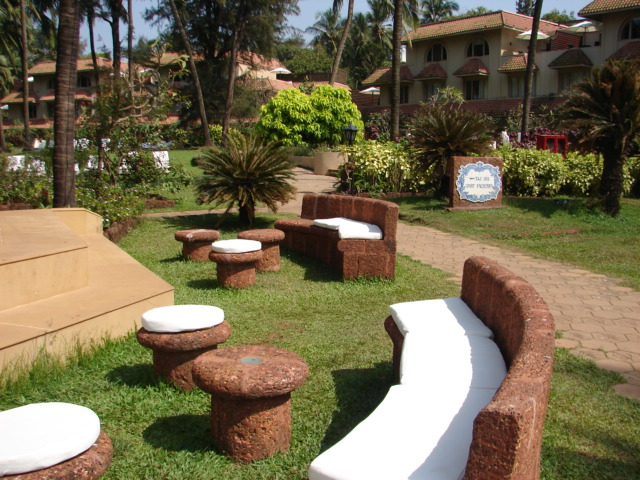
Taj Fort Resort

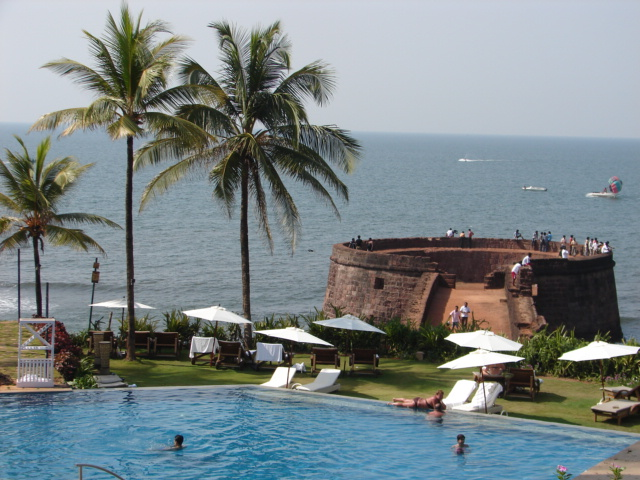
Aerial view

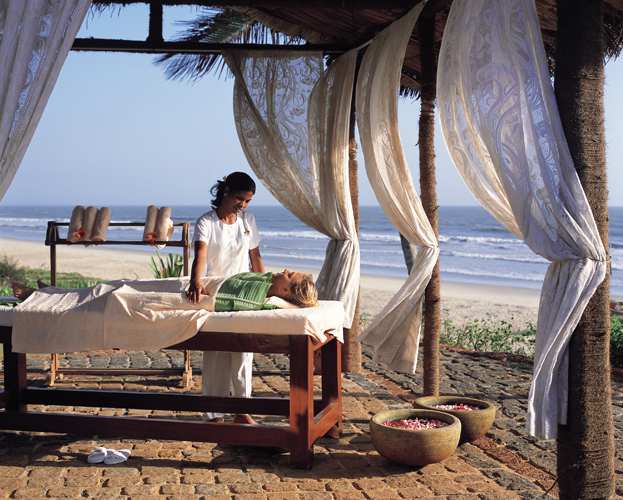
Taj Spa
