= Emma Slade =

British yoga instructor (born 1966)

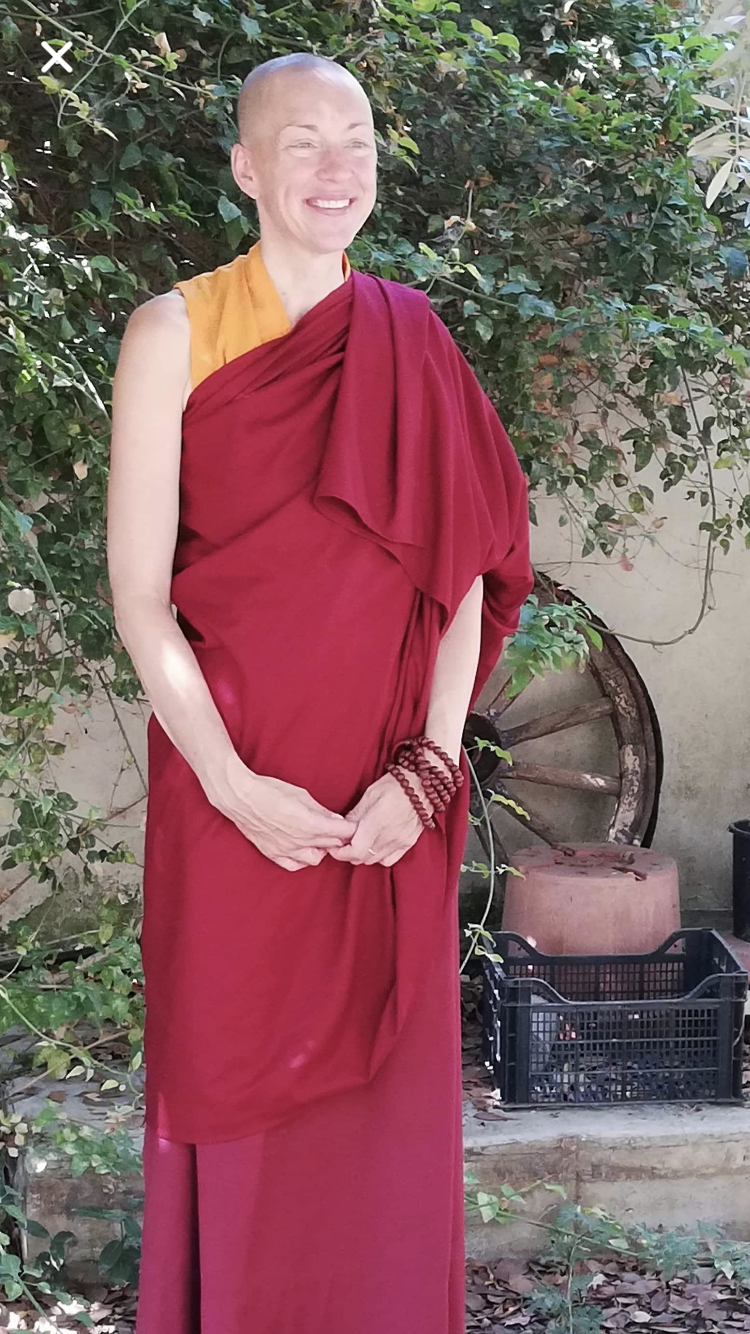
- Emma Slade in Bhutan
- Born: Emma Alexandra Slade; July 16, 1966 (age 60); Whitstable, Kent, UK
- Other name: Ani Pema Deki
- Education: Cambridge University; Goldsmiths, University of London
- Known for: First Western woman to become a Buddhist nun in Bhutan

Emma Slade, also known as Ani Pema Deki (born 16 July 1966), is a British yoga and meditation instructor, author, and charity founder best known for becoming the first Western woman to become a Buddhist nun in Bhutan. Slade was expanding her CFA certification when she was held at gunpoint and robbed while on a business trip in Jakarta. This experience inspired her to lean into the feeling of compassion and study Buddhism. Her autobiography, Set Free: A Life-Changing Journey from Banking to Buddhism in Bhutan, was published in 2017.

== Early life and education ==
Slade was born on 16 July 1966 in Whitstable, Kent, the eldest of three children, to David and Zinnia Slade (née Devan). She attended Joy Lane Primary School, Barton Court Grammar School, and Sevenoaks School. She earned eight O-levels; English, history, and geography at A-Level; and English and geography at S-level. Because of her scores, she was offered a place at Cambridge University to study English at Selwyn College. She started in 1985 and later changed from English to history. She left in the autumn term of her final year and visited her parents who had moved to Summit, New Jersey, USA. Slade returned to Cambridge and worked at an Iceland supermarket until being accepted to the Cambridge College of Arts and Technology for the Art foundation course. In 1993 she earned first class honours at Goldsmiths, University of London for a Fine Art degree. In her final year at Goldsmiths, her father was diagnosed with lung cancer; he died when she was 26. Though she had planned to become an artist or curator, she decided to go into investment banking so she could "make a living and not lean on mum."

== Career and robbery ==
Slade worked briefly at a retirement home in Whitstable, Kent, before applying to HSBC's Global Banking Graduate Programme. Slade enrolled in a Chartered Financial Analyst course run by AIMR and completed her first set of CFA exams in New York City in 1995 before returning to London. The following year, she went to Hong Kong to work in marketing while finishing her third level exams. She completed the programme in 1997 with the highest marks.

In September 1997, while on a business trip, Slade was held at gunpoint in her Jakarta hotel room. When the Jakarta police showed her a picture of her attacker bloodied and in his underwear, she was unexpectedly "overwhelmed with compassion for him, and for me, and for the whole situation," she told Time magazine. She finished her business trip accompanied by a bodyguard before returning to work in Hong Kong. Shortly after, she was diagnosed with severe post-traumatic stress disorder. She struggled with flashbacks and difficulty separating the past and present. She returned to England, where she joined an intensive two-week therapy programme in Ticehurst Priory's PTSD unit. Slade continued to work at HSBC in London after her discharge but had difficulty finding satisfaction in her career. The robbery, though traumatic, made her want to "explore more of what [she] could potentially do with [her] life." She left HSBC in 1998 but returned to work as a hedge fund analyst from 2005 to 2008.

== Buddhism ==
During the summer of 1998, Slade's mother paid for her to travel to the island of Skyros and take time for herself. She tried yoga for the first time, which inspired her to continue travelling to study with the best teachers and become a yoga teacher herself. Her teachers included Nancy Gilgoff in Hawaii, Tias Little in Santa Fe, New Mexico, Dena Ginsberg in Byron Bay, Australia, David Swenson in Costa Rica, and John Scott in Cornwall. She qualified in 2001 as a British Wheel of Yoga instructor and set up her studio, Whitstable Yoga, in her hometown. Slade visited the Kagyu Samye Ling Monastery and Tibetan Centre in Eskdalemuir in the Scottish Borders in July 2003 for a series of short retreats centered on meditation and Buddhist philosophy, particularly about compassion. The same year, she formally converted to Buddhism.

Slade visited Bhutan in 2011, where she met Nima Tshering, who she assumed was a monk, at the Druk Wangyal Lhakhang temple and Brent Hyde, the General Managed of the Zhiwa Ling Hotel in Paro. Hyde offered her a job as a yoga teacher at the hotel over Christmas and she accepted. When she returned, she learned that Nima Thsering was a Lama, not a monk, and that he had gone on retreat for three years. She later learned he was visiting his home village, and they met at the Zhiwa Ling Hotel on 31 December 2011. They started her tuition in Tibetan Buddhism the following day, then over the phone when she returned to England. The Lama encouraged her to begin dressing in monastic robes to complement her already-shaved head. The following year, she received the name Ani Pema Deki, meaning Nun Lotus Blissful, at a naming ceremony conducted by Rinpoche Gyalsey Tenzin Radgye, Lama Nima Tshering's teacher. Despite this, she worried she was unable to become a Buddhist nun, called a Bhikkhunī, since she was raising her son in England and was unable to attend the required retreats. With the encouragement of the Lama, she rearranged her life in Whitstable to accommodate the retreats. She returned to Bhutan in February 2014 with her seven-year-old son and was ordained as the first Western woman to be ordained as a Bhikkhunī in the country. As of 2018, she was still the only Western woman to hold this title.

In 2015, Slade founded Opening Your Heart to Bhutan, an organisation benefiting Bhutanese children. It became an official British charity the following year. Their first project included installing cold showers and toilets in the local monastery and improving education facilities in the rural village of Meritsemo, in Chukha. Opening Your Heart focuses on providing access to and training to ensure safe healthcare and education, disability aids and educational projects. The proceeds from Slade's autobiography entirely benefit the charity. She was invited to a reception hosted by the King and Queen of Bhutan at the Taj Tashi Hotel in Thimphu in April 2016, where she met the Duke and Duchess of Cambridge.

As a public speaker, Slade has given talks internationally, including at the Foreign Correspondents' Club in Hong Kong, a TEDx Talk in 2017, and at the Oxford Human Rights Festival in 2018. She was the subject of a short film called Happiness by the Dalai Lama Centre for Compassion in Oxford. She was awarded the Points of Light Award from the British Prime Minister in 2017 for her service in Bhutan and was shortlisted for the Asian Voice Charity Award for "Most Inspiring Individual in Charity" in 2018.

== Personal life ==
Slade was in a long-term relationship with an English sculptor that ended in 2005, when she was informed she was unable to have children. She moved back to London to continue in the banking sector and had a brief relationship with another CFA, after which she found she was pregnant. Their son Oscar was born in September 2006. As of 2018, Slade lives in Whitstable, where she teaches yoga and meditation and manages her charity. She travels regularly to Bhutan.
