= Taj Malabar Resort & Spa =

Luxury heritage hotel in Kochi, India

Taj Malabar Resort & Spa, Cochin
- Interactive map of the Taj Malabar Resort & Spa, Cochin area
- Hotel chain: Taj Hotels

General information
- Location: Willingdon Island, Kochi, Kerala, India
- Coordinates: 9.9688°N 76.2581°E
- Opening: 1935; 91 years ago (as the Willingdon Island Hotel)
- Operator: Taj Hotels

Other information
- Number of rooms: 93
- Number of suites: 11

The Taj Malabar Resort & Spa, Cochin is a heritage, five-star, luxury hotel in the city of Kochi, Kerala, India. Situated in Willingdon Island, it was originally opened by the Madras Government in 1935 as a hostel. Considered as a heritage landmark of the city, it is also one of the oldest hotels in Kochi and has been historically known as the The Malabar Hotel. The property was acquired by Indian Hotels Company Limited (IHCL) in 1984 after which they expanded into a five-star hotel. The property is part of the chain hotels of Taj Group of Hotels.

== History ==
The hotel's origins is traced back to 1930s during the expansion of Cochin Harbour. With the increase of maritime passenger traffic, in 1934, the Madras Government approved the construction of a government run hostel on Willingdon Island to provide accommodation for travellers. According to historian M. K. Das, the hostel was completed in approximately four and a half months at a cost of ₹2 lakh.

The hostel was inaugurated on 8 March 1935. It was initially managed by Spencer's & Co. On the following day, passenger vessel SS Shropshire operated by Bibby Line became the first ship to berth at Cochin Harbour after the hostel had opened. The property at that time was known as the Willingdon Island Hotel. It was later renamed as Malabar Hotel.

It was originally constructed in an L-shaped layout and featured amenities such as polished teakwood flooring, a swimming pool and banquet facilities. An additional wing was added in later years, resulting in the building's U-shaped plan. Management of the hotel was subsequently transferred from Spencer's & Co. to D. C. Johar & Co.

In 1984, The Indian Hotels Company Limited (IHCL) acquired the property. At the time of the acquisition, it consisted of the 33-room heritage wing. After restoration work, the heritage wing was reopened on 14 April 1987. IHCL later expanded the property with the addition of the 63-room tower wing, increasing the hotel's accommodation capacity.

The hotel underwent a major renovation in 2023 and was reopened in 2024 with new amenities while maintaining the old heritage wing's architectural style.

== See also ==
- Taj Hotels
- Willingdon Island
- Brunton Boatyard
