= Brunton Boatyard =

Luxury heritage hotel in Kochi, India

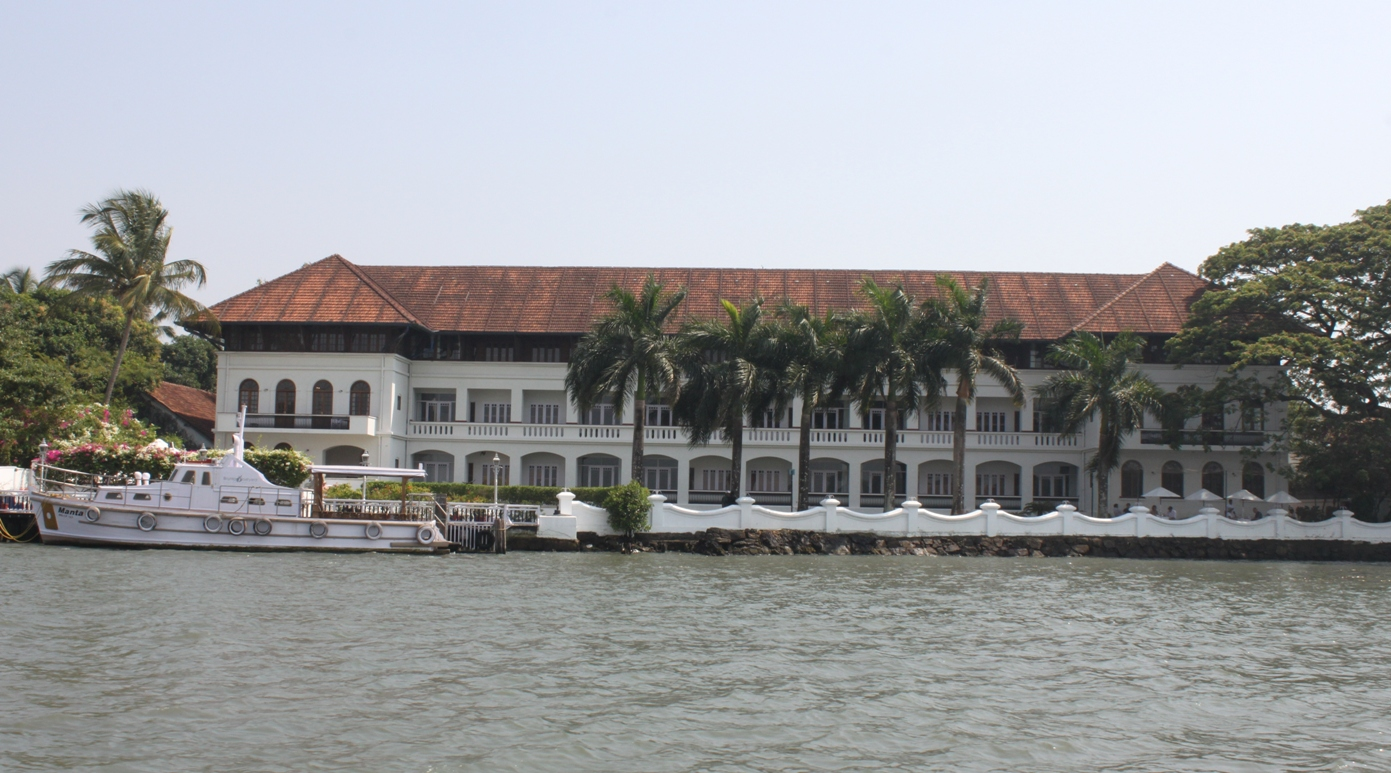
- Brunton Boatyard Hotel

General information
- Type: Hotel
- Location: Fort Kochi, India
- Opened: 1895 (originally as boatyard), (1999 as heritage hotel)
- Owner: CGH Earth

Brunton Boatyard was a former shipyard, which is now a luxury heritage hotel operated by CGH Earth. Located at the edge of the port in Fort Kochi, in the state of Kerala, India, the yard was established in 1895 by Geo Brunton & Sons. Before ceasing its operation in twentieth century, it was one of the important British shipbuilding facilities in Kochi. Decades later, in 1999, the site was restored and transformed into a heritage hotel by CGH Earth.

== History ==
Brunton Boatyard was established around 1895 in Fort Kochi by George Brunton &Sons. According to historians, the yard reached its peak during the mid-twentieth century. The ships constructed were reportedly used by the British during the Second World War. The property was abandoned for several decades following its decline. In 1992, CGH Earth leased the property from the Cochin Port Trust and redeveloped the site into a luxury heritage hotel. It was opened in August 1999. The last boat ever built by the Bruntons, the Manta, was bought by the hotel in an auction and sat docked near the pool.

== See also ==
- Bolgatty Palace
- Taj Malabar Resort & Spa
