= Taj Coromandel =

Luxury hotel in Chennai, India

- Hotel chain: Taj Hotels

General information
- Location: Chennai, India, 37, Nungambakkam High Road, Nungambakkam; Chennai, Tamil Nadu 600 034
- Coordinates: 13.058292°N 80.247633°E
- Opening: 14 April 1974
- Owner: Oriental Hotels
- Operator: Taj Hotels

Technical details
- Floor count: 7

Other information
- Number of rooms: 212
- Number of suites: 11

Website
- Taj Coromandel

Taj Coromandel is a five-star luxury hotel located in Chennai, India. Named after the Coromandel Coast, the HACCP- and ISO 14001-certified hotel was opened in 1974. Owned by Oriental Hotels Limited, an associate of the Taj Group of Hotels, it is classified under the group's luxury hotels section.

Taj Coromandel was the first and only luxury hotel in the city for almost three decades.

== Location ==
The hotel is located at 37, Mahatma Gandhi Road, abutting Brakathambal Street in Nungambakkam.

== History ==
The hotel was named after the Coromandel Coast on which the city of Chennai is situated. The name is also derived from the Coromandel tree (Kalpavriksha in Sanskrit), which, according to legend, has the power to grant any wish to a person who is under its shade. This, having a metaphorical reference to any guest who visits the hotel being granted anything that he or she wished for during the stay, is also cited as a reason for naming so. To signify this, the tree has been engraved into the marble façade of the hotel.

In 1996, Southern Spice restaurant was launched.

== Facilities ==
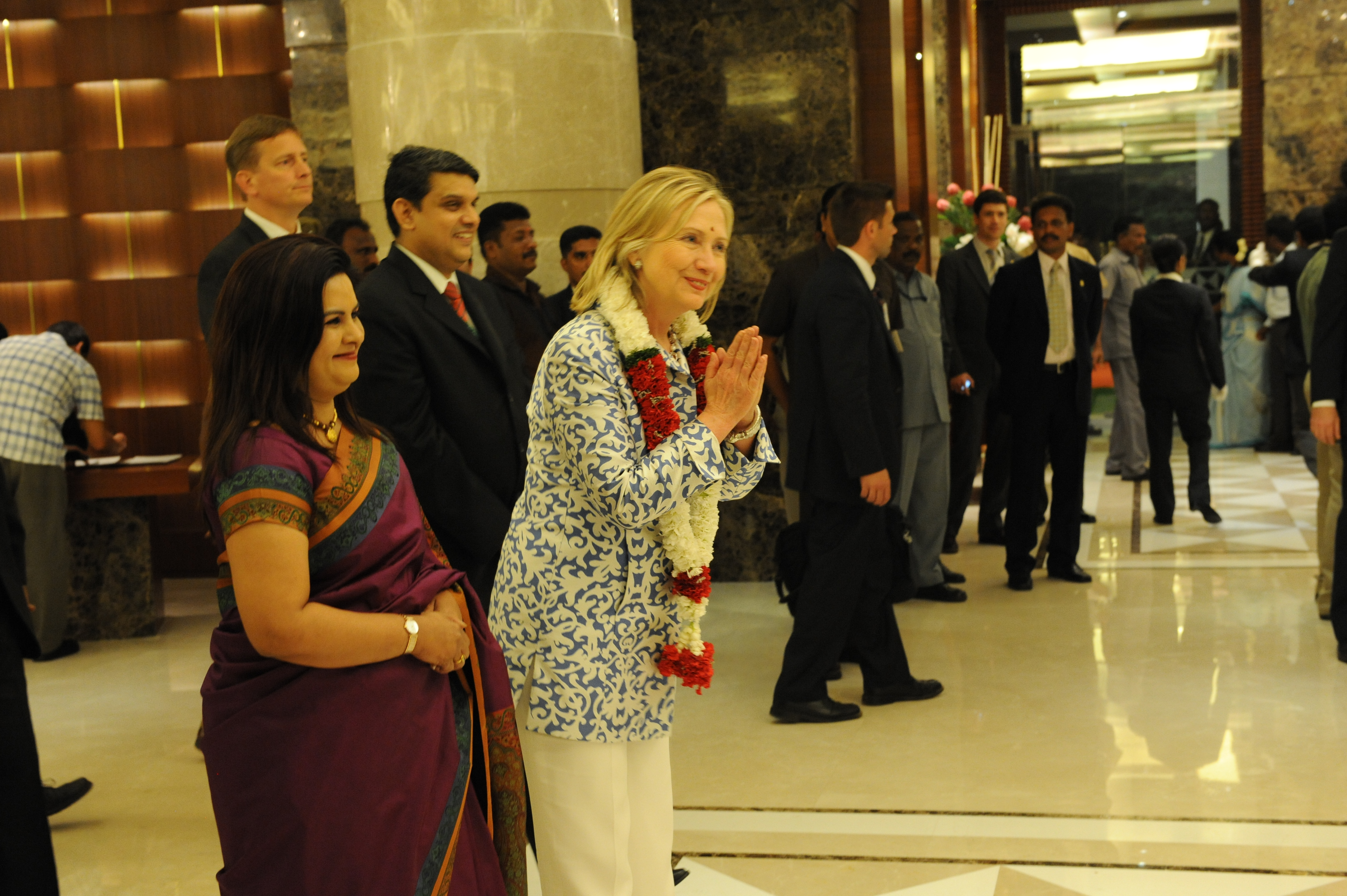
U.S. Secretary of State Hillary Clinton is greeted by employees at the Taj Coromandel with a traditional greeting during her visit to India on 20 July 2011.

Taj Coromandel has a total of 212 rooms, including 11 suites. The Superior Rooms are 300 sq ft in size. The Taj Club Rooms are located on the top two floors. The Royal Suite is located on the top floor, which includes a living room, two bathrooms and a private terrace sit-out providing the views of the city. It also has a Jacuzzi, additional guest bathroom, a separate dining area, a dressing room with 3-way mirrors and a pantry spread over 1,500 sq ft, and a private valet. The suite's occupant is entitled to all of the Taj Club facilities and services.

The restaurants at the hotel include Anise—a 24-hour coffee shop and also a Multi-cuisine Restaurant, Chipstead—a lounge bar, Tea Lounge—serving a selection of a variety of teas from around the world, Golden Dragon—a specialty in Sichuan and Cantonese restaurant, Southern Spice—serving cuisine from the four southern states of India, and The Prego—a restaurant serving Italian cuisine.

The hotel has 12,000 sq ft of business and reception facilities in eight conference rooms, ball rooms and board rooms. The Clive has a capacity of 30 seats. The hotel also has a lagoon-style 5-metre lap lane pool.

== Renovation ==
After its first renovation in the late 1980s and early 1990s since its inception, the hotel was renovated for the second time in 2011 at a cost of about ₹ 1,000 million. Design firm Belt Collins designed a new driveway with new landscaping, and Chandu Chadda from Hong Kong redesigned the cavernous lobby. Belt Collins has designed a 9,000 sq ft spa under Taj's Jiva brand adjacent to its pool, and the hotel is also in the process of building a 6,000 sq ft gym. The Southern Spice restaurant was renovated in 2011–2012 with interior designing by Ed Poole of Singapore-based Poole Associates.

In 2013, the hotel relaunched Ballroom, a 13,000-sq-feet banqueting facility.

== Notable residents ==
Some of the notable guests who have stayed at Taj Coromandel include Queen Elizabeth II, Jimmy Carter, the Duke of York, Italian Prime Minister Romano Prodi, Bill Clinton, Festus Gontebanye Mogae, Maud Olofsson, Jackie Chan, Sergei Stanishev, Jeffrey Archer, Maha Chakri Sirindhorn, Hillary Clinton, and Emperor Akihito and Empress Michiko of Japan.

== Awards and honors ==
In 2023, the hotel was recognized with "Top Hospitality Honors" at the 8th International Hospitality Day organised by the International Hospitality Council (IHC) London and the International Institute of Hotel Management (IIHM). The Southern Spice restaurant at the hotel bagged honours in the Restaurants Category.

== See also ==
- Hotels in Chennai
- List of tallest buildings in Chennai
