= Taj Bengal =

Luxury hotel in Kolkata

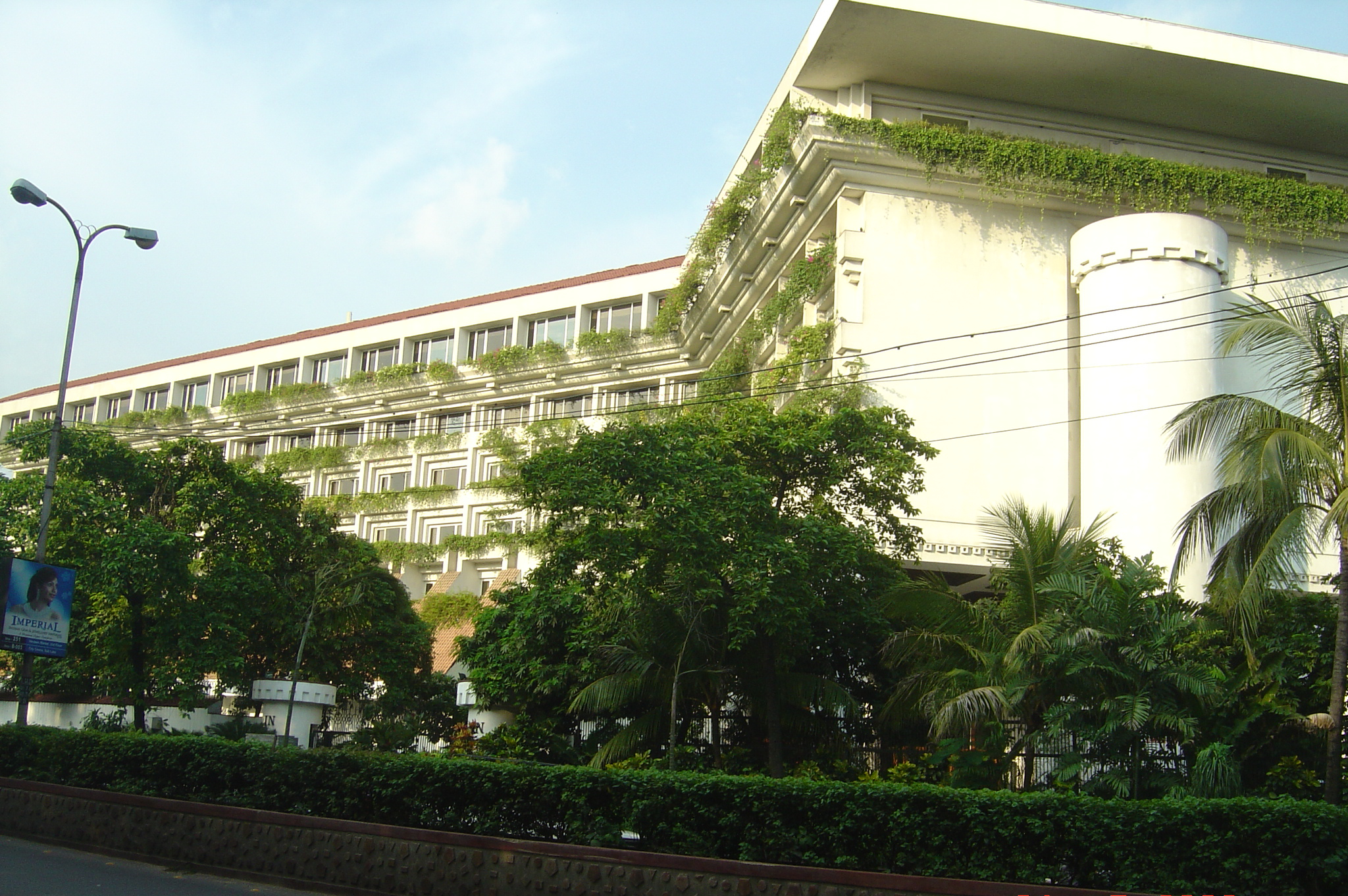
- Taj Bengal as seen from Belvedere Road
- Interactive map of the Taj Bengal area
- Hotel chain: Taj Hotels

General information
- Location: Kolkata, West Bengal, India, 34B, Belvedere Road, Alipore, Kolkata, India
- Coordinates: 22.5376948°N 88.3322639°E
- Opening: 10 October 1989
- Management: Taj Hotels

Technical details
- Floor count: 5
- Floor area: 172,956 sq ft

Design and construction
- Architect: Bob Fox

Other information
- Number of rooms: 200
- Number of suites: 29

Website
- Taj Bengal

Taj Bengal is an Indian luxury hotel in Kolkata, operated by the Taj Hotels and designed by American architect Bob Fox. The hotel was inaugurated on 10 October 1989 by Jyoti Basu, who was then the Chief Minister of West Bengal. The hotel was constructed at a cost of ₹45 crore (US$39.58 million) and took nearly five years to be completed due to protests that the hotel would disturb the migratory habits of the birds visiting the adjacent Alipore Zoo.

The hotel has 200 rooms and 29 suites, with terracotta statuary and palm-covered atrium lobby. It has fine dining restaurants such as Cal27, Sonargaon, Souk, Chinoiseire and The Chambers, along with an al fresco area and banquet halls.

Taj Bengal was the only Taj Hotels property in the state of West Bengal until Taj Gateway Hotel was opened in 2013.

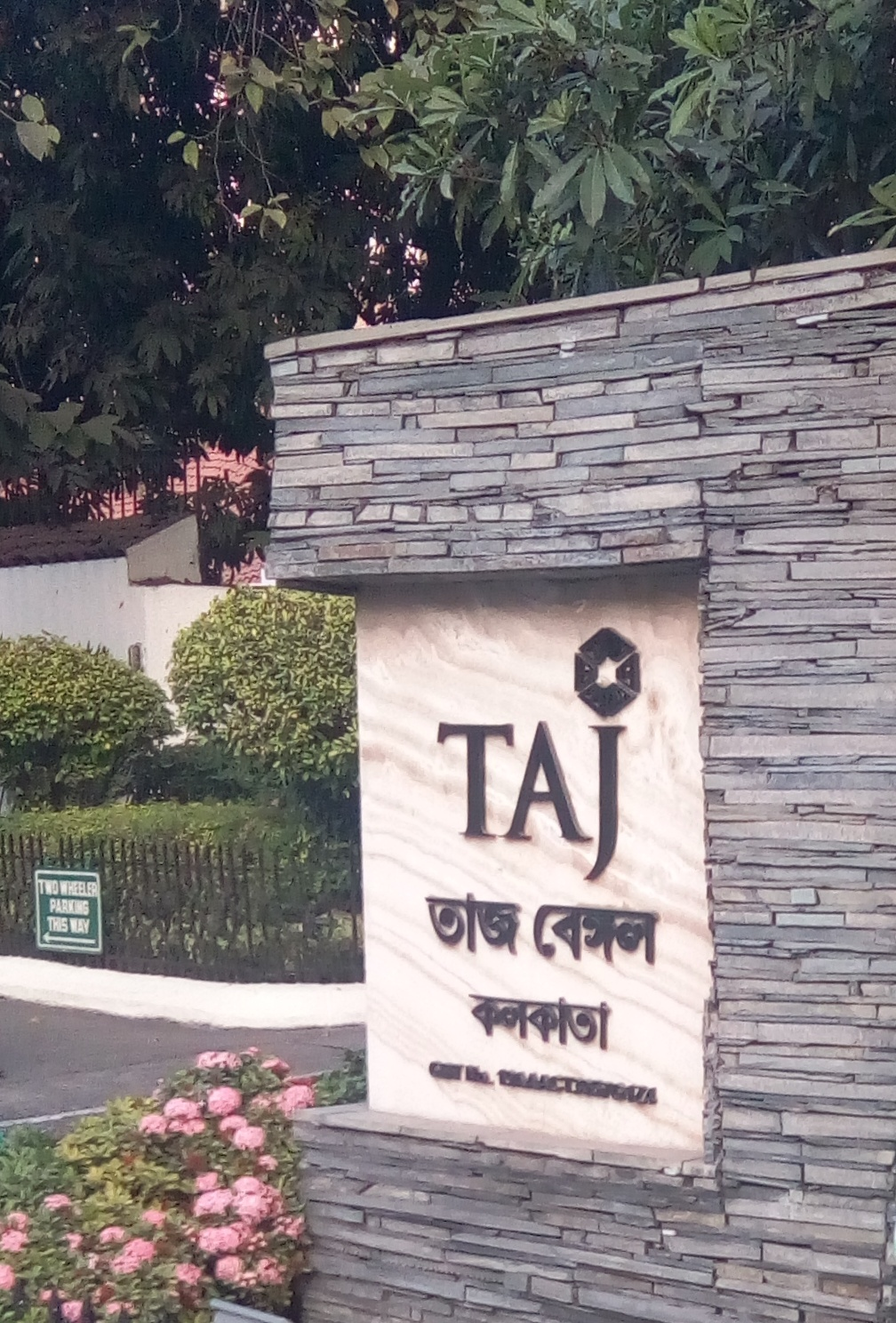
A marble plaque at the hotel entrance

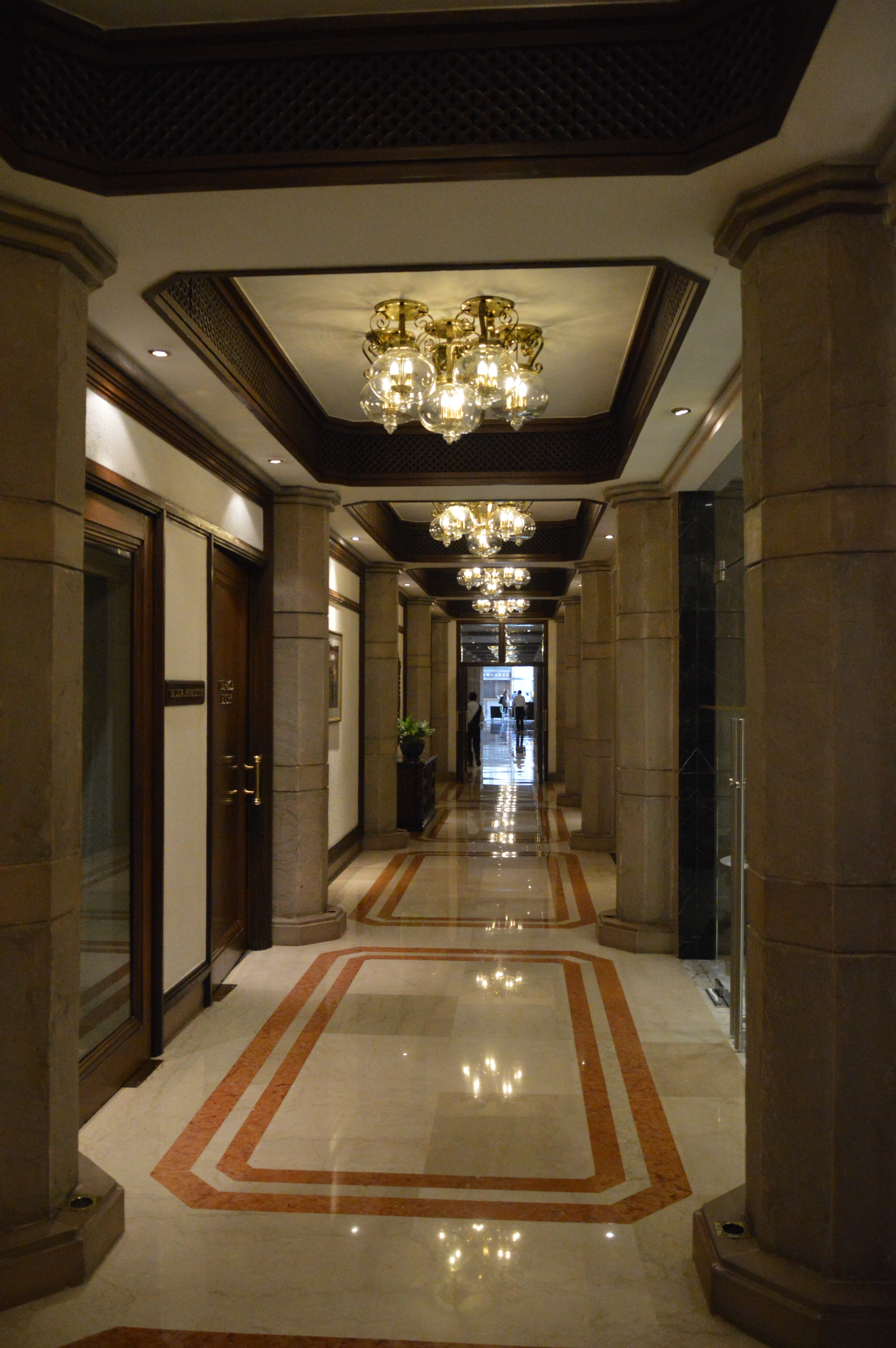
A corridor at Taj Bengal

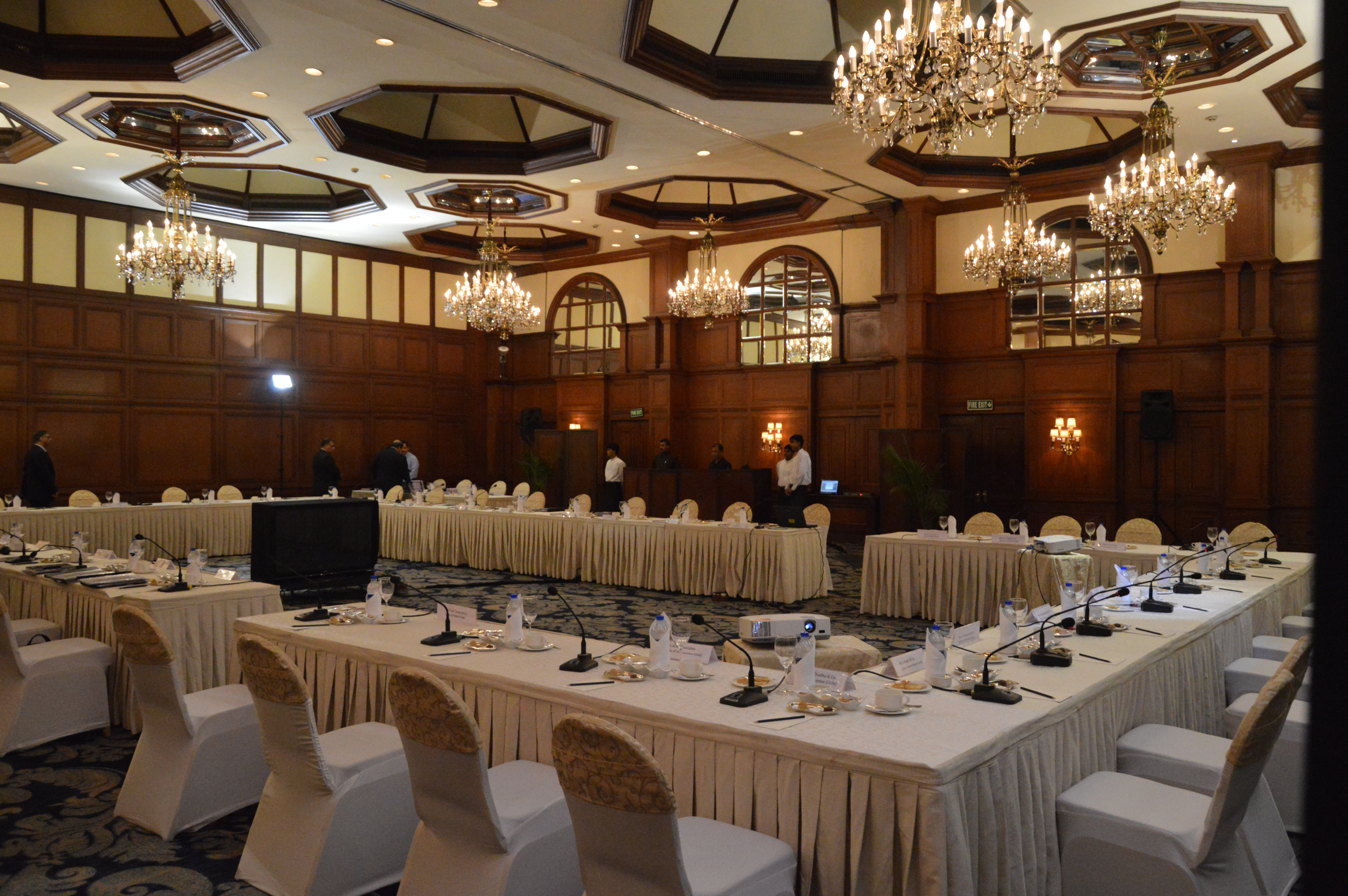
Crystal Hall at Taj Bengal

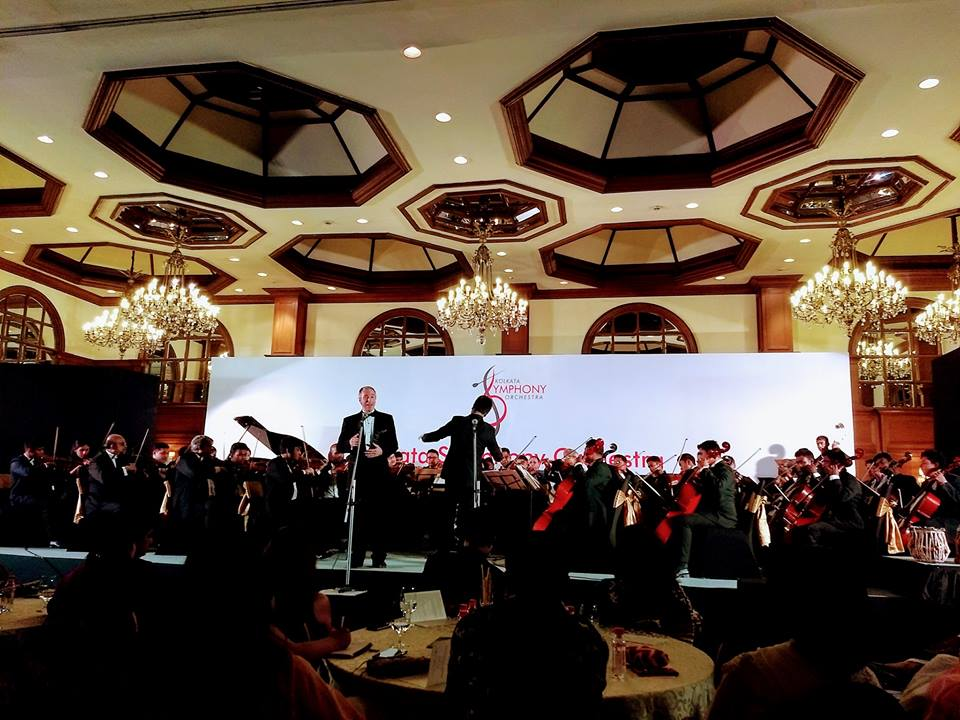
An orchestra at Taj Bengal
