= Taj Tashi =

Hotel in Thimphu, Bhutan

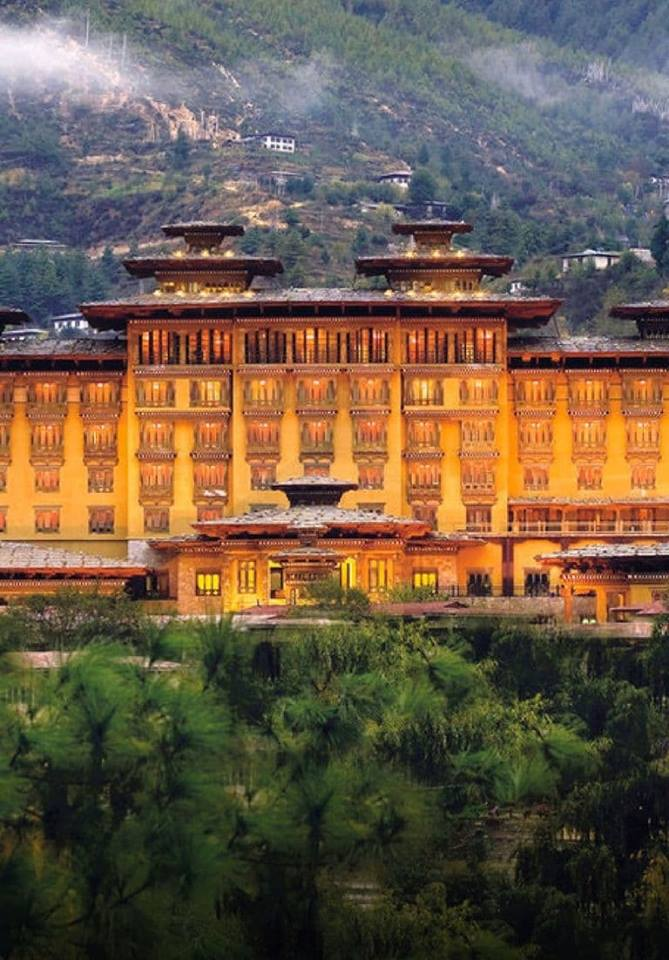

- Location within Bhutan

General information
- Architectural style: Dzong architecture inspired
- Location: Thimphu, Bhutan, 524, Samten Lam, Chubachu, Thimphu, Bhutan
- Coordinates: 27°28′11″N 89°38′24″E
- Opening: 2008
- Cost: Nu. 500 million
- Operator: Taj Leisure Hotels

Design and construction
- Developer: Tashi Group of Companies

Other information
- Number of rooms: 66
- Number of suites: 9
- Number of restaurants: 4

Website
- Taj Tashi

The Taj Tashi is a hotel in Thimphu, Bhutan. Opened in 2008, the hotel is the first five-star hotel in Bhutan. The hotel is a joint venture of Indian hotel giant, Taj Leisure Hotels and local Tashi Group. The hotel also hosts a conference space.
