= Taj Hotels =

Chain of luxury hotels based in India

- Type: Subsidiary
- Industry: Hospitality
- Founded: 1902; 124 years ago
- Founder: Jamsetji Tata
- Headquarters: Express Towers, Nariman Point, Mumbai, Maharashtra, India
- Number of locations: 200+ hotels (according to their website)
- Key people: Natarajan Chandrasekaran (chairman); Puneet Chhatwal (MD & CEO)
- Services: Hotels and resorts
- Parent: Indian Hotels Company Limited
- Website: www.tajhotels.com

Taj Hotels is a chain of luxury hotels and a subsidiary of the Indian Hotels Company Limited, headquartered in Mumbai, India. Incorporated by Jamsetji Tata in 1902, the company is a part of the Tata Group. The company employed over 20,000 people in the year 2010.

== History ==
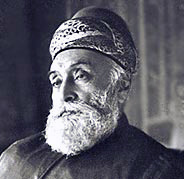
Jamsetji Tata (1839–1904), founder of Taj Hotels

Jamsetji Tata, founder of the Tata Group, opened the Taj Mahal Palace, a hotel in Mumbai (formerly called Bombay) overlooking the Arabian Sea, on 16 December 1903. It was the first Taj property and the first Taj hotel. There are several anecdotal stories about why Tata opened the Taj hotel. According to a story, he decided to open the hotel after an incident involving racial discrimination at the Watson's Hotel in Mumbai, where he was refused entry as the hotel permitted only Europeans. Hotels that accepted only European guests were very common across British India then. According to another story, he opened the hotel when one of his friends expressed disgust over the hotels that were present in Bombay then. But a more plausible reason was advanced by Lovat Fraser, a close friend of the Tata and one of the early directors of the IHCL group, that the idea had long been in his mind and that he had made a study on the subject. He did not have any desire to own a hotel but he wanted to attract people to India and to improve Bombay. Jamsetji Tata had travelled to places like London, Paris, Berlin, and Düsseldorf to arrange for materials and pieces of art, furniture and other interior decor for his hotel.

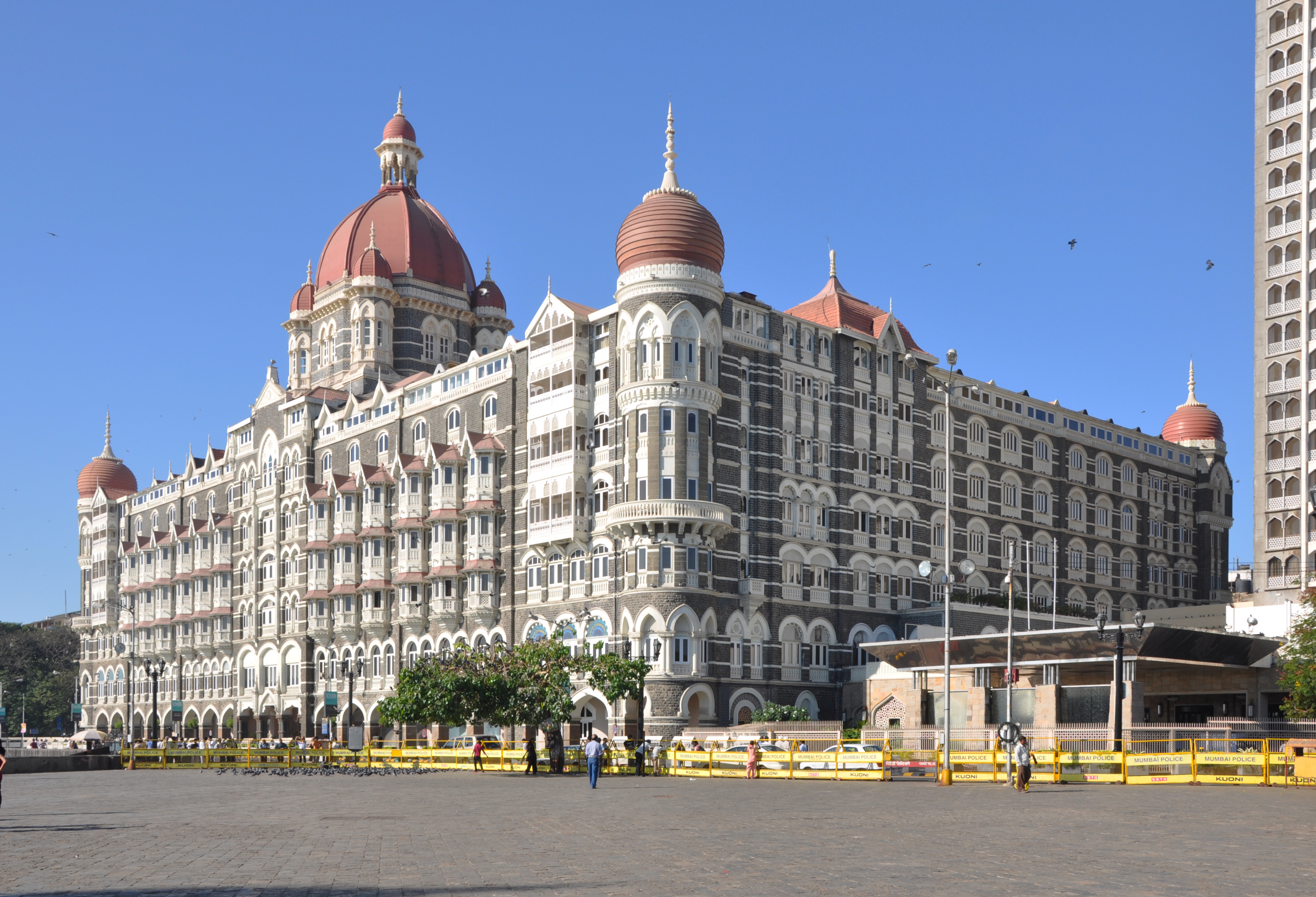
The Taj Mahal Palace in Mumbai is the first hotel of Taj, opened in the year 1903.

Main facade of Taj Gandhinagar Resort & Spa, taken from its external courtyard

=== Indian expansion ===
In 1974, the group opened India's first international five-star deluxe beach resort, the Fort Aguada Beach Resort in Goa. In 1970s, the Taj Group also began its business in metropolitan hotels, opening the five-star deluxe hotel, Taj Coromandel in Chennai, in 1974, acquiring an equity interest and operating contract for the Taj President (now Vivanta by Taj – President), a business hotel in Mumbai, in 1977, and also opening the Taj Mahal Hotel in Delhi in 1978.

The group has been converting royal palaces in India into luxury hotels since the 1970s. The first palace to be converted into a Taj luxury hotel was the Lake Palace in Udaipur, in 1971. Other examples include the Rambagh Palace in Jaipur, Umaid Bhawan Palace in Jodhpur, Falaknuma Palace in Hyderabad and Nadesar Palace in Varanasi.

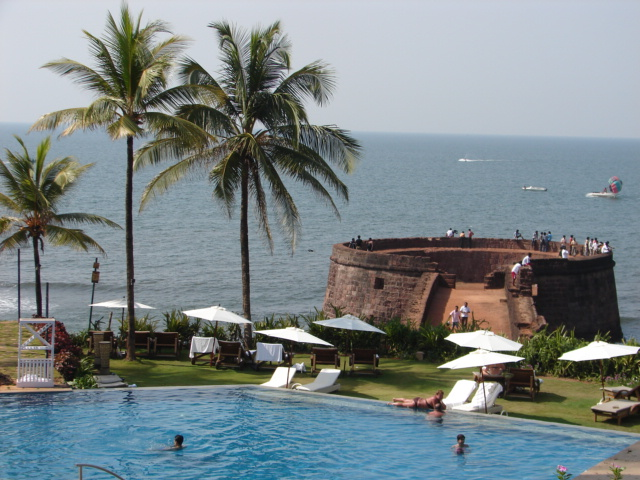
Taj Fort Aguada Beach Resort Hotel in Goa

In 1984, the Taj Group acquired, under a licence agreement, each of the Taj West End in Bengaluru, Taj Connemara, in Chennai and Savoy Hotel in Ooty. The same year, they acquired the Malabar Hotel in Kochi and reopened it in 1987 as Taj Malabar Resort & Spa. In 1989, the five-star deluxe hotel, Taj Bengal in Kolkata was opened, and with this, the Taj Group became the only hotel chain in India with a presence in the six major metropolitan cities of India, namely Mumbai, Delhi, Kolkata, Bengaluru, Hyderabad, and Chennai.

Concurrently with the expansion of its luxury hotel chain in the major metropolitan cities, the Taj Group also expanded its business hotels division in the major metropolitan and large secondary cities in India. During the 1990s, the Taj Group continued to expand its geographic and market coverage in India. It developed specialised operations (such as wildlife lodges) and consolidated its position in established markets through the upgrading of existing properties and development of new properties. Taj also set up the Taj Kerala Hotels and Resorts Limited in the early 1990s along with the Kerala Tourism Development Corporation.

=== Global expansion ===
In 1980, the Taj Group opened its first hotel outside India, the Taj Sheba Hotel in Sanaa, in Yemen and in the late 1980s, acquired interests in the St. James' Court Hotel (now comprising Taj 51 Buckingham Gate Suites and Residences and St. James' Court, A Taj Hotel) in London. In 2005, The Pierre in New York City was acquired.

On 9 March 2022, Taj Exotica Resort & Spa, The Palm, Dubai, was opened. Other properties of the group include Taj Jumeirah Lakes Towers Dubai and Taj Dubai.

== Notable hotels ==
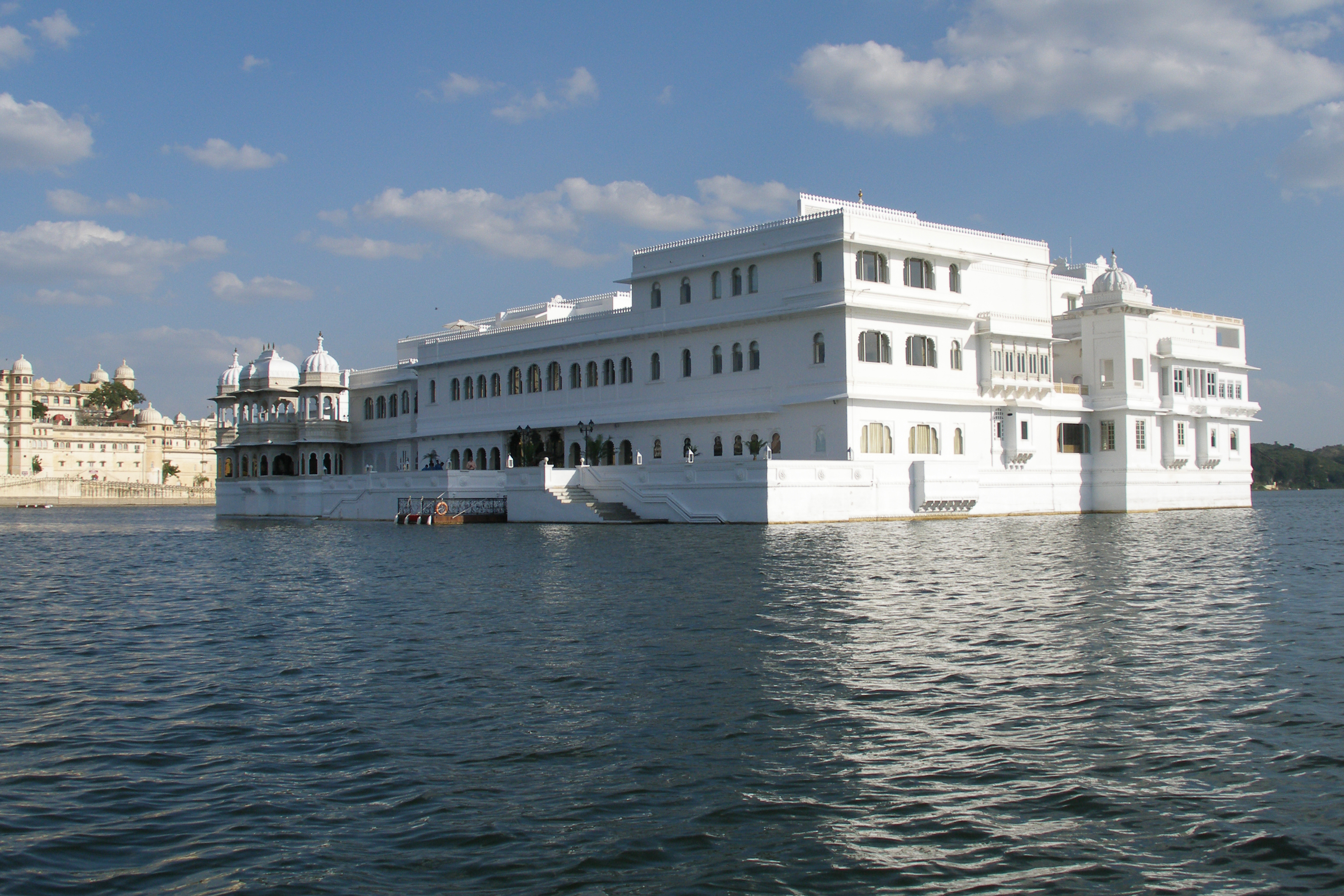
Taj Lake Palace in Udaipur

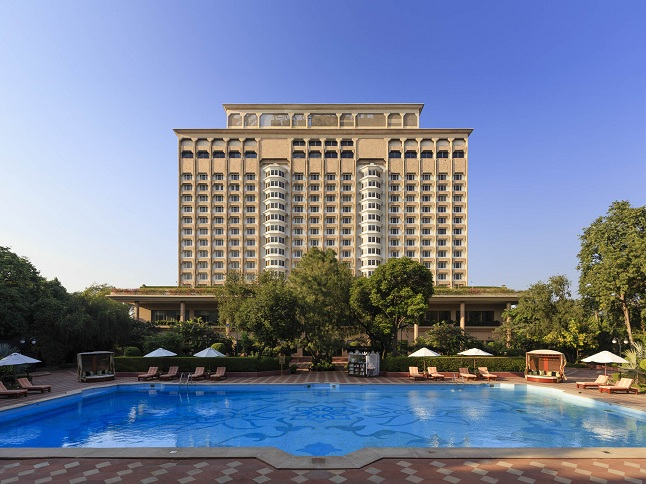
Taj Mahal Hotel in New Delhi

- Taj Mahal Palace Hotel in Mumbai
- Rambagh Palace in Jaipur
- Taj Lake Palace in Udaipur
- Umaid Bhawan Palace in Jodhpur
- Falaknuma Palace in Hyderabad
- Taj Coromandel in Chennai
- Taj West End in Bengaluru
- Taj Malabar Resort & Spa, in Kochi
- Taj Fort Aguada Resort in Goa
- Taj Connemara in Chennai
- Taj Bengal in Kolkata
- Usha Kiran Palace in Gwalior
- Taj Club House Chennai in Chennai
- Taj Fisherman's Cove Resort & Spa in Chennai
- Taj Surya Coimbatore in Coimbatore
- The Pierre in New York City
- Taj Samudra in Colombo
- Taj Tashi in Thimphu

== Recognition ==
Ten hotels of the Taj Group are members of the Leading Hotels of the World. Two hotels of the Taj Group, namely Rambagh Palace in Jaipur and the Taj Mahal Palace Hotel in Mumbai, were ranked in 2013 by Condé Nast Traveller among its "Top 100 Hotels and Resorts in the World". Condé Nast Traveller also ranked the Taj Mahal Palace in Mumbai as number 13 on its list of "Gold Standard Hotels" in 2014.

== Other ventures ==
- Institute of Hotel Management, Aurangabad – IHCL has been operating the Institute of Hotel Management at Aurangabad since 1993. The institute offers a four-year degree, designed with the help of faculty from the hospitality background with an affiliation to the University of Huddersfield in the United Kingdom.
- Taj Air – IHCL operates Taj Air, an air charter company.
