= Sinquerim =

Sinquerim Shikeri
- village
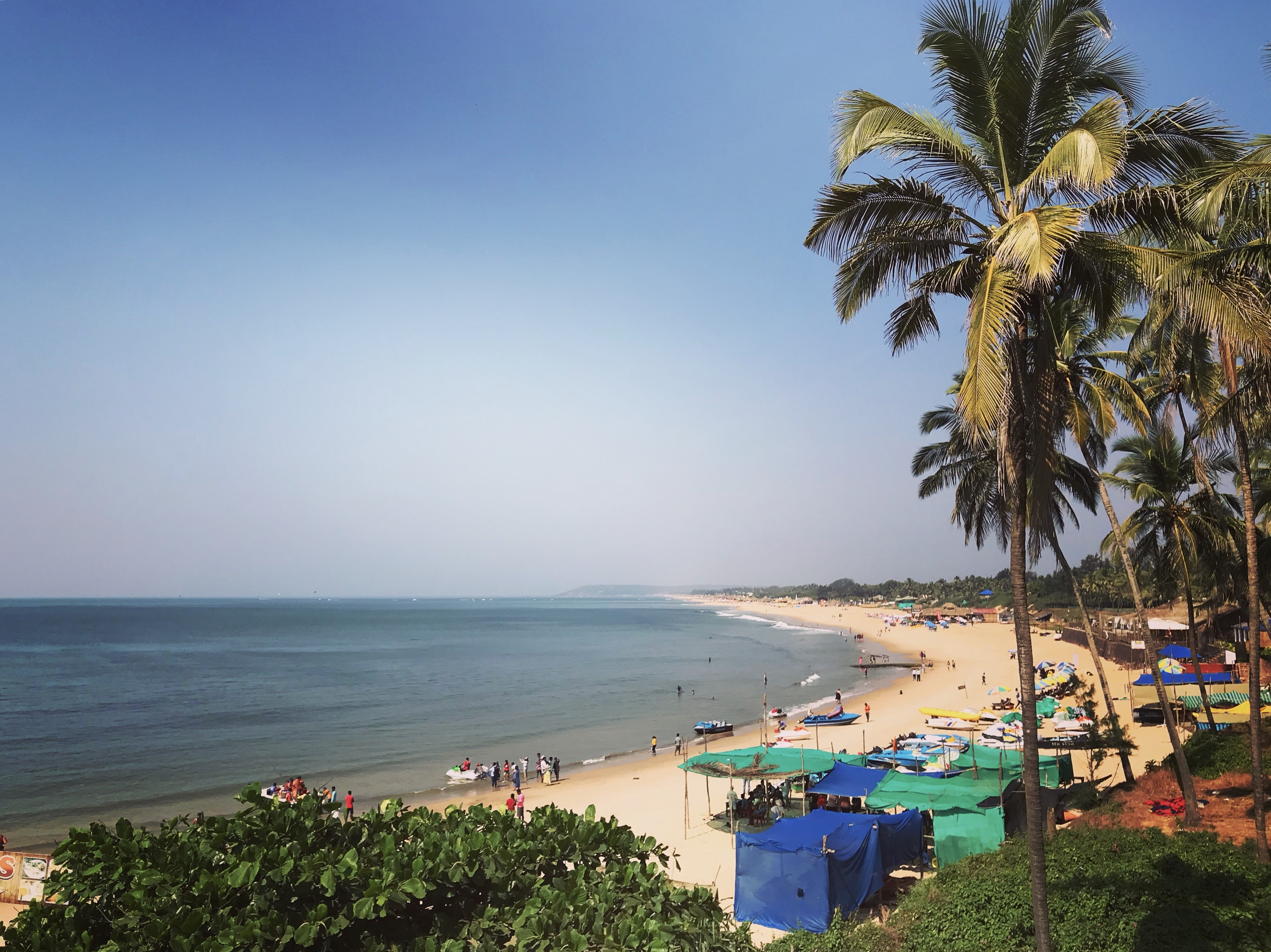

- Location in Goa, India Sinquerim (India)
- Coordinates: 15.50267°N 73.766925°E
- Country: India
- State: Goa
- District: North Goa

Languages
  - Official: Konkani
- Time zone: UTC+5:30 (IST)
- Vehicle registration: GA
- Website: goa.gov.in

Sinquerim is a village in Bardez sub-district, North Goa, India.

== Local attractions ==
Sinquerim is famous for its beach.

== Location ==
It is 16 km from Panaji. Nearest railway station is at Carambolim. Nearest airport is Dabolim Airport.
