= List of chained-brand hotels =

Marriott International, headquartered in Bethesda, Maryland outside of Washington, D.C., is the world's largest hotel chain by number of rooms.

This is the list of chain-branded hotels around the world. This is a listing of some of the major hotel brands worldwide. The hotel groups may directly own the hotels, or operate them through a franchise or management agreement.

== Hotel Groups by number of locations ==
Rank	Hotel Group	Number of locations
1	(China) Jin Jiang	12,000
2	(United States) Wyndham Hotels and Resorts	9,280
3	(United States) Marriott International	8,484
4	(China) H World Group Limited	8,176
5	(China) Huazhu Hotels Group	7,830
6	(United States) Choice Hotels International	7,500
7	(United States) Hilton Worldwide	7,165
8	(United Kingdom) IHG	6,164
9	(China) BTG Homeinns	5,916
10	(France) Accor	5,300

== Hotel Groups by number of rooms ==
Rank	Hotel Group	Number of rooms
1	(United States) Marriott International	1,683,204
2	(China) Jin Jiang	1,439,756
3	(United States) Hilton Worldwide	1,249,814
4	(China) H World Group Limited	1,017,225
5	(United Kingdom) IHG	977,257
6	(United States) Wyndham Hotels and Resorts	902,987
7	(France) Accor	850,285
8	(United States) Choice Hotels International	653,810
9	(India) OYO	597,873
10	(China) BTG Homeinns	518,031

== Hotels list ==
Holding company	Headquarters	Locations	Year established	Properties	Rooms	Category	Managed brands	Franchised brands
Accor	Paris (France)	World-wide	1967	5,584	821,518	Luxury	Raffles; Orient Express; Delano; SO/; Sofitel Legend; Fairmont; SLS; Sofitel; The House of Originals; Rixos; onefinestay; | Faena Hotels	Banyan Tree Hótels and Resorts | Emblems Collection
Accor	Paris (France)	World-wide	1967	5,584	821,518	Premium	Mantis; MGallery; Art Series; Mondrian; Pullman; Swissôtel; Angsana; 25 Hours; Hyde; Mövenpick; Grand Mercure; Peppers; The Sebel; 21c Museum Hotels	
Accor	Paris (France)	World-wide	1967	5,584	821,518	Midscale	Mantra; Novotel; Mercure; Adagio; Mama Shelter; Tribe	
Accor	Paris (France)	World-wide	1967	5,584	821,518	Economy	Breakfree; ibis; ibis Styles; ibis budget; Jo&Joe; hotelF1	
Aman Resorts	Baar, Switzerland	World-wide	1988	34		Luxury	Aman	
APA Group	Tokyo (Japan)	Japan; USA; Canada	1988	355	53,168	Midscale	Coast Hotels; APA Hotels	
Archipelago International	Jakarta (Indonesia)	World-wide	1997	150			ASTON, Collection by ASTON, Huxley, Kamuela Villas, The Alana, HARPER, Quest Hotels, HotelNeo, favehotels, Nomad Hostels	
Ascott Limited (The)	Singapore	World-wide	1984	800	135,000	Luxury	The Crest Collection; The Unlimited Collection; Preference Hotels	
Ascott Limited (The)	Singapore	World-wide	1984	800	135,000	Premium	Ascott; Oakwood Premier	
Ascott Limited (The)	Singapore	World-wide	1984	800	135,000	Upscale	Oakwood; Citadines; lyf	
Ascott Limited (The)	Singapore	World-wide	1984	800	135,000	Upper-midscale	Somerset; Vertu	
Ascott Limited (The)	Singapore	World-wide	1984	800	135,000	Midscale	Harris Hotels & Resorts	
Ascott Limited (The)	Singapore	World-wide	1984	800	135,000	Lower-midscale	Fox Hotels; YELLO	
Ascott Limited (The)	Singapore	World-wide	1984	800	135,000	Economy	POP! Hotels	
Ascott Limited (The)	Singapore	World-wide	1984	800	135,000	Uncategorized	Quest Apartment Hotels	
Avari Hotels	Karachi (Pakistan)	3 countries	1948	5		Luxury	Avari hotels	
Banyan Group Limited	Singapore	World-wide	1994	47		Luxury	Banyan Tree	
Banyan Group Limited	Singapore	World-wide	1994	47		Premium	Cassia; Angsana	
Banyan Group Limited	Singapore	World-wide	1994	47		Midscale	Dhawa	
Barrière	Paris (France)	Europe	1912	18	2,300	Luxury	Le Fouquet's Paris; Le Majestic Cannes; Les Neiges Courchevel; Le Normandy Deauville	
Belmond Limited	Hamilton (Bermuda)	World-wide	1976	41		Luxury	Belmond	
Best Western Hotels	Phoenix (USA)	World-wide	1946	4,700	369,386	Premium	Best Western Premier; Vīb; BW Premier Collection; Sadie	
Best Western Hotels	Phoenix (USA)	World-wide	1946	4,700	369,386	Midscale	Best Western; Glō; Best Western Plus; Executive Residency by Best Western; Aiden	
Best Western Hotels	Phoenix (USA)	World-wide	1946	4,700	369,386	Uncategorized	BW Signature Collection by Best Western; SureStay Hotel by Best Western; Aiden by Best Western; SureStay Plus Hotel by Best Western; SureStay Collection by Best Western	
BTG Homeinns	Shanghai (China)	China	2002	4,450	414,952	Midscale	Yitel; Homeinn Plus	
BTG Homeinns	Shanghai (China)	China	2002	4,450	414,952	Budget	Home Inns; Motel 168; Fairyland Hotels	
China Lodging Group; Huazhu Hotels Group	Shanghai (China)	China	2007	5,953	575,488	Midscale	JI Hotel; Starway Hotel; Joya Hotel; Manxin Hotels & Resorts; HanTing Plus Hotel; Orange Selected	Novotel; Mercure; Grand Mercure Hotel
China Lodging Group; Huazhu Hotels Group	Shanghai (China)	China	2007	5,953	575,488	Budget	HanTing Hotel; Hi Inn; Elan Hotel; Orange Hotel	ibis; ibis Styles
Choice Hotels International	Rockville (USA)	World-wide	1939	7,100	600,000	Premium	Ascend Hotel Collection; Cambria Hotels; Clarion	
Choice Hotels International	Rockville (USA)	World-wide	1939	7,100	600,000	Midscale	Comfort Inn & Suites; MainStay Suites; Quality Inn; Sleep Inn	
Choice Hotels International	Rockville (USA)	World-wide	1939	7,100	600,000	Budget	Econo Lodge; Rodeway Inn; Suburban Studios; WoodSpring Suites	
Cinnamon Hotels & Resorts	Colombo (Sri Lanka)	Sri Lanka, Maldives	2005	15	2,556	Luxury	Cinnamon Hotels and Resorts	
Disney Experiences	Burbank (USA)			52	41,870			
Dalata Hotel Group	Dublin (Ireland)	Ireland; United Kingdom	2008	41	8,952		Maldron; Clayton	
Dorchester Collection	London (United Kingdom)	France; Italy; UK; United States	1981	9			Dorchester Collection	
Drury Hotels	St. Louis (USA)	USA	1973	150		Midscale	Drury Plaza Hotel; Drury Suites; Drury Inn; Drury Inn and Suites	
Drury Hotels	St. Louis (USA)	USA	1973	150		Budget	Pear Tree Inn	
Dusit International	Bangkok (Thailand)	World-wide	1948	312	11,990	Luxury	Dusit Devarana; Dusit Thani; Elite Havens	
Dusit International	Bangkok (Thailand)	World-wide	1948	312	11,990	Premium	dusitD2	
Dusit International	Bangkok (Thailand)	World-wide	1948	312	11,990	Midscale	Dusit Princess	
Dusit International	Bangkok (Thailand)	World-wide	1948	312	11,990	Uncategorized	ASAI HOTELS; Dusit Residence; favstay	
Four Seasons Hotels and Resorts	Toronto (Canada)	World-wide	1960	126	24,023	Luxury	Four Seasons Hotels	
Blackstone Group (The)	Carrollton (USA)	USA; Canada; Latin America	1962	1,450+	125,017	Budget	Motel 6; Studio 6; Estudio 6; Hotel 6	
GreenTree Inns	Shanghai (China)	China; USA	2004	2,100	173,053	Budget	GreenTree Inn; Vatica Hotel; GTA Hotel; GreenTree Eastern; Shell Hotel	
Hashoo Group (Pearl-Continental & Resorts)	Dubai & Pakistan	Asia	1960	31	2600	Luxury	Pearl-Continental Hotels & Resorts PC Signature Collection	
Hashoo Group (Pearl-Continental & Resorts)	Dubai & Pakistan	Asia	1960	31	2600	Residential	PC Residences	
Hashoo Group (Pearl-Continental & Resorts)	Dubai & Pakistan	Asia	1960	31	2600	Premium	PC Legacy	
Hashoo Group (Pearl-Continental & Resorts)	Dubai & Pakistan	Asia	1960	31	2600	Midscale	Hotel One Vogue	
Hashoo Group (Pearl-Continental & Resorts)	Dubai & Pakistan	Asia	1960	31	2600	Budget	Roomph	
Hilton Worldwide	Tysons (USA)	World-wide	1919	7,780	1,216,308	Luxury	Waldorf Astoria Hotels & Resorts; Conrad Hotels; LXR Hotels & Resorts	
Hilton Worldwide	Tysons (USA)	World-wide	1919	7,780	1,216,308	Premium	Hilton Hotels & Resorts; DoubleTree; Canopy by Hilton; Curio Collection; Embassy Suites Hotels	
Hilton Worldwide	Tysons (USA)	World-wide	1919	7,780	1,216,308	Midscale	Hilton Garden Inn; Homewood Suites by Hilton; Home2 Suites; Tru by Hilton; Hampton by Hilton; Motto by Hilton	
Hongkong and Shanghai Hotels	Hong Kong	World-wide	1866	10		Luxury	The Peninsula Hotels	
Hoshino Resorts	Karuizawa (Japan)	Japan; Indonesia	1904	32		Luxury	Hoshinoya	
Hoshino Resorts	Karuizawa (Japan)	Japan; Indonesia	1904	32		Premium	Kai; Risonare	
Hoshino Resorts	Karuizawa (Japan)	Japan; Indonesia	1904	32		Midscale	OMO	
Hyatt Hotels Corporation	Chicago (USA)	World-wide	1957	939	310,000	Luxury	Park Hyatt; Grand Hyatt	
Hyatt Hotels Corporation	Chicago (USA)	World-wide	1957	939	310,000	Premium	Hyatt Regency; Hyatt Hotels; Andaz; Hyatt Place; Hyatt House Hotels; Hyatt Centric	
Indian Hotels Company Limited	Mumbai (India)	World-wide	1903	253		Luxury	Taj Hotels and Resorts; Taj Exotica; The Pierre	
Indian Hotels Company Limited	Mumbai (India)	World-wide	1903	253		Premium	Vivanta; SeleQtions; The Gateway	
Indian Hotels Company Limited	Mumbai (India)	World-wide	1903	253		Budget	Ginger Hotels	
IHG Hotels & Resorts	Windsor (UK)	World-wide	2003	6,845	1,010,756	Luxury	Six Senses; Regent Hotels & Resorts; InterContinental; Kimpton Hotels & Restaurants; JOIA by Iberostar	
IHG Hotels & Resorts	Windsor (UK)	World-wide	2003	6,845	1,010,756	Premium	Crowne Plaza; Hotel Indigo; EVEN Hotels; Staybridge Suites; HUALUXE Hotels & Resorts; Atwell Suites; Ruby Hotels; Iberostar Selection; voco	
IHG Hotels & Resorts	Windsor (UK)	World-wide	2003	6,845	1,010,756	Midscale	Holiday Inn; Holiday Inn Express; Candlewood Suites; Avid Hotels; Garner; Iberostar Waves	
Interstate Hotels & Resorts	Arlington (USA)	USA; Europe	1960	480	81,400			
InTown Suites	Atlanta (USA)	USA	1988	138	17,978	Budget	InTown Suites	
ITC Hotels	Kolkata (India)	Asia	1975	140	12,000	Luxury	ITC Hotels; Mementos; WelcomHeritage; Storii; Fortune; WelcomHotel	
Jetwing Hotels Ltd	Colombo (Sri Lanka)	Sri Lanka	1970	29		Luxury	Jetwing Hotels	
Jinjiang International	Shanghai (China)	World-wide	2003	1,566	235,500	Budget	Jinjiang Inns	
Jinjiang International	Shanghai (China)	World-wide	2003	1,566	235,500	Uncategorized	J; Rock Garden; Jinjiang; Kunlun; Jinjiang Metropolis; Campanile; Tulip Golden Tulip; 7 days; Li Feng; Zhe • Brown; Vienna	
Jumeirah	Dubai (United Arab Emirates)	World-wide	1997	26	6,747	Luxury	Jumeirah	
Jumeirah	Dubai (United Arab Emirates)	World-wide	1997	26	6,747	Premium	Zabeel House	
Kempinski	Munich (Germany); Geneva (Switzerland)	World-wide	1862	76	22,151	Luxury	Kempinski	
Kerzner International	Dubai (United Arab Emirates)	World-wide	1993	22	6,431	Ultra Luxury	One&Only Resorts	
Kerzner International	Dubai (United Arab Emirates)	World-wide	1993	22	6,431	Luxury	Atlantis; Rare Finds	
Kerzner International	Dubai (United Arab Emirates)	World-wide	1993	22	6,431	Lifestyle	Siro Hotels	
Langham Hospitality Group	Hong Kong	World-wide	1865	38	8,766	Luxury	Langham Hotels; Langham Place Hotels	
Langham Hospitality Group	Hong Kong	World-wide	1865	38	8,766	Premium	Cordis Hotels	
Langham Hospitality Group	Hong Kong	World-wide	1865	38	8,766	Midscale	Eaton Hotels; Chelsea Hotels	
Loews Hotels	New York City, New York (USA)	USA	1960	27	8,597	Luxury	Loews Hotels	
Lotte Hotels & Resorts	Seoul (Korea)	South Korea; USA; Russia; Japan; Vietnam; Myanmar; Uzbekistan	1973	28	9,896	Luxury	Signiel	
Lotte Hotels & Resorts	Seoul (Korea)	South Korea; USA; Russia; Japan; Vietnam; Myanmar; Uzbekistan	1973	28	9,896	Premium	Lotte Hotels	
Lotte Hotels & Resorts	Seoul (Korea)	South Korea; USA; Russia; Japan; Vietnam; Myanmar; Uzbekistan	1973	28	9,896	Midscale	L7 hotels; Lotte City Hotels; Lotte Resorts	
Magnuson Hotels	London (UK); Spokane (USA)	World-wide	2003	363	30,618	Midscale	Magnuson Grand; Magnuson Hotels	
Magnuson Hotels	London (UK); Spokane (USA)	World-wide	2003	363	30,618	Budget	M-Star Hotels	
Mandarin Oriental Hotel Group	Hong Kong	World-wide	1963	40	7,638	Luxury	Mandarin Oriental	
Marriott International	Bethesda (USA)	World-wide	1927	8,969	1,658,659	Luxury	Ritz-Carlton; Bulgari Hotels; Edition Hotels; JW Marriott Hotels; St. Regis; Luxury Collection; W Hotels	
Marriott International	Bethesda (USA)	World-wide	1927	8,969	1,658,659	Premium	Renaissance Hotels; Marriott; Autograph Collection; Delta; Marriott Executive Apartment; Four Points by Sheraton; Gaylord Hotels; Design Hotels; Westin Hotels & Resorts; Le Méridien; Sheraton; Tribute Portfolio; Courtyard by Marriott	
Marriott International	Bethesda (USA)	World-wide	1927	8,969	1,658,659	Midscale	MOXY Hotels; Protea Hotels; TownePlace Suites; Aloft Hotels; AC Hotels; Fairfield Inn by Marriott; SpringHill Suites; Residence Inn by Marriott; Element Hotels	
Meliá Hotels International	Palma (Spain)	World-wide	1956	358	95,000	Luxury	Gran Meliá; ME by Meliá; Paradisus	
Meliá Hotels International	Palma (Spain)	World-wide	1956	358	95,000	Premium	Meliá; Innside	
Meliá Hotels International	Palma (Spain)	World-wide	1956	358	95,000	Midscale	Sol	TRYP
Millennium & Copthorne Hotels	London (UK)	World-wide	1989	145	37,022	Premium	Grand Millenium Hotels; Millennium Hotels; Grand Copthrone Hotels	
Millennium & Copthorne Hotels	London (UK)	World-wide	1989	145	37,022	Midscale	Copthorne Hotels; M Hotels; Kingsgate Hotels	
MGM Resorts International	Paradise (USA)	Asia; United States	1986	30	47,869			
Minor Hotels	Bangkok (Thailand)	World-wide	1978	550	80,000	Luxury	Anantara Hotels & Resorts; Elewana Collection	
Minor Hotels	Bangkok (Thailand)	World-wide	1978	550	80,000	Premium	Avani Hotels & Resorts; NH Collection; nhow Hotels	
Minor Hotels	Bangkok (Thailand)	World-wide	1978	550	80,000	Midscale	Oaks Hotels, Resorts & Suites; NH Hotels; Tivoli Hotels & Resorts	
NH Hotel Group	Madrid (Spain)	World-wide	1978	368	57,466	Premium	NH Collection; nhow Hotels	
NH Hotel Group	Madrid (Spain)	World-wide	1978	368	57,466	Midscale	NH Hotels	
Oberoi Group	New Delhi (India)	World-wide	1934	20+		Luxury	Oberoi Hotels	
Oberoi Group	New Delhi (India)	World-wide	1934	20+		Premium	Trident Hotels	
Okura Nikko Hotel Management	Tokyo (Japan)	World-wide	2015	81		Luxury	The Okura Prestige	
Okura Nikko Hotel Management	Tokyo (Japan)	World-wide	2015	81		Premium	Okura Hotels & Resorts; Nikko Hotels	
Okura Nikko Hotel Management	Tokyo (Japan)	World-wide	2015	81		Midscale	Hotel JAL City	
Omni Hotels & Resorts	Dallas (USA)	USA; Canada; Mexico	1958	60	20,000	Premium	Omni Hotels & Resorts	
OYO	Gurugram (India)	World-wide	2013	20,000	449,000	Premium	OYO Hotel & Casino; OYO Vacation Homes	
OYO	Gurugram (India)	World-wide	2013	20,000	449,000	Midscale	OYO Townhouse; Capital O; Collection O; OYO Home; Palette Resort; Silver Key	
OYO	Gurugram (India)	World-wide	2013	20,000	449,000	Budget	OYO Rooms	
OYO	Gurugram (India)	World-wide	2013	20,000	449,000	Uncategorized	Spot On; OYO Life	
Pan Pacific Hotels and Resorts	Singapore	World-wide		49	15,500	Premium	Pan Pacific	
Pan Pacific Hotels and Resorts	Singapore	World-wide		49	15,500	Upscale	PARKROYAL COLLECTION; PARKROYAL	
Prince Hotels	Tokyo (Japan)	World-wide	1956	52		Premium	The Prince; Grand Prince	
Prince Hotels	Tokyo (Japan)	World-wide	1956	52		Midscale	Prince	
Radisson Hotel Group	Minneapolis (USA); Brussels (Belgium)	World-wide	1962 (Carlson); 1960 (Rezidor)	1,450	226,473	Luxury	Radisson Collection	
Radisson Hotel Group	Minneapolis (USA); Brussels (Belgium)	World-wide	1962 (Carlson); 1960 (Rezidor)	1,450	226,473	Premium	Radisson Blu; Radisson; Park Plaza; Radisson Red	
Radisson Hotel Group	Minneapolis (USA); Brussels (Belgium)	World-wide	1962 (Carlson); 1960 (Rezidor)	1,450	226,473	Midscale	Park Inn by Radisson; Country Inn & Suites; prizeotel	
Red Lion Hotels Corporation	Denver (USA)	North America	1937	1,102	70,800	Premium	Hotel RL	
Red Lion Hotels Corporation	Denver (USA)	North America	1937	1,102	70,800	Midscale	Red Lion Hotels; Red Lion Inn & Suites; Settle Inn Extended Stay	
Red Lion Hotels Corporation	Denver (USA)	North America	1937	1,102	70,800	Budget	Signature Inn; GuestHouse; Americas Best Value Inn; Canadas Best Value Inn; Country Hearth Inn & Suites; Knights Inn	
Red Planet Hotels	Bangkok (Thailand)	Indonesia; Japan; Philippines; Thailand	2010	32	5,151	Budget	Red Planet	
Red Roof Inn	New Albany, Ohio (USA)	World-wide	1973	580	46,562	Midscale	Red Roof PLUS+; The Red Collection	
Red Roof Inn	New Albany, Ohio (USA)	World-wide	1973	580	46,562	Budget	Red Roof Inn; HomeTowne Studios by Red Roof	
RIU Hotels & Resorts	Palma (Spain)	World-wide	1953	99	47,982	Uncategorized	RIU Holiday; RIU Plaza	
Rocco Forte Hotels	London (UK)	Asia; Europe	1996	11	2,500 (2015)			
Rosewood Hotel Group	Hong Kong	World-wide	2006	38	10,000	Luxury	Rosewood Hotels & Resorts	
Rosewood Hotel Group	Hong Kong	World-wide	2006	38	10,000	Premium	New World Hotels; Pentahotels; KHOS	
Rotana Hotels	Abu Dhabi (United Arab Emirates)	Middle East, Africa, Balkans, Turkey	1992	100+			Rotana Hotels & Resorts, Centro Hotels, Rayhaan Hotels & Resorts, Arjaan Hotel Apartments, Edge, The Residences	
S Hotels & Resorts	Bangkok (Thailand)	Maldives; Fiji; Mauritius; UK; Thailand	2014	39	4,647	Premium	Santiburi; SAii	Outrigger
S Hotels & Resorts	Bangkok (Thailand)	Maldives; Fiji; Mauritius; UK; Thailand	2014	39	4,647	Midscale		
Scandic Hotels	Stockholm (Sweden)	Sweden; Norway; Denmark; Finland; Germany; Poland; Belgium	1963	262	49,983	Midscale	Scandic	
Shangri-La Hotels and Resorts	Hong Kong	World-wide	1971	103	42,383	Luxury	Shangri-La Hotels	
Shangri-La Hotels and Resorts	Hong Kong	World-wide	1971	103	42,383	Premium	Kerry Hotels; Traders Hotels; Hotel Jen	
Shilo Inns	Washington County (USA)	Western USA	1974	18	4,234	Midscale	Shilo Inns	
Soneva	Bangkok (Thailand)	Maldives, Thailand	1995	3		Luxury	Soneva Fushi; Soneva Jani; Soneva Kiri; Soneva Secret	
Toyoko Inn	Tokyo (Japan)	Japan; Korea; Cambodia	1986	314	69,018			
Travelodge	Thame (UK)	UK; Ireland; Spain	1985	570	40,000			
Treebo	Bangalore (India)	India	2016	200	5,200			
Warwick Hotels and Resorts	New York City (USA)	World-wide	1980	54	8,810			
Westgate Resorts	Orlando (USA)	USA	1982	27	14,500			
Wharf Hotels	Hong Kong	Hong Kong; China; Philippines	1986	16	5,000	Luxury	Niccolo Hotels	
Wharf Hotels	Hong Kong	Hong Kong; China; Philippines	1986	16	5,000	Premium	Marco Polo Hotels; Maqo	
Whitbread	Dunstable (UK)	World-wide	1742	777 (in UK/Ireland)	71,282 (in UK/Ireland)	Midscale	Premier Inn	
Whitbread	Dunstable (UK)	World-wide	1742	777 (in UK/Ireland)	71,282 (in UK/Ireland)	Budget	hub by Premier Inn	
Wyndham Hotels & Resorts	Parsippany-Troy Hills (USA)	World-wide	1963	9,280	809,900	Premium	Wyndham Grand; Dolce; Wyndham	
Wyndham Hotels & Resorts	Parsippany-Troy Hills (USA)	World-wide	1963	9,280	809,900	Midscale	TRYP; Esplendor; Dazzler; Trademark; La Quinta; Wingate; Wyndham Garden; AmericInn; Ramada; Baymont	
Wyndham Hotels & Resorts	Parsippany-Troy Hills (USA)	World-wide	1963	9,280	809,900	Budget	Microtel; Days Inn; Super 8; Howard Johnson's; Travelodge	
Wyndham Hotels & Resorts	Parsippany-Troy Hills (USA)	World-wide	1963	9,280	809,900	Uncategorized	Hawthorn Suites	
Baglioni Hotels	Milan (Italy)	Italy; UK; Maldives	1974	7	562	Premium		

== See also ==
- Lists of hotels – index of hotel list articles on Wikipedia
- List of defunct hotel chains
