= Magnuson =

Magnuson is a patronymic surname of Scandinavian origin, meaning "son of Magnus". It may refer to:

== People ==
- Algot Magnuson of Revsnes (c.1355–c.1426), Swedish magnate, and castellan of Styresholm
- Ann Magnuson (born 1956), American actress
- Princess Christina, Mrs. Magnuson (born 1943), sister of the King of Sweden
- Christine Magnuson (born 1985), American swimmer
- Donald H. Magnuson (1911–1979), U.S. representative from Washington State
- E. Herman Magnuson (1894–1955), New York politician
- Hugo Magnuson (1900–2003), American businessman and politician from North Dakota; founder of Hugo's grocery store chain
- Jim Magnuson (1946–1991) was a Major League Baseball pitcher
- Keith Magnuson (1947–2003), Canadian professional ice hockey player
- Paul A. Magnuson (born 1937), United States District Judge from Minnesota
- Quinn Magnuson (born 1971), Canadian football player, see 1993 CFL draft
- Warren Magnuson (1905–1989), American politician from Washington State; U.S. senator 1944–81
- Trystan Magnuson (born 1985), Major League Baseball pitcher

== Other ==
- Magnuson Act, legislation named after Warren Magnuson
- Magnuson Park, in the Sand Point neighborhood of Seattle
- Magnuson Computer Systems, manufacturer of IBM-compatible mainframes
- Magnuson Hotels
