= Indian Hotels Company Limited =

Indian hotel hospitality company

The Indian Hotels Company Limited
- Type: Public
- Traded as: BSE: 500850; NSE: INDHOTEL
- ISIN: INE053A01029
- Industry: Hospitality
- Founded: 1902; 124 years ago
- Founder: Jamsetji Tata
- Headquarters: Express Towers, Mumbai, Maharashtra, India
- Key people: N Chandrasekaran (chairman); Puneet Chhatwal (MD & CEO); Ankur Dalwani (CFO & EVP)
- Products: Hotels, resorts
- Revenue: ▲₹8,565 crore (US$910 million) (FY25)
- Net income: ▲₹2,038 crore (US$220 million) (FY25)
- Total assets: ▲₹17,704 crore (US$1.9 billion) (FY25)
- Total equity: ▲₹12,415 crore (US$1.3 billion) (FY25)
- Owner: Tata Sons (35.74%)
- Number of employees: 40,726 (2024)
- Parent: Tata Group
- Subsidiaries: Taj Hotels; Vivanta; Ginger Hotels; The Pierre
- Website: www.ihcltata.com

The Indian Hotels Company Limited (IHCL) is an Indian multinational hospitality company that manages a portfolio of hotels, resorts, jungle safaris, palaces, spas and in-flight catering services. The company is part of India's Tata Group. IHCL was founded in 1902 by Jamsetji Tata and is headquartered in Mumbai where its flagship hotel Taj Mahal Palace Hotel is also located.

IHCL's hotel chains include Taj, SeleQtions, Vivanta, Tree of Life and Ginger. The company also operates TajSATS Air Catering, in a joint venture with SATS of Singapore.

== History ==
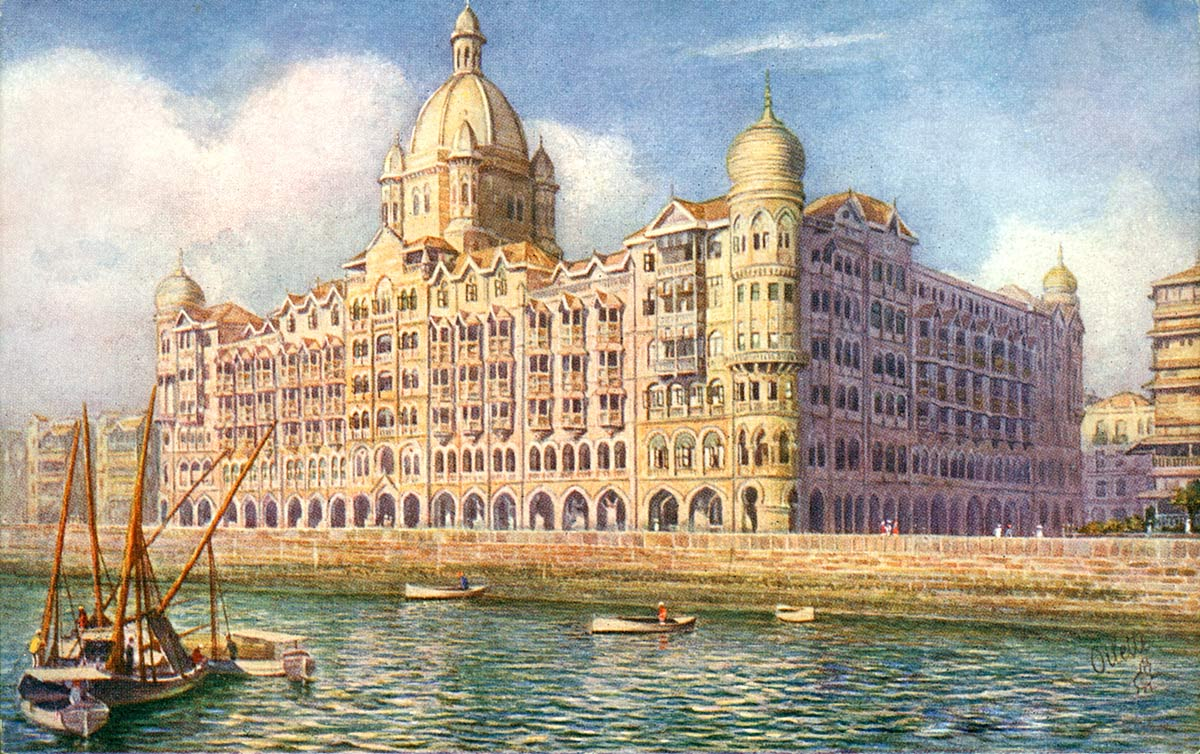
Taj Mahal Palace Hotel c. 1908

The company was founded by Tata Group founder and industrialist Jamshedji Tata. He incorporated Indian Hotels Company Limited in 1899 and registered in 1902. The first hotel of the company was opened — The Taj Mahal Palace Hotel in Colaba neighbourhood of Bombay opened in 1903. It was the first five star hotel in India with modern elevators and Russian carpets.

In 1980 the Taj Group opened their first international hotels: the Taj Sheba Hotel in Sana'a, Yemen and the Taj Pamodzi in Lusaka, Zambia. IHCL entered the Sri Lankan market with Taj Exotica Bentota and Taj Samudra in Colombo. In joint venture with G. V. Krishna Reddy, Taj Hotels formed Taj GVK. IHCL entered Middle Eastern market with opening a hotel in Dubai — the Taj Palace Hotel Dubai. Next year the company opened three more hotels — the Regent Hotel in Mumbai, Rawal-Kot in Jaisalmer and Usha Kiran Palace in Gwalior.

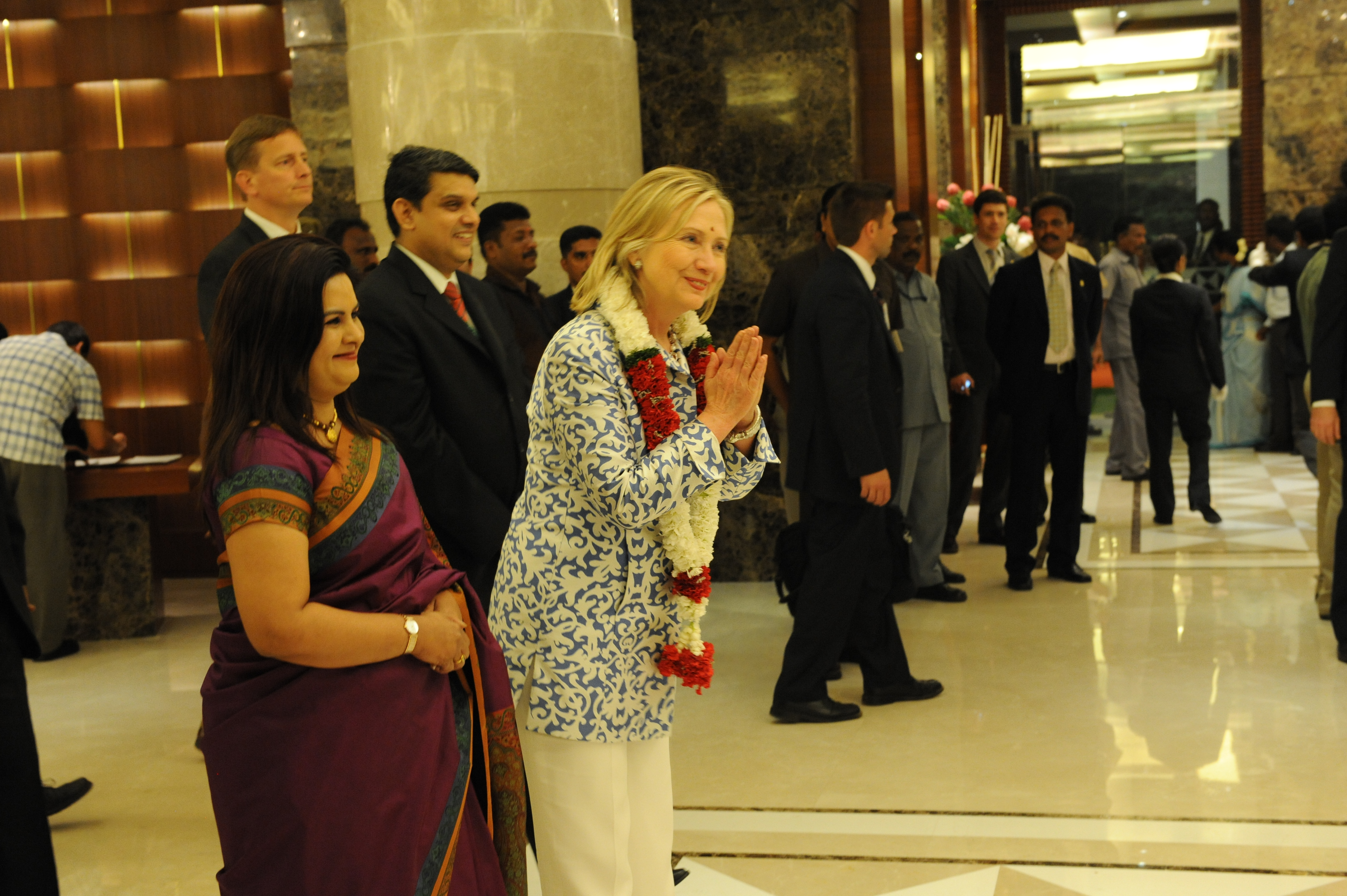
U.S. Secretary of State Hillary Rodham Clinton is greeted by employees at the Taj Coromandel with a traditional greeting in Chennai, on in 2011

The company planned to open hotels in Jamshedpur and Ranchi. Taj Surya was opened in Coimbatore and later renamed as Vivanta.

In May 2017, IHCL announced it was moving all of its hotels under a unique brand, Taj Hotels Palaces Resorts Safaris. The brands Vivanta by Taj and Gateway were merged into a single business unit. During the summer of 2017, Cyrus Mistry stated that some of the group's latest costly acquisitions (Sea Rock Hotel, The Pierre in New York, Taj Boston) "destroyed the economic value of the company". The unique brand decision was reversed in 2018.

In April 2018, the group opened its first location in Saudi Arabia through a partnership with the Umm al-Qura construction company.

In 2019, IHCL launched Amã Stays and Trails, a business division for managing heritage bungalows, homestays, and guesthouses. In April 2019, IHCL launched the hotel brand SeleQtions with 12 location openings. In May 2019, IHCL signed a strategic partnership with Singapore's sovereign wealth fund GIC to acquire $600 million worth of hotel assets over three years.

In 2020, IHCL launched its online food ordering app Qmin, which later expanded to include quick-service restaurants and food trucks.

In 2024, IHCL acquired a 55% stake in Tree of Life Resorts & Hotels. In 2025, IHCL entered an agreement to operate The Claridges in Delhi for 25 years. Later that year, the company announced that it would bring some of its existing hotels under the Claridges Collections brand. In 2025, IHCL acquired a 51% stake in two firms that operated 135 properties under Clarks Hotels & Resorts.

In 2025, IHCL acquired a 51% stake in Atmantan wellness retreat in Mulshi, Pune district. In 2026, IHCL acquired a 51% stake in Brij Hospitality which operated 22 hotels under Brij brand.

== Brands ==
Type	Brand	Overview
Luxury	Taj Hotels and Resorts	Taj is the luxury hotels brand with 90 hotels in more than 70 locations. Its portfolio consists of luxury hotels, resorts, jungle safaris and palaces.
Upscale	Vivanta	Vivanta is the upscale hotels brand of the company with 25 hotels in 20 locations. It has properties mostly in tier 2 and tier 3 cities of India like Coimbatore, Vadodara and Bhubaneswar.
Premium	SeleQtions	Brand that includes hotels such as The Gateway Savoy in Ooty, Vivanta by Taj President in Mumbai, Vivanta by Taj-Blue Diamond in Pune and Vivanta by Taj-Ambassador in Delhi.
Midscale	The Gateway	The Gateway is a chain of midscale hotels.
Midscale	Ginger	Ginger is a midscale hotels chain with 86 hotels in 40 locations. The first hotel was opened in Whitefield, Bangalore in June 2004.

== Notable Hotels ==
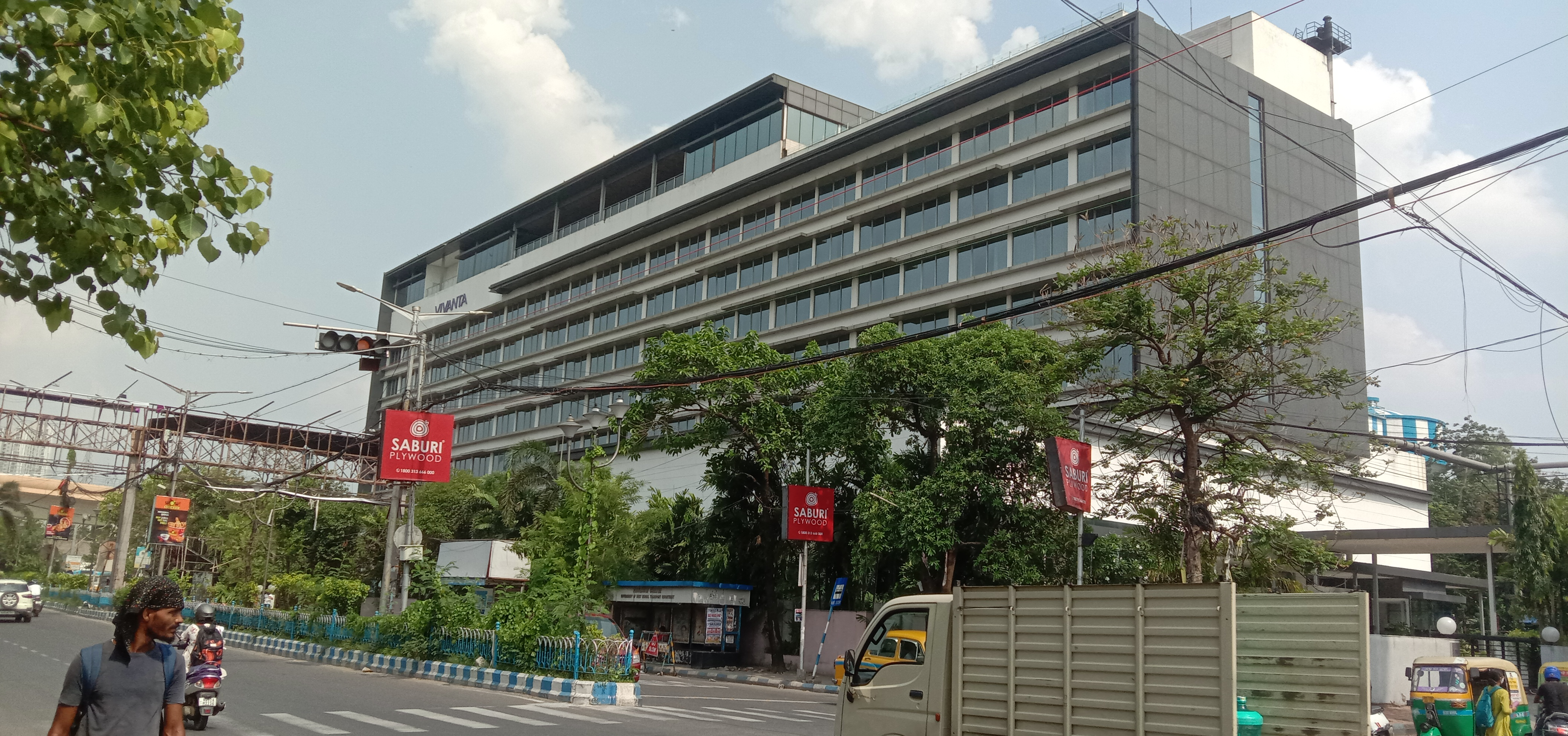
Vivanta Kolkata EM Bypass in Kolkata, India

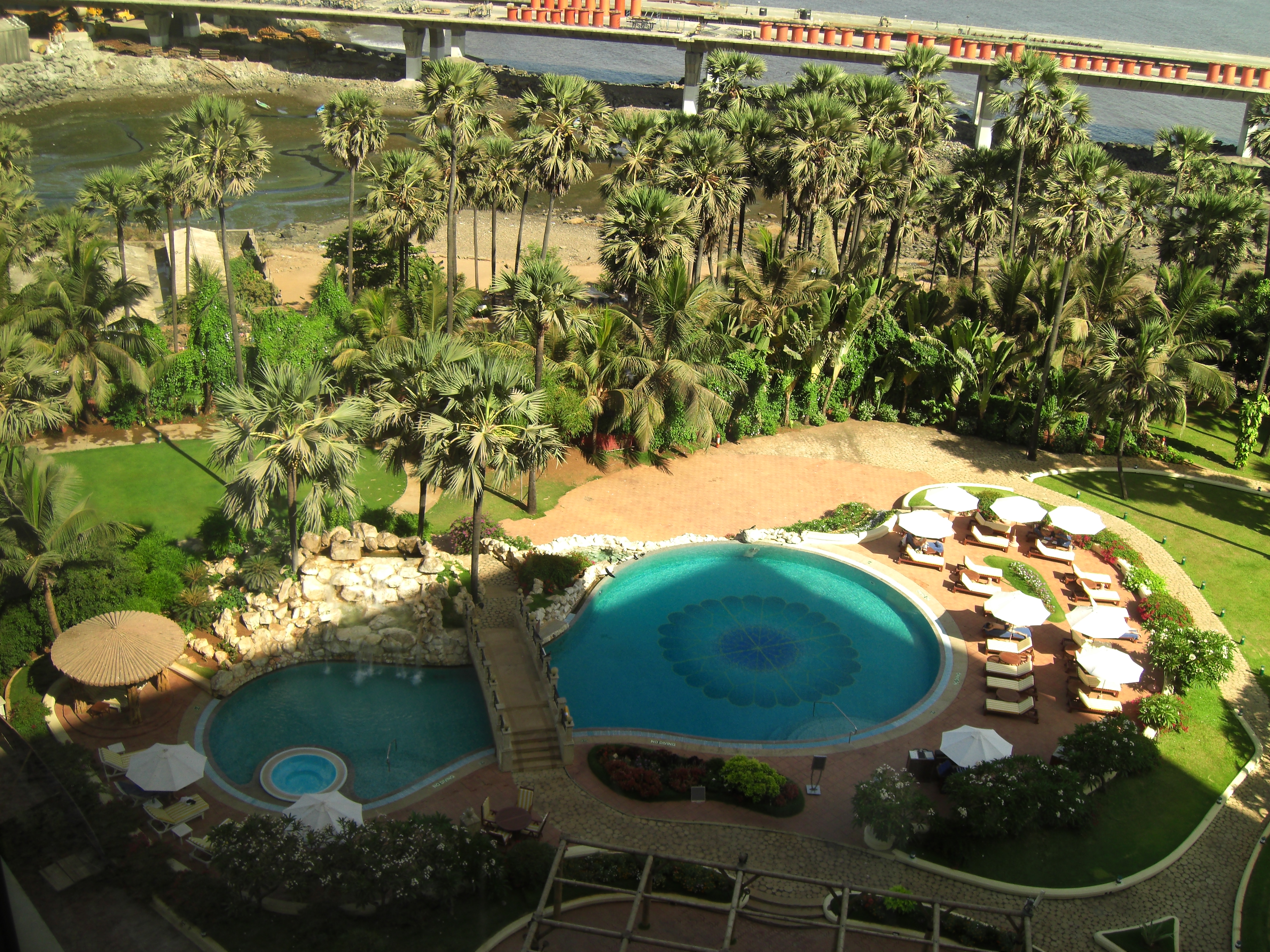
The swimming pool of Taj Lands End that is near Bandra Worli Sea Link in Mumbai

- Taj Mahal Palace Hotel, Mumbai, India
- Taj Malabar Resort & Spa, Kochi
- Taj Club House Chennai
- Taj Connemara, Chennai, India
- Taj Coromandel, Chennai, India
- Taj Fisherman's Cove Resort & Spa, Chennai, India
- Taj Fort Aguada Resort, Goa, India
- Taj Samudra, Colombo, Sri Lanka
- Vivanta Coimbatore, Coimbatore, India
- Taj West End, Bangalore, India
- Umaid Bhawan Palace, Jodhpur, India
- Usha Kiran Palace, Gwalior, India
- Taj Falaknuma Palace, Hyderabad, India
- The Pierre, New York City, United States
- The Newbury Boston, Boston, United States
- Rambagh Palace, Jaipur, India
- Lake Palace, Udaipur, India

== See also ==
- List of hotels in India
- List of chained-brand hotels
