= Microtel =

Microtel may refer to:

- Microtel Inn and Suites, a franchise brand of hotels owned by Wyndham Hotels and Resorts
- Microtel Communications, the former name of Orange Personal Communications Services Ltd in the UK before its acquisition and merging by France Telecom S.A., now Orange S.A.
- Microtel Pacific Research, formerly AEL Microtel then just Microtel, a former research arm of BC Tel in Canada
