= Wyndham Hotels & Resorts =

American hotel chain and management company

Wyndham Hotels & Resorts, Inc.
- Type: Public
- Traded as: NYSE: WH; S&P 400 component
- Industry: Hospitality
- Founded: 1981; 45 years ago in Dallas, Texas, U.S.
- Founder: Trammell Crow
- Headquarters: Parsippany, New Jersey, U.S.
- Number of locations: 9,286 (2024)
- Key people: Geoffrey A. Ballotti (President)
- Brands: See § Brands
- Revenue: ▲US$1.41 billion (2024)
- Operating income: ▼US$495 million (2024)
- Net income: US$289 million (2024)
- Total assets: ▲US$4.22 billion (2024)
- Total equity: ▼US$650 million (2024)
- Number of employees: 2,200 (2024)
- Website: wyndhamhotels.com

Wyndham Hotels & Resorts, Inc., is an American hospitality company based in Parsippany, New Jersey. It describes itself as the largest hotel franchisor in the world, with 9,100 locations.

The company was formed on June 1, 2018, as a spin-off from Wyndham Worldwide, which is now known as Travel + Leisure. As of 2024, it has a portfolio of 25 hotel brands, amongst them are Days Inn, Howard Johnson's, Ramada, Super 8 and Travelodge.

== History ==
=== Early history ===
The Wyndham hotel brand was created in 1981 in Dallas, Texas, by Trammell Crow, the president of Trammell Crow Company. Business journalist Wyndham Robertson, who wrote a profile of Crow for Fortune magazine in the early 1970s, claimed that the hotel chain was named for her, saying, "He loved my name. I never got him to admit that he named [the hotels] for me in public but he did in private." As the chain grew, it was acquired in 1998 by Patriot American Hospitality, later named Wyndham International.

Blackstone Group bought Wyndham International in 2005, and later that year sold the Wyndham hotel brand to Cendant. Cendant's predecessor was Hospitality Franchise Systems (HFS), founded in 1990 as a vehicle to acquire hotel franchises. By 1995, it had acquired the Days Inn, Howard Johnson, Ramada, and Super 8 brands. HFS then expanded into other businesses, and, in 1997, merged with CUC International to form Cendant Corporation.

=== Wyndham Hotel Group (2006–2018) ===
In 2006, as part of a plan to break Cendant up into four separate companies, its hotel and timeshare businesses were spun off as Wyndham Worldwide. As a division of Wyndham Worldwide, Wyndham Hotel Group was composed of more than 9,000 hotels under 21 brands, located in over 75 countries, competing in brand markets ranging from economy to upscale. It had more than 40,000 employees around the world. Lodging management services were provided to upscale properties through Wyndham Hotel Management.

In 2008, Wyndham purchased U.S. Franchise Systems, owner of the Microtel and Hawthorn Suites brands, from Global Hyatt Corporation for $150 million. Wyndham bought the Wisconsin-based Exel Inn chain in 2008 and converted all 22 of its properties to Wyndham brands. As of 2008, Wyndham Destinations' franchisees have formed an independent association called Owners 8 Association to present their concerns and grievances to Wyndham Destinations. The association has argued that individual franchisees have currently limited role in Wyndham's decision making. Wyndham Hotel Group's Former CEO Eric A. Danziger, in an interview in 2009 with Asian Indian Hotel Owners magazine, emphasized that Wyndham maintains cordial relationships with franchisees. He also stated that each of Wyndham's brands maintains an advisory board of individual property owners.

In 2010, Wyndham acquired the TRYP hotel brand from Sol Meliá Hotels & Resorts of Spain. The brand, subsequently renamed Tryp by Wyndham, was positioned as a "select-service, midmarket" brand representing approximately 13,000 rooms and caters to business and leisure travelers in cosmopolitan cities including Madrid, Barcelona, Paris, Lisbon, New York, Frankfurt, Montevideo, Buenos Aires, São Paulo, Istanbul, etc.

The Federal Trade Commission (FTC) filed suit against Wyndham in June 2012 following a security breach that led to the theft of payment card data for hundreds of thousands of Wyndham customers. Wyndham decided to fight the lawsuit in court, unlike many companies, which often try to settle FTC data-security enforcement actions quickly. In April 2014, United States District Court for the District of New Jersey Judge Esther Salas denied Wyndham's motion to dismiss, in a much-anticipated decision to this case.

In late 2016, Wyndham acquired Latin America's Fën Hotels, adding 26 management contracts across Argentina, Peru, Costa Rica, Uruguay, Paraguay, Bolivia, and the U.S., including two new Fën-built Wyndham Grand hotels in Uruguay and Paraguay. With the addition of Fën Hotels' Esplendor Boutique Hotel and Dazzler Hotel brands, Wyndham Hotel Group's portfolio of distinct brands grew to 18.

In the summer of 2017, Wyndham announced plans to acquire the Minnesota-based AmericInn hotel brand and its management company, Three Rivers Hospitality, from Northcott Hospitality for $170 million. AmericInn's portfolio consisted of 200 primarily franchised hotels with approximately 11,600 rooms in 22 states, predominately in the Midwestern U.S., Ohio Valley, and Mountain states. In August 2017, Wyndham announced plans to spin off Wyndham Hotel Group to shareholders as a separate publicly traded company. In October 2017, Wyndham launched its first soft brand product, the Trademark Hotel Collection, a collection of more than 50 upper-midscale-and-above hotels in Europe and the U.S.

In April 2018, the company began rebranding most of its brands to include the Wyndham name, such as "Days Inn by Wyndham", "Ramada by Wyndham", and "Super 8 by Wyndham". On May 30, 2018, Wyndham purchased the La Quinta hotel brand (franchised to 900 hotels with over 89,000 rooms) and its associated management business, for $1.95 billion in cash.

=== Wyndham Hotels & Resorts since 2018 ===
The spin-off of Wyndham's hotel business occurred on May 31, 2018, creating Wyndham Hotels & Resorts. In June 2024, the hotel chain has more than 9,200 hotels in over 95 countries, represented by 24 brands. In October 2023, Choice Hotels announced a proposal to purchase all outstanding shares of Wyndham for $90 per share. That offer came after Wyndham declined a direct acquisition bid from Choice.

In 2024, Wyndham announced a partnership with WaterWalk, rebranding them to WaterWalk Extended Stay by Wyndham, adding 11 more hotels and 1500 more rooms.

In June 2026, a fatal fire at the Viva Wyndham Dominicus Beach Hotel in Bayahíbe, Dominican Republic, forced the evacuation of nearly 1,700 guests and left several injured. Francesca Valentino, an Italian tourist died during the incident.

== Brands ==
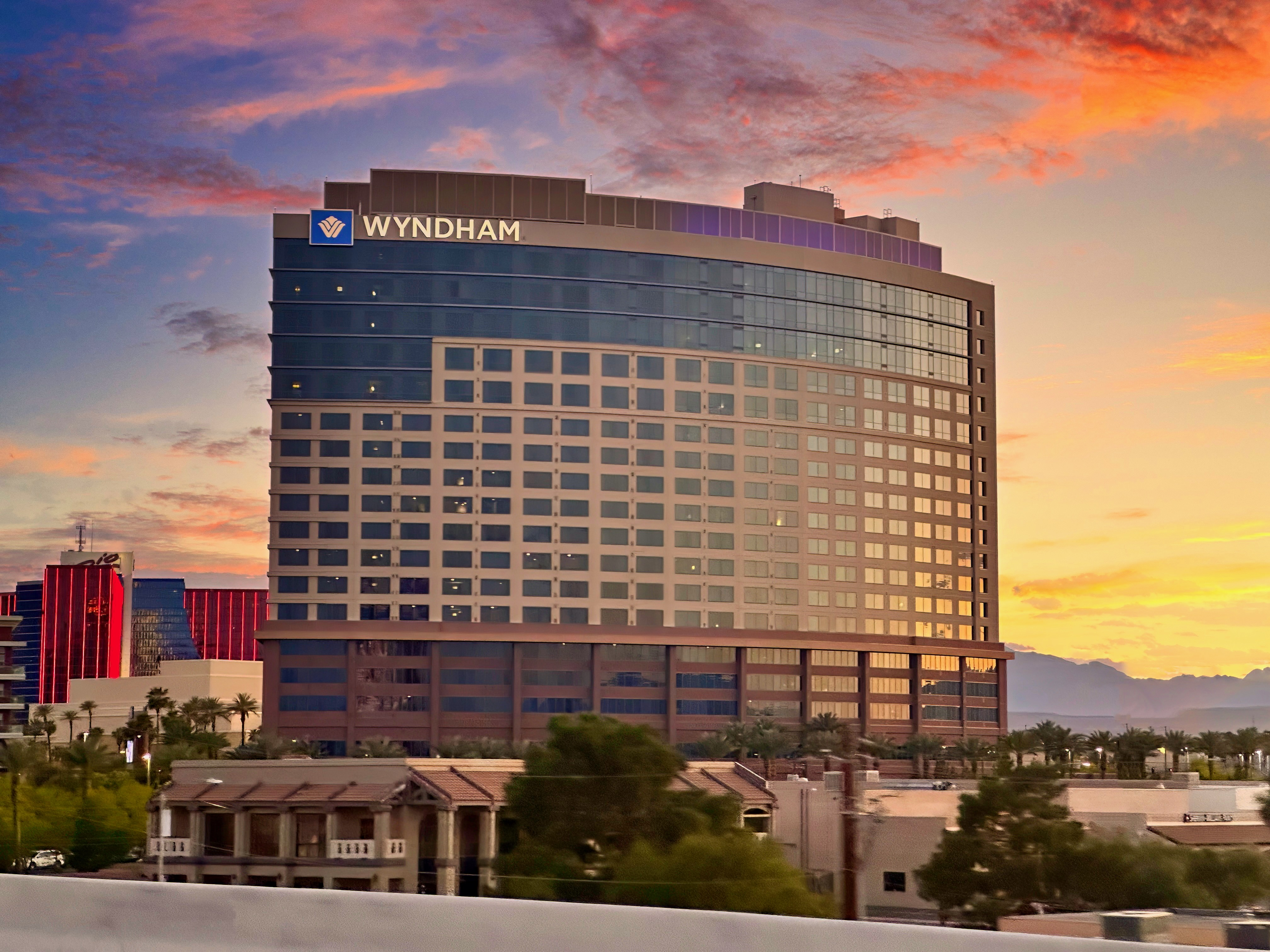
Wyndham in Las Vegas

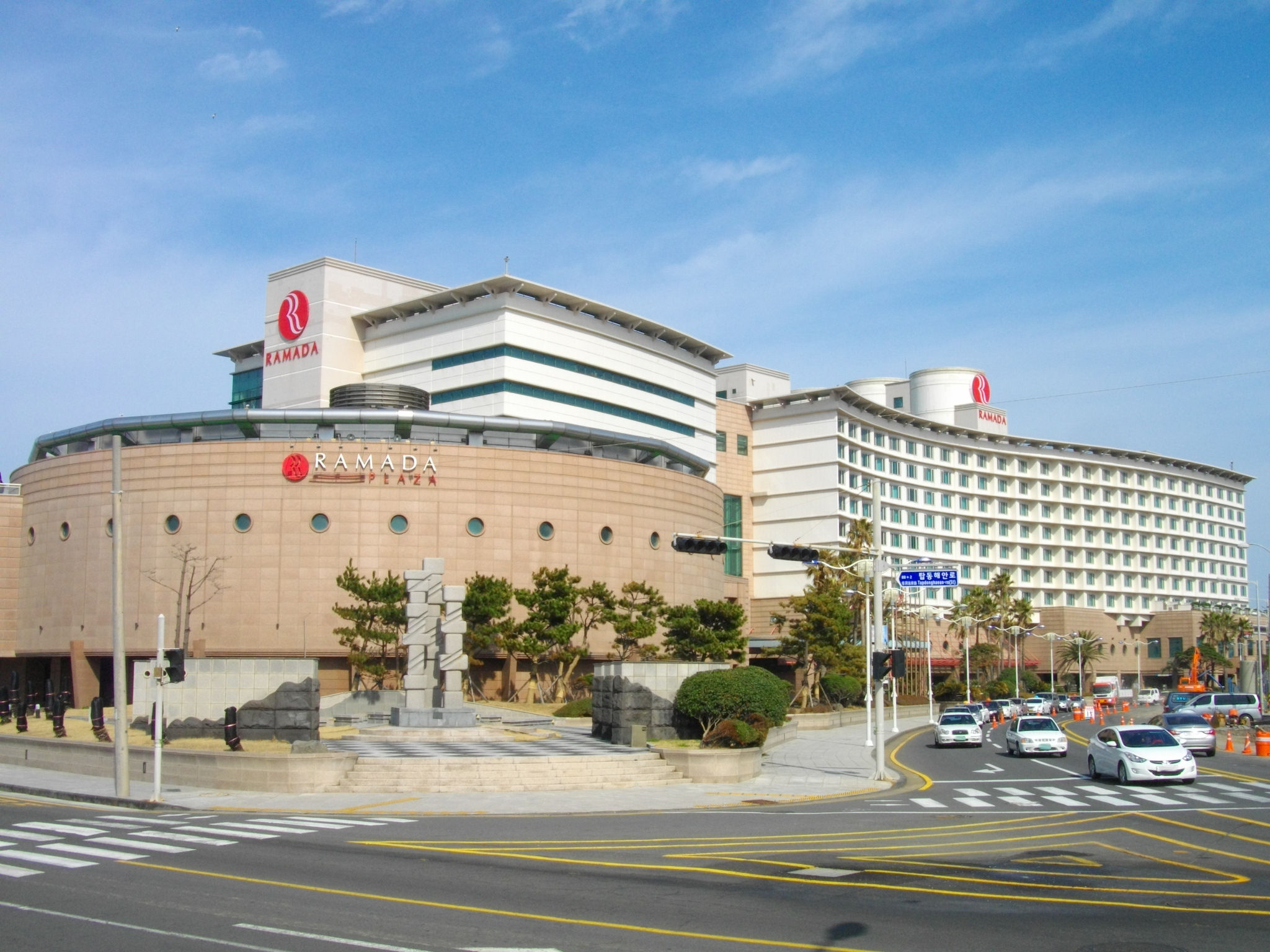
Ramada in Jeju

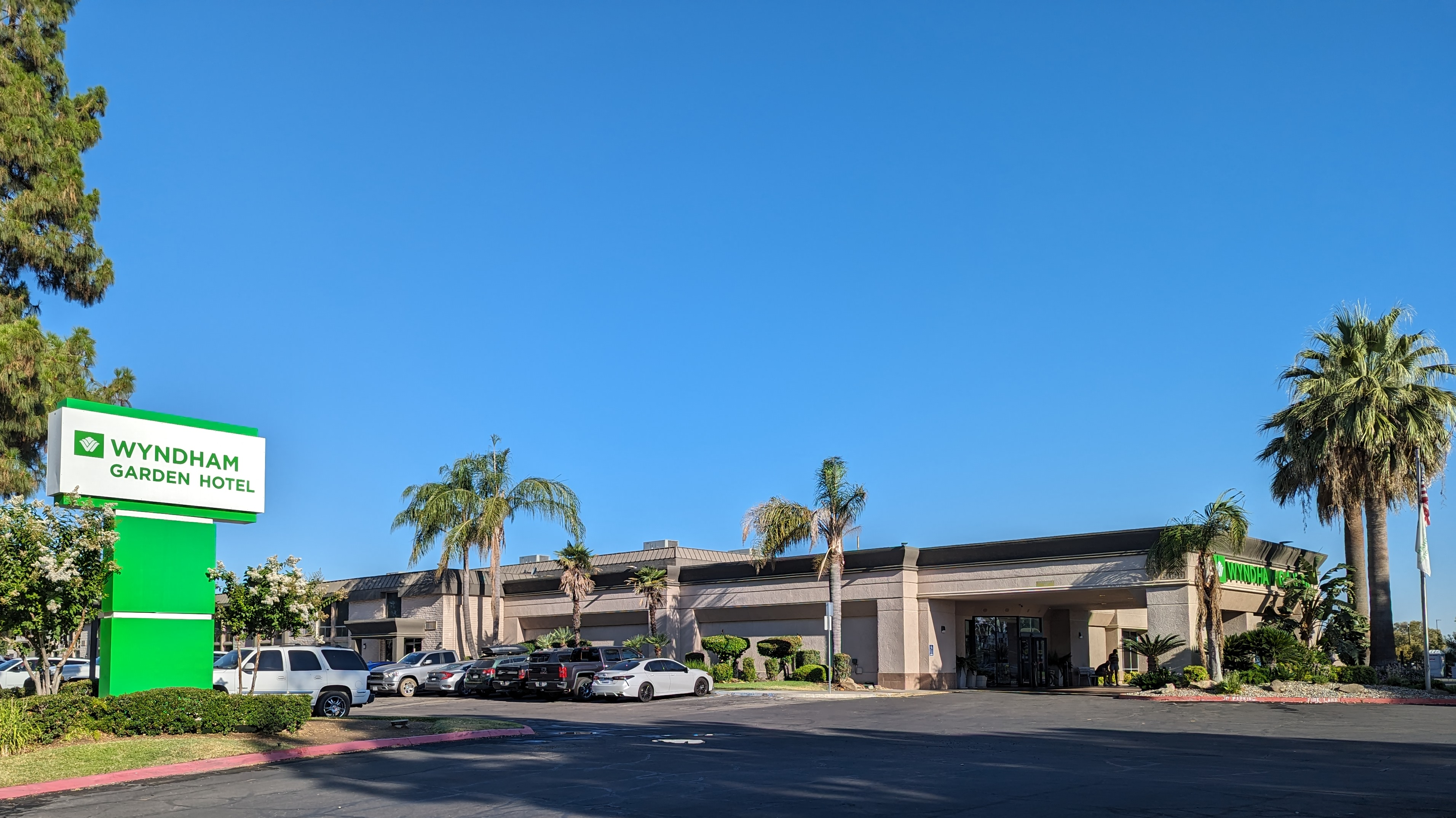
Wyndham Garden in Fresno

As of 2024, Wyndham Hotels & Resorts includes 25 brands:

- AmericInn by Wyndham
- Baymont by Wyndham
- Days Inn by Wyndham
- Dazzler by Wyndham
- Dolce Hotels and Resorts by Wyndham
- Echo Suites Extended Stay by Wyndham
- Esplendor Boutique Hotels
- Hawthorn Extended Stay
- Howard Johnson by Wyndham
- La Quinta by Wyndham
- Microtel by Wyndham
- Ramada by Wyndham
- Ramada Encore by Wyndham
- Registry Collection Hotels
- Super 8 by Wyndham
- Trademark Collection by Wyndham
- Travelodge
- TRYP by Wyndham
- Vienna House by Wyndham
- Waterwalk by Wyndham
- Wingate by Wyndham
- Wyndham
- Wyndham Alltra
- Wyndham Garden
- Wyndham Grand
