= Shilo Inns =

American hotel chain

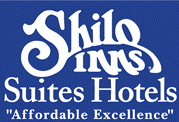

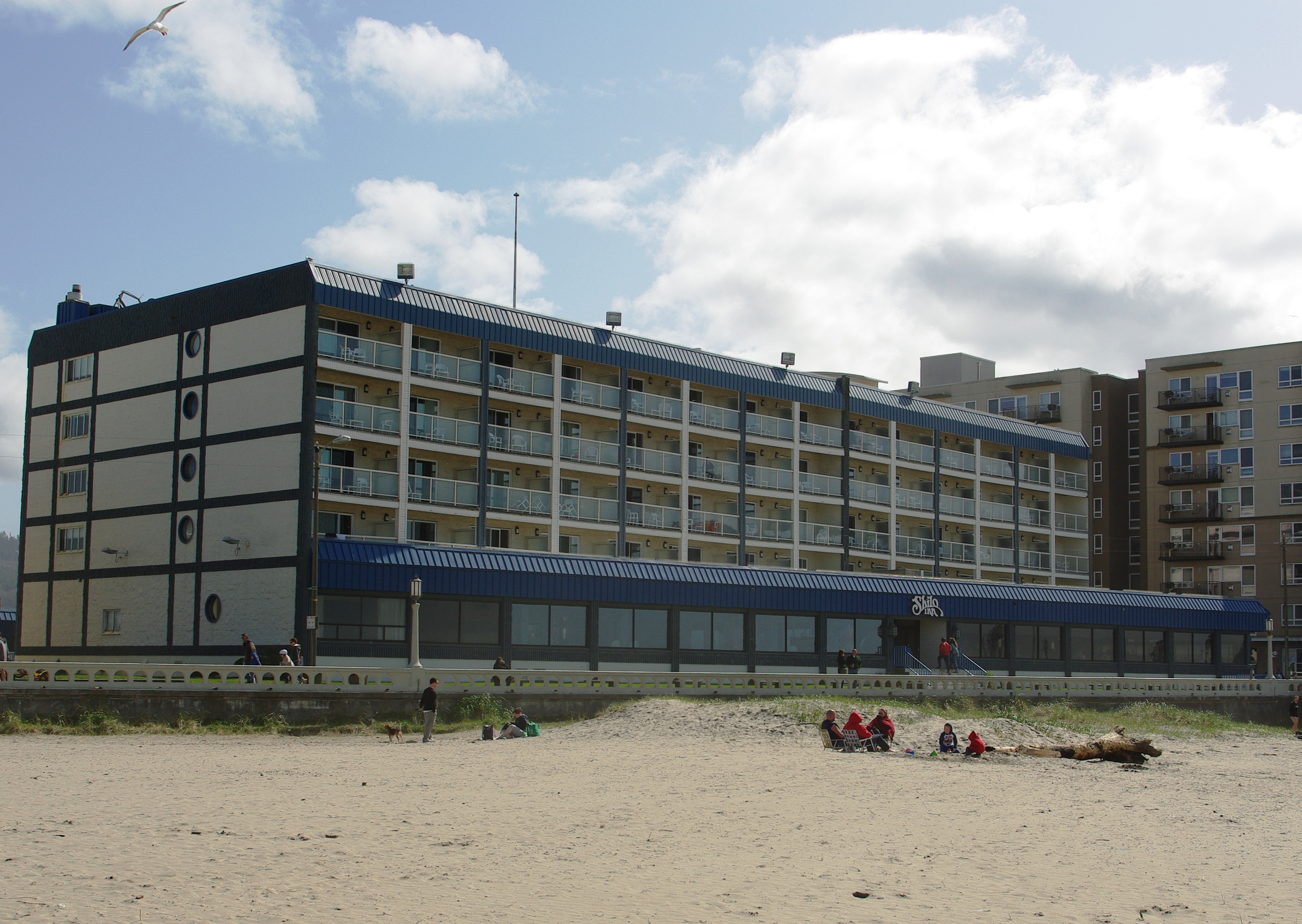
- Shilo Inns on the beach at Seaside, Oregon.
- Type: Private
- Industry: Hospitality
- Founded: 1974
- Founder: Mark Hemstreet
- Headquarters: Washington County, Oregon; United States; 45.51535°N 122.7961°W
- Number of locations: 4
- Area served: Western United States
- Products: Lodging
- Website: Shiloinns.com

Shilo Inns is a mid-priced hotel chain operating four hotels on the west coast of the United States (concentration in Oregon), and was once one of the largest independently owned and operated hotel companies in the Western United States.

== History ==
=== 1974: Launch ===
Shilo Inns was founded by Mark Hemstreet in 1974. Hemstreet was known for funding conservative political causes and candidates. The first location opened in Portland, Oregon, and by 2001 had expanded to include 47 locations. In 2000, it was announced that the hotel chain would be partnering, at least at some locations, with Elmer's restaurants (an equivalent to Denny's).

=== 2001 Crisis ===
The company began franchising locations in July 2001. In March 2002, 27 Shilo Inns filed for Chapter 11 bankruptcy, due to adverse effects on the travel industry stemming from the September 11 terrorist attacks. 27 of the company's 46 hotels were put under Chapter 11, and 13 of those were put up for sale.

On March 31, 2003, however, the company successfully emerged from bankruptcy. By June 2007, the company operated 43 hotels all located in the Western United States. In June 2007, the company named its CFO Christopher Campbell new CEO of Shilo Inns.

=== Locations downsizing ===
In 2014, the Salt Lake City location was sold to the Burgess Investment Group. In 2016, Shilo Inns was sentenced to pay $20 million worth of defaults on loan payments to the California Bank and Trust. The Coeur d'Alene location was sold in April 2017, and the Twin Falls location became a Holiday Inn in May 2018. The Richland waterfront location was sold in September 2018 and planned to be turned into Best Western SureStay Collection. In July 2019, the Bend location was put on auction sale after defaulting loan payments. The location in Medford has become a Red Roof Inn.

In 2019, the company installed a cloud-based sales and catering system throughout its locations. By 2000 the chain had grown to approximately 50 locations, but by February 2023 it was down to 18 hotels after many filed for bankruptcy.

== Description ==
Hotels are frequently two to three stories and of a gray and blue color scheme, although there are exceptions, such as their former property in Salt Lake City, which was a 13-story tan and gold hotel with red neon accents (now a Holiday Inn Express). Most properties feature swimming pools, spas, and saunas and all now feature free high speed internet and are dog friendly. Selected properties offer room service and a continental breakfast. Some also include a full service Shilo Restaurant, and hotels in Beaverton, Klamath Falls, and Portland, Oregon featured cigar bars prior to their closure.

== See also ==
- List of chained-brand hotels
