= U.S. Franchise Systems =

American hotel franchising company

- Type: Subsidiary
- Industry: Hospitality
- Founded: 1995; 31 years ago
- Founder: Mike Leven and Neal Aronson
- Defunct: 2008; 18 years ago
- Fate: Acquired by Wyndham Worldwide.
- Successor: Wyndham Worldwide
- Headquarters: Atlanta, Georgia, US
- Parent: Hyatt
- Subsidiaries: Microtel Inn and Suites; Hawthorn Suites

U.S. Franchise Systems was a franchise company that owned Microtel Inns and Suites and Hawthorn Suites. It was founded in 1995 by Michael A. Leven and his nephew Neal Aronson.

In March 1996, the company acquired the franchise rights to Hawthorn Suites, and acquired full ownership of the brand on March 12, 1998.

In 1998, U.S. Franchise Systems, Inc. announced that it has purchased Best Inns Suites. US Franchise Systems later sold the America's Best Inn (formerly Best Inns) chain to the Country Hearth Inns chain (since renamed America's Best Franchising Inc.) in 2005.

In 2000, the Pritzker family of Chicago, who owns Hyatt, purchased the company. By 2008, Hyatt had sold it to Wyndham Worldwide. Aronson left after the sale to Pritzker family in 2000. He formed Roark Capital Group. Leven retired in 2007.
