= H World Group Limited =

Chinese hotel management company

- Type: Public
- Traded as: Nasdaq: HTHT
- Industry: Hospitality Management
- Founded: 2005; 21 years ago
- Founder: Ji Qi
- Headquarters: Jiading District, Shanghai, China
- Subsidiaries: H World International

H World Group Limited (simplified Chinese: 华住酒店集团; traditional Chinese: 華住酒店集團; pinyin: Huázhù Jiǔdiàn Jítuán), formerly Huazhu Hotels Group in English, is a hotel management company in China. In 2010, H World Group was listed on Nasdaq; in September 2020, H World Group achieved a secondary listing on the Main Board of the Hong Kong Stock Exchange. In January 2023, H World was listed in the Hurun China 500 Most Valuable Private Companies 2022 and ranked No. 126. Its headquarters are in Jiading District, Shanghai.

As of September 2025, H World operates 12,702 hotels with 1,246,240 rooms globally, making it one of the world's largest hotel chains.

== History ==
In August 2005, the first HanTing Hotel was built. The first hotel of the group was opened by Kunshan Railway Station for a trial operation in August 2005. Ji Qi (Chinese: 季琦; pinyin: Jì Qí), the founder, stated that he got the idea to start the chain by reading a book discussing Accor.

In January 2010, the first JI Hotel was built. In March 2010, HanTing Hotel Group, Inc. went public on the New York Stock Exchange. In November 2012, the group's Chinese name was renamed to Huazhu Hotels Group.

In December 2014, signed a long-term strategic alliance agreement with Accor in France, which was finalized in January 2016. In May 2015, former president Jenny Zhang was appointed chief executive officer. In February 2017, the company wholly acquired Orange Crystal Hotel Group, which owns the brands Orange Crystal Hotel and Orange Hotel. In April 2017, the company opened the first Manxin Hotel.

In August 2018, Huazhu Hotels Group announced the completion of its strategic acquisition of the Chinese boutique resort hotel brand, Blossom. In October 2019, the first overseas directly managed shop of JI Hotel was officially opened in Singapore's historic Orchard Road shopping district, as the first overseas hotel of Huazhu Hotels Group. In November 2019, the company announced that one of their subsidiaries purchased Deutsche Hospitality for 700 million euros.

In January 2020, the company completed the acquisition of all equity interest in Deutsche Hospitality, whose hotel brands include Steigenberger, Steigenberger Icons, MAXX by Steigenberger, IntercityHotel and Zleep Hotels. In September 2020, the company achieved a secondary listing on the Main Board of the Hong Kong Stock Exchange under the ticker symbol 1179.HK.

In March 2021, Huazhu and Sunac Cultural and Tourism established a joint venture - Yongle Huazhu Hotel Management Company Limited - to jointly develop the high-end hotel business. In September 2022, the company changed its name to H World Group Limited, or H World.

== Corporate affairs ==
=== Structure ===
The group is composed of brands like HanTing Hotel, JI Hotel, Orange Hotel, Hi Inn Hotel, Joya Hotel, Blossom House, Madison International Hotel, Crystal Orange Hotel, Manxin Hotel, Madison Hotel, CitiGO Hotel, Starway Hotel, NiHao Hotel, CJIA Apartment and Suisse Place.

Under franchise agreements with Accor, 300 economy and middle-scale hotels have opened in China, mainly under the Ibis, Novotel, and Mercure brands.

China Lodging Holding Singapore, a wholly owned subsidiary of Huazhu Hotels Group, also acquired 100% equity interest in Deutsche Hospitality, which has since been rebranded to H World International and operates brands such as Steigenberger and IntercityHotel.

=== Financial results ===
Financial results
Year	2011	2012	2013	2014	2015	2016	2017	2018	2019	2020	2021	2022
Revenue (RMB, in millions)	2,249	3,224	4,168	4,965	5,775	6,573	8,229	10,063	11,212	10,196	12,785	13,862
Net Income (RMB, in millions)	114	175	280	307	437	774	1,228	716	1,769	(2,192)	（465）	（1,821）
