= Wyndham Garden =

International hotel chain

- Type: Subsidiary
- Industry: Hospitality
- Founded: 1998
- Headquarters: Parsippany, New Jersey
- Number of locations: 218 (December 2025)
- Parent: Wyndham Hotels & Resorts
- Website: www.wyndhamhotels.com/wyndham-garden

Wyndham Garden is an international upscale hotel chain and an upper-midscale subsidiary brand of Wyndham Hotels & Resorts. As of December 2025, the brand operates 218 properties globally. The chain offers full-service hotel accommodations targeting business and leisure travelers in suburban, airport, and city centre locations.

== Overview ==
Positioned within the upper-midscale segment of the global hospitality market, Wyndham Garden properties typically feature on-site restaurants, flexible meeting and banquet spaces, fitness centers, and business services. The brand serves as a bridge within Wyndham's portfolio between midscale limited-service lines and full-service luxury brands like Grand Wyndham.

In addition to traditional urban and suburban developments, the brand has expanded significantly in emerging commercial corridors and airport hubs across North America, Latin America, Europe, and Asia-Pacific.

== History ==
Wyndham Garden property located near Universal Studios in Orlando, Florida

Wyndham Garden in Dresden, Germany

The brand was introduced by Wyndham Hotel Group in 1998 as a specialized line designed for convenient, accessible lodging near major transportation corridors and secondary corporate centers. Over the 2010s and 2020s, Wyndham expanded the brand through strategic franchise development and regional expansions, particularly in high-growth markets across India, China, and Europe.

In 2018, following the spin-off of Wyndham Hotels & Resorts as an independent hotel franchising company from Wyndham Worldwide, Wyndham Garden became one of the core franchise brands managed under the unified corporate umbrella.

== Notable locations ==
- Wyndham Garden Munich Messe: A business-oriented hotel catering to the Munich Trade Fair grounds in Germany.
- Wyndham Garden Otay Mesa: Located near the US–Mexico border crossing in San Diego, California.
