= Neal Aronson =

American businessman (born 1965)

- Born: Neal Keith Aronson; 1965 (age 60–61)
- Education: Lehigh University
- Known for: Founder and managing partner, Roark Capital Group; Co-founder, U.S. Franchise Systems
- Spouse: Wendy L. Conrad
- Children: 3

Neal Keith Aronson (born 1965) is an American billionaire businessman, and the founder and managing partner of Roark Capital Group, a private equity firm.

== Education and career ==
Aronson earned a bachelor's degree from Lehigh University. He started his career in the corporate finance department of Drexel Burnham Lambert.

In 1995, together with his uncle, Mike Leven, a former president of Holiday Inn, he co-founded U.S. Franchise Systems, and expanded a regional chain of 27 hotels into the US's tenth-largest hotel franchisor with more than 1,100 properties before selling it to the Pritzker family's Hyatt Hotels in 2000 for $100 million, earning Aronson about $10 million.

In 2001, Aronson founded Roark Capital.

As of May 2025, Forbes estimated his net worth at US$4.1 billion.

== Personal life ==
Aronson is married to Wendy Conrad; they live in Atlanta, Georgia and have three children.
