= Hawthorn Suites =

American hotel chain

Hawthorn Suites Franchising Inc.
- Industry: Hotels
- Founded: 1983
- Founder: Hawthorn Realty Group
- Number of locations: 110 (December 31, 2018)
- Area served: United States, Canada
- Parent: Wyndham Hotels and Resorts
- Website: www.wyndhamhotels.com/hawthorn-extended-stay

Hawthorn Suites is a chain of hotels in the United States owned by Wyndham Hotels and Resorts.

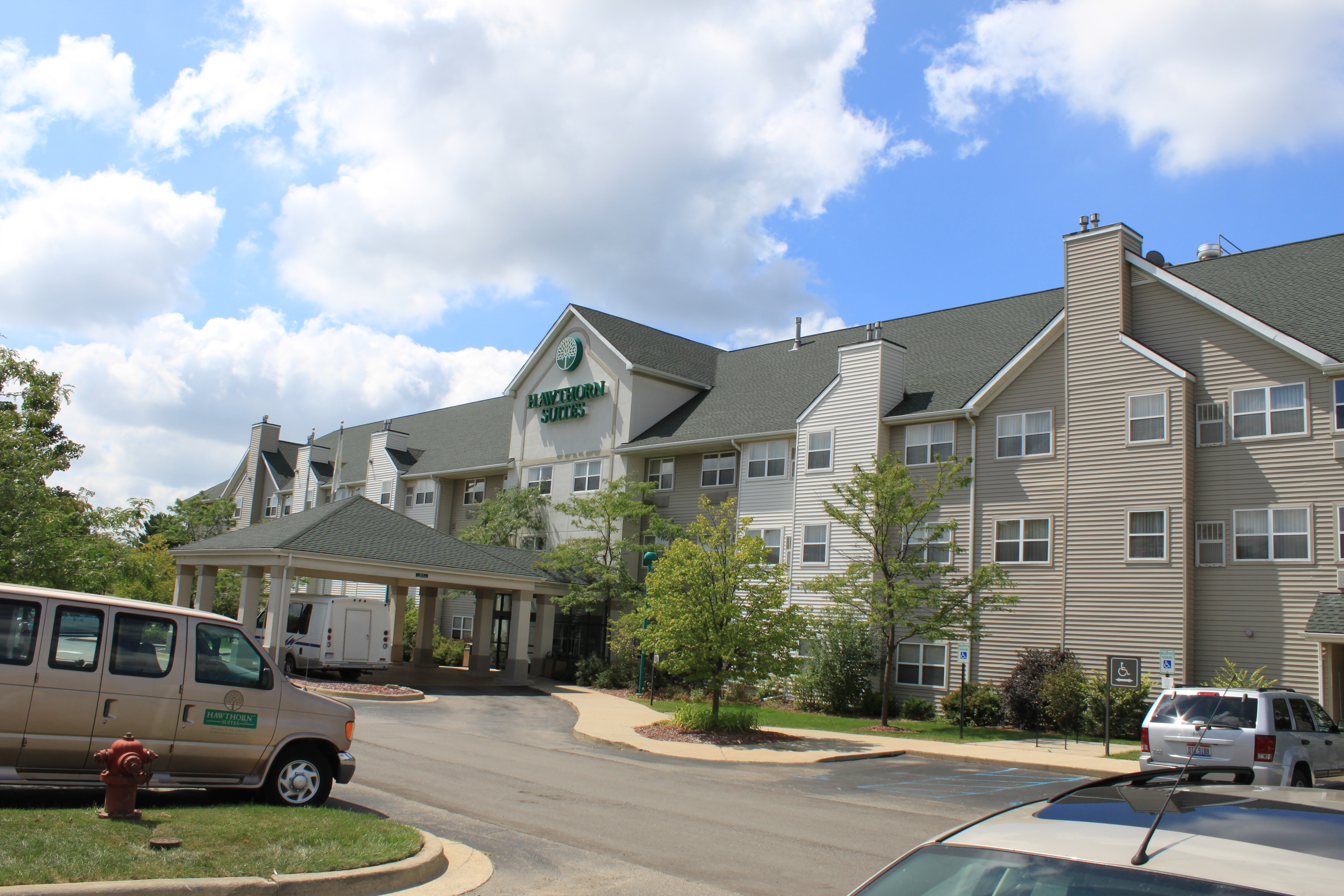
Hawthorn Suites, Ann Arbor, MI. This location has since become a Residence Inn.

Most Hawthorn Suites offer amenities such as meeting rooms, exercise facilities, swimming pools, and a free hot buffet breakfast and dinner. It competes with Hilton's Homewood Suites, Hyatt's Hyatt House, Marriott's Residence Inn, and InterContinental's Staybridge Suites in the upper moderate to low upscale segment of the extended-stay market. Since Hawthorn is not an entirely exclusive extended-stay brand, however, it may also compete with Marriott's SpringHill Suites and Comfort Suites in the non-extended-stay, all-suite segment of the market. As of December 31, 2018, it has 110 properties with 10,633 rooms.

== History ==
The chain was founded in 1983 in Austin, Texas by Hawthorn Property Group, a real estate company based in Chicago, Illinois. The chain's first properties were in and around Austin, with two of them having been acquired from the Austin-based Brookhollow chain in 1985. It was acquired in 1986 by the Pritzker family, owners of Hyatt at the time. The brand grew from 10 hotels to 17 during the Pritzkers' ownership. In 1996 the Pritzkers signed an agreement with US Franchise Systems, Inc. granting all franchising rights for Hawthorn Suites to USFS. In early 1998 USFS purchased Hawthorn completely from the Pritzker family and continued to grow the brand at a rapid pace, reaching over 100 hotels. In November 2000 Hawthorn Suites' parent company, US Franchise Systems, was purchased by business interests of the Pritzker family. On July 21, 2008, Wyndham Hotels and Resorts purchased US Franchise Systems, Inc., owner of the Microtel Inns and Hawthorn Suites brands for $150 million. US Franchise Systems had previously sold the America's Best Inn (formerly Best Inns) chain to the Country Hearth Inns chain to brothers Mike and R. C. Patel (since renamed America's Best Franchising Inc.) in 2005.

As of September 2009, there are approximately 80 Hawthorn Suites locations and the brand continues to expand both around the country and worldwide.
