= H World International =

Hotel chain company

- Type: GmbH
- Founded: 1930
- Headquarters: Frankfurt, Germany
- Key people: Stephan Hungeling (CEO); Choon Wah Wong (CFO); Mario von Hoesslin (COO)
- Revenue: 829.3 m EUR (2019)
- Owner: H World Group Limited
- Website: int.hworld.com

H World International, formerly branded Deutsche Hospitality and Steigenberger Hotel Group, is the German subsidiary of the Chinese H World Group Limited (formerly Huazhu Hotels). It operates hotels under several brands, including Steigenberger, IntercityHotel and Zleep Hotels.

== History ==
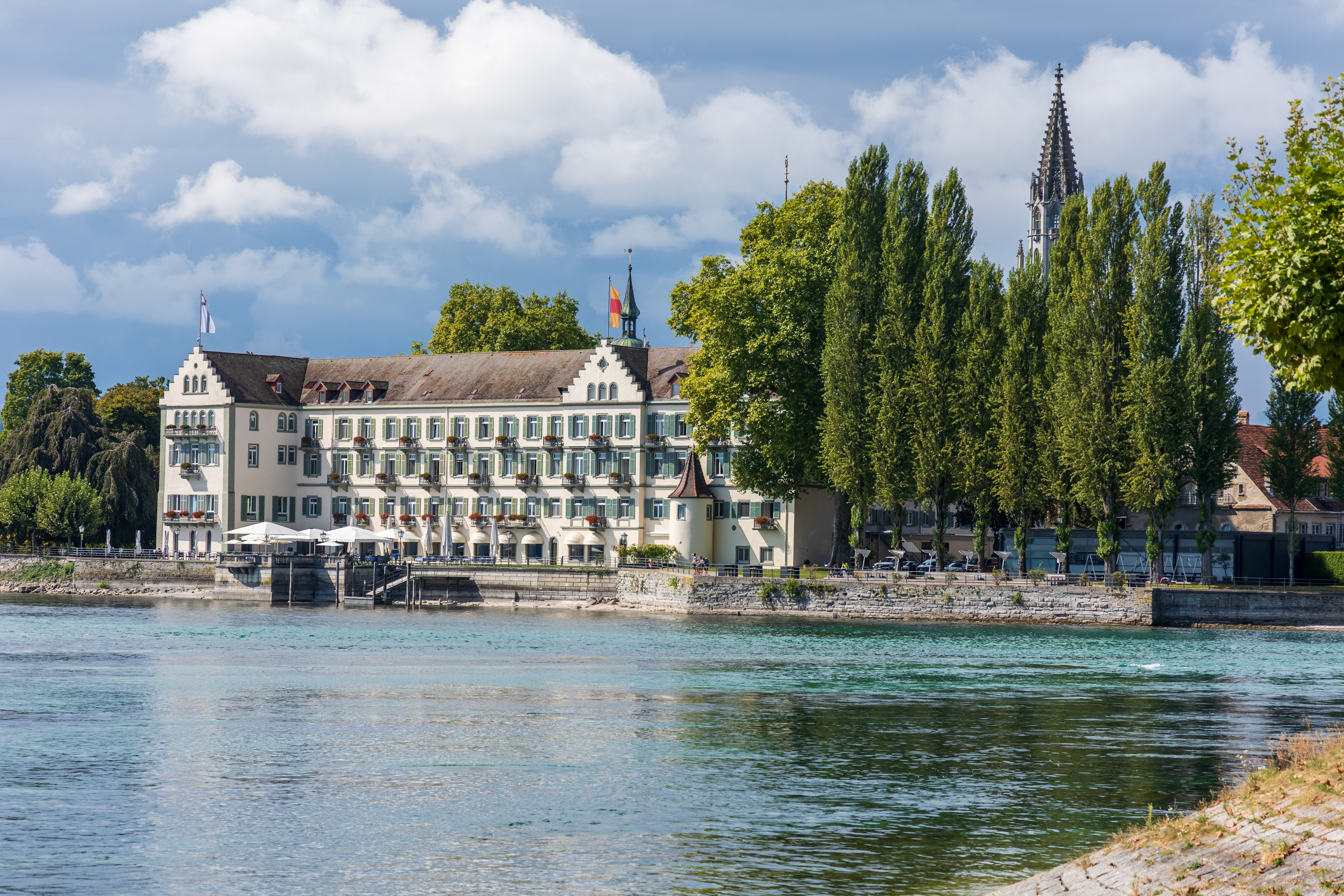
Steigenberger in Konstanz

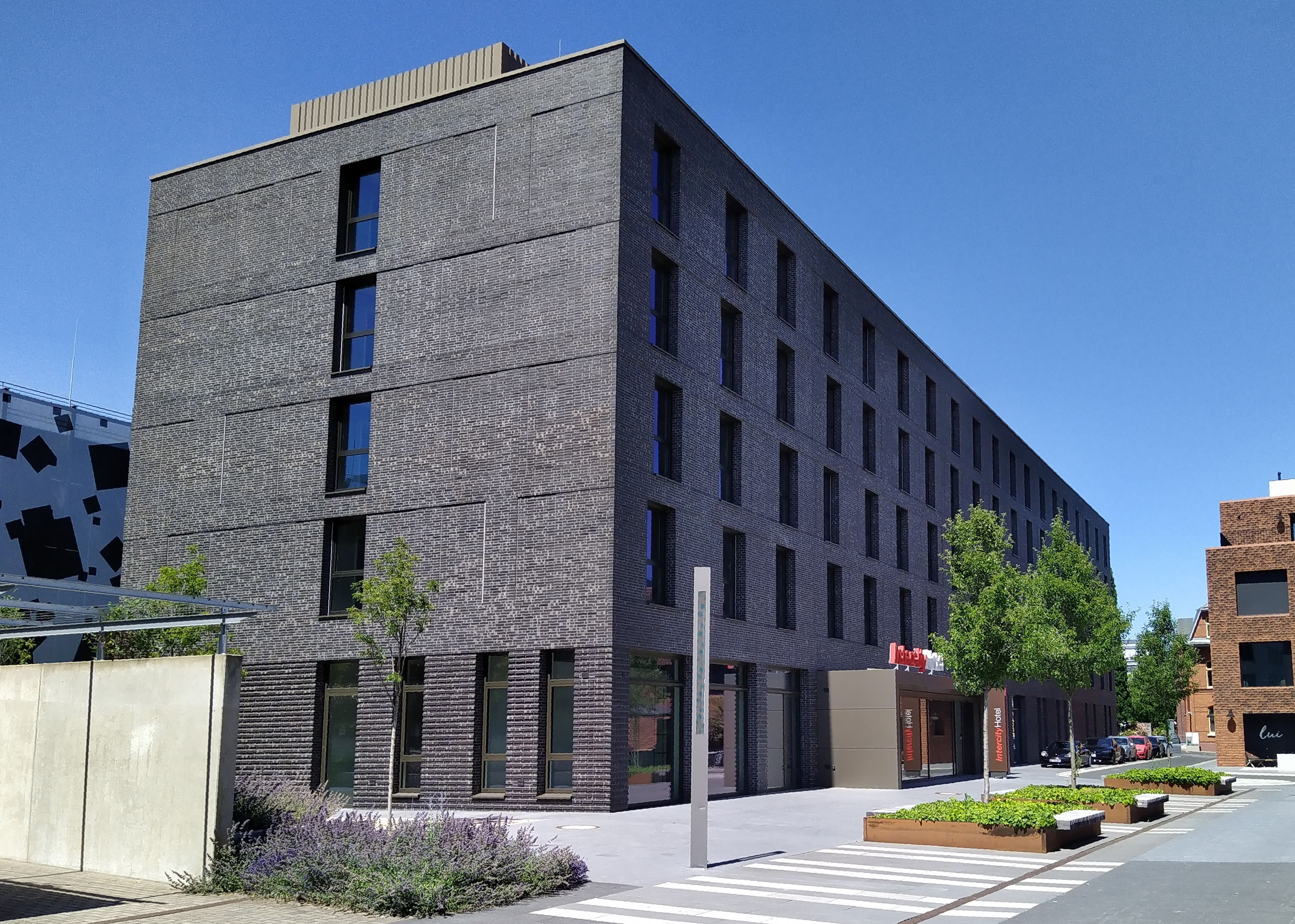
IntercityHotel in Herford

Albert Steigenberger, a merchant, acquired his first hotel, the Europäischer Hof in Baden-Baden, in 1930. In 1940, he purchased the Frankfurter Hof in Frankfurt am Main, which was partly destroyed in an air raid in 1944. The hotel reopened in 1948 with an initial 20 beds and resumed full operations five years later.

Between 1949 and 1958, Steigenberger acquired six further hotels. After his death in 1958, his son Egon Steigenberger assumed management of the company.

Egon Steigenberger died in 1985. The company was converted into a stock corporation, with the Steigenberger family holding 99.6% of the shares. The hotel chain was managed by his widow, Anne-Marie Steigenberger. His daughters Bettina, Christina and Claudia Steigenberger also joined the business, while his son Albert Steigenberger Jr. had his inheritance paid out.

In mid-1989, the company and Deutsche Bundesbahn announced that they would jointly operate the IntercityHotels through IntercityHotel GmbH, which had already been established in late 1987. As part of the arrangement, Steigenberger acquired a 49% stake in the company, which had previously been wholly owned by Deutsche Bundesbahn. Today IntercityHotel GmbH is a subsideray of Steigenberger Hotels GmbH.

In 2009, the Egyptian travel and tourism company Travco Group acquired Steigenberger Hotels. In 2016, the company was rebranded as Deutsche Hospitality. On 4 November 2019, it was announced that the Chinese Huazhu Hotels Group through one of their subsidiaries had purchased Deutsche Hospitality for 700 million Euro.

In 2024, Deutsche Hospitality announced a rebranding and name change to H World International, paralleling the rebranding of its parent from Huazhu Hotels to H World Group Limited.

== Brands and locations ==
H World International manages and operates more than 100 hotels in Europe, North Africa and the Middle East under the following brands:

- Steigenberger Hotels & Resorts
- Steigenberger Icons
- IntercityHotel
- Jaz in the City
- MAXX
- Zleep Hotels
