= TRYP by Wyndham =

Hotel chain

TRYP by Wyndham Tryp Worldwide Inc.
- Type: Subsidiary
- Industry: Hospitality
- Number of locations: 54 (2023)
- Parent: Wyndham Hotels & Resorts; Meliá Hotels International
- Website: www.wyndhamhotels.com/tryp

TRYP by Wyndham (formerly branded as TRYP) is a brand of independently owned hotels and a subsidiary of Wyndham Hotels & Resorts.

== History ==
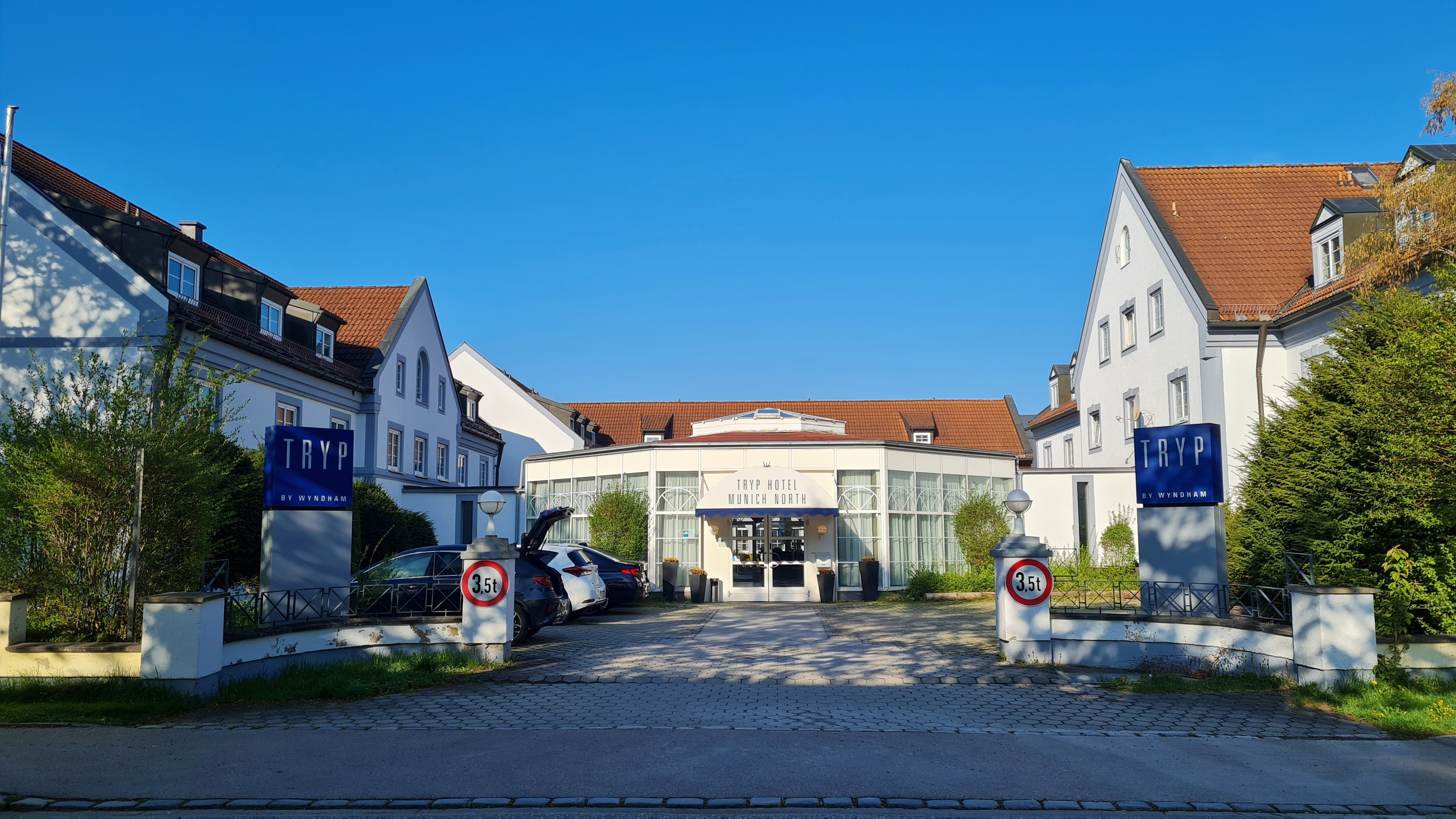
TRYP by Wyndham near Munich

Wyndham acquired TRYP in 2010, and has been promoting the brand internationally. As of December 31, 2023, it had 54 properties with 6,862 rooms. The brand is hosted by Spanish chain Mélia in Europe.
