= Vivanta Coimbatore =

Five-star hotel in Tamil Nadu, India

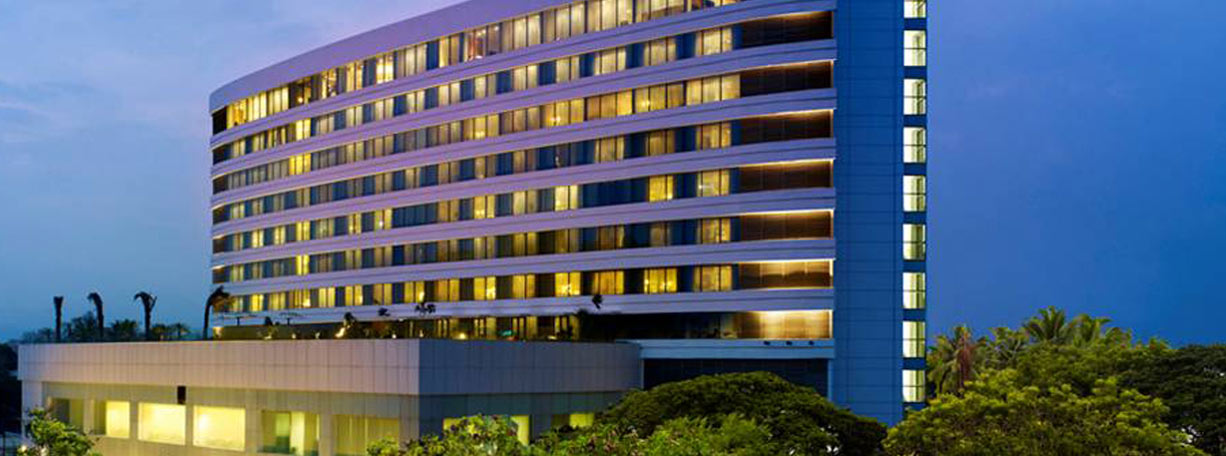
- Hotel chain: Taj Hotels

General information
- Location: Coimbatore, India, 105 Race Course Road, Coimbatore, Tamil Nadu
- Coordinates: 11.002238°N 76.973705°E
- Operator: Taj Hotels

Technical details
- Floor count: 9

Other information
- Number of rooms: 180

Vivanta Coimbatore, previously known as Taj Surya, is a five-star hotel in Coimbatore, Tamil Nadu, India. It is a 9-storied hotel, one of the tallest star hotels in Coimbatore. The hotel is located on Race Course Road in Gopalapuram. It is used by both business travelers and tourists. Taj Surya Hotel have close proximity to airport and railway stations since its location is in the downtown central business district region. The establishment of this hotel led to add contribution the city's development.

It is one of the largest hotels in Coimbatore as well as the first Taj Hotel of Coimbatore. The hotel is 15-minute walk from Jawaharlal Nehru Stadium, 2 km from Coimbatore Junction railway station and 17 km from Coimbatore Golf Club.

== History ==
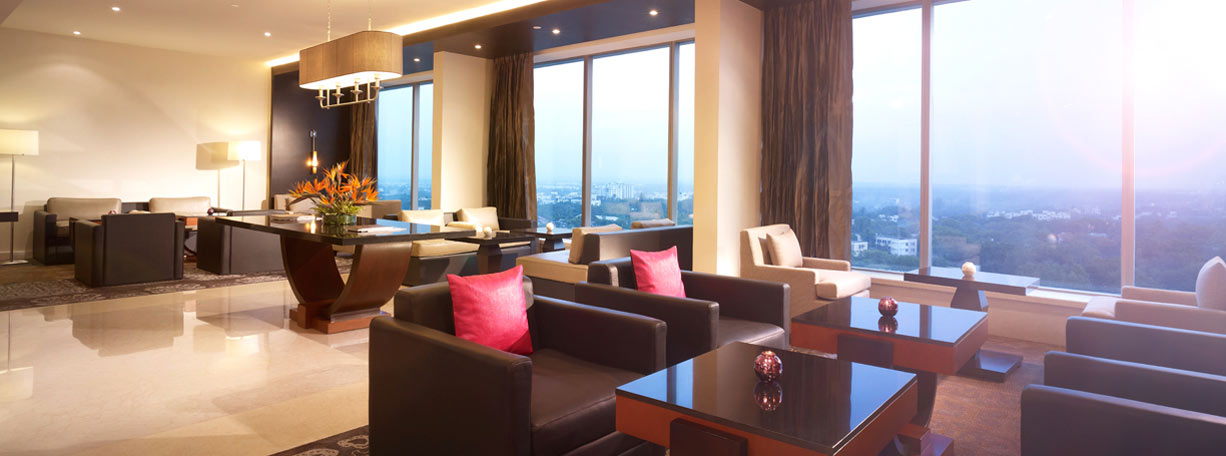
Guest hall at hotel

Before this hotel, there was another five star hotel called Surya International Hotel at the same location. It had about 45 rooms. That hotel also had all the features and amenities of the five star hotels. Several years later the old Surya International Hotel was demolished and a new hotel was constructed by the Taj Hotels, a hotel chain owned by Indian Hotels Company Limited. The hotel was opened as Taj Surya and later it was renamed as Vivanta Coimbatore.

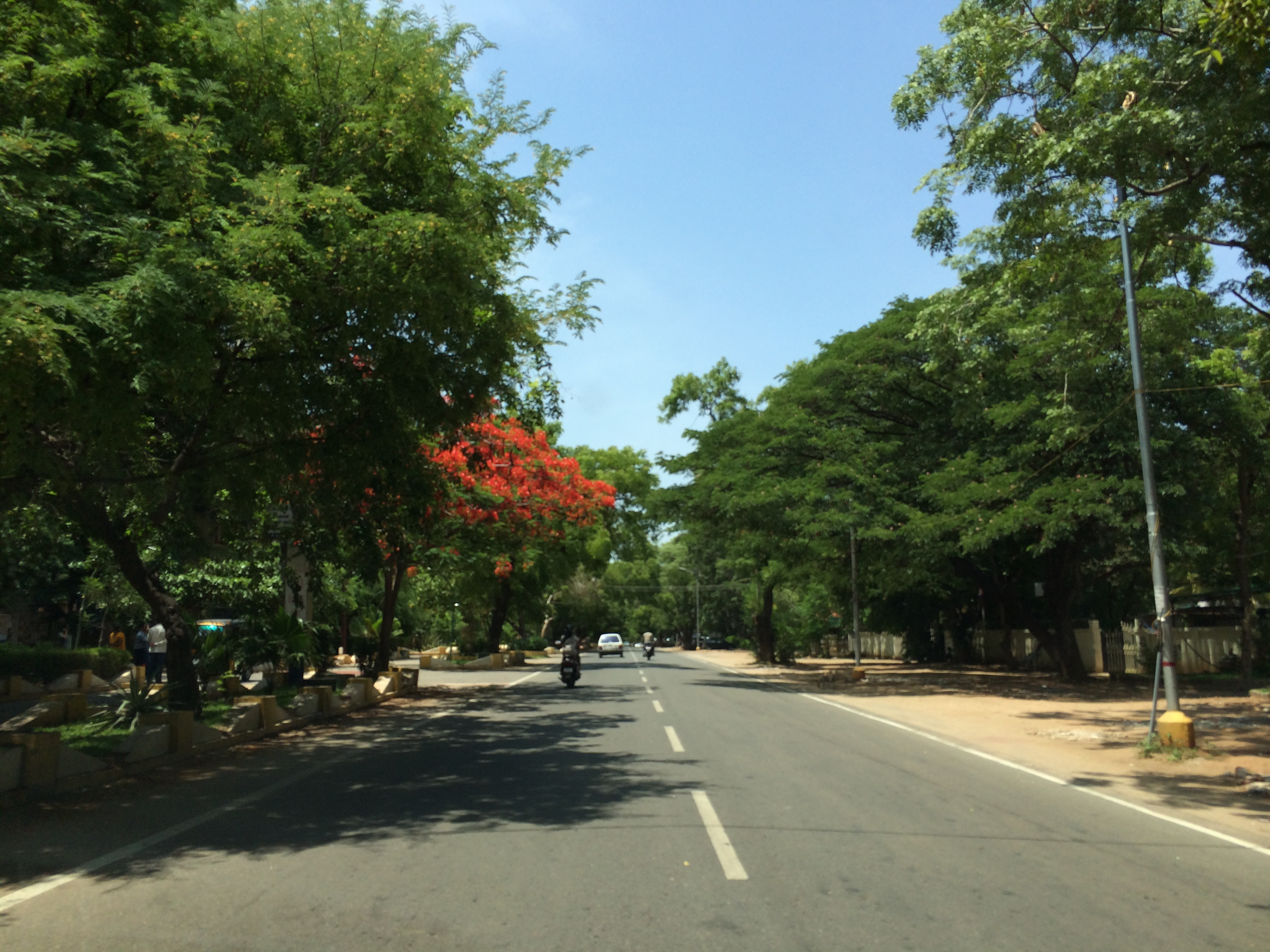
Race Course Road — the location of Vivanta Coimbatore

== Location ==
Located right in the heart of KG Cinema Hall, the hotel is 1 km from Coimbatore Junction and 9.5 km from Coimbatore International Airport. Landmarks near the hotel include Nehru Stadium, Government Museum Coimbatore, Brookefields Mall, Siruvani Waterfalls and Monkey Falls. TIDEL Park Coimbatore is at a distance of 7.5 km.

== Gallery ==
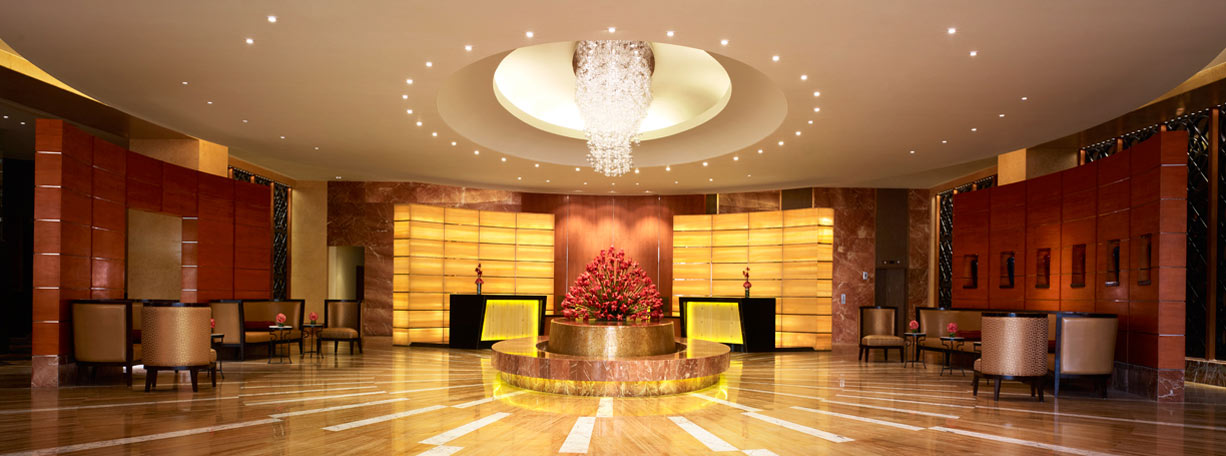
Reception hall of the hotel

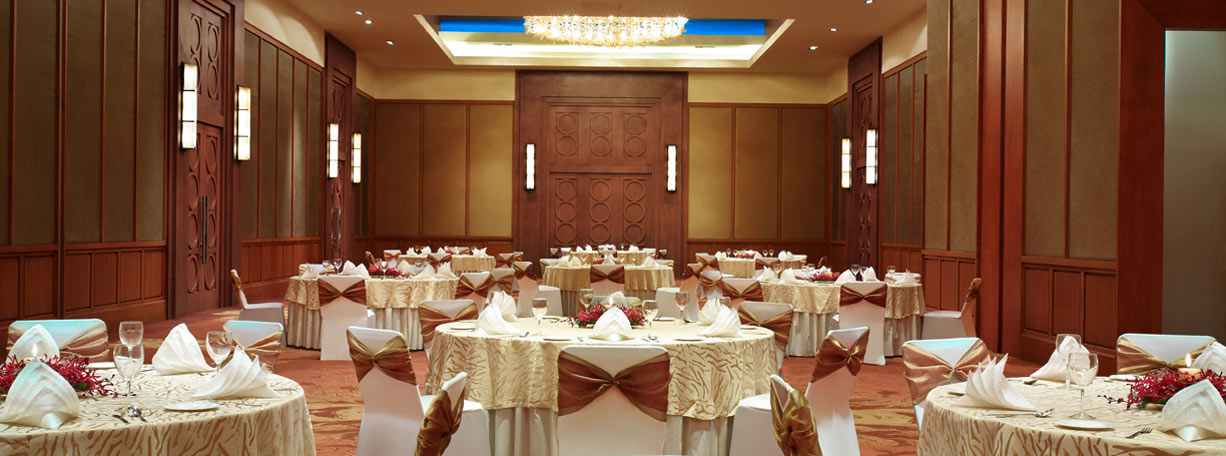
Dining hall at Taj Surya

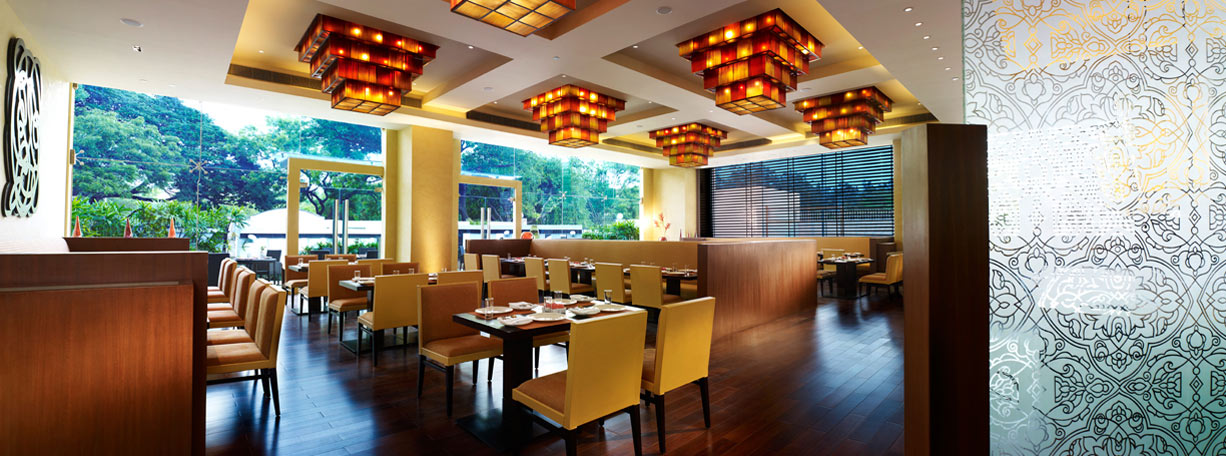
Second dining hall at the hotel
