= Dolce Hotels and Resorts =

American hotel chain

Dolce Hotels and Resorts Dolce International Inc.
- Industry: Hospitality
- Founded: 1981; 45 years ago
- Headquarters: Houston, Texas
- Number of locations: 20 (December 31, 2018)
- Parent: Wyndham Hotels & Resorts
- Website: www.dolce.com

Dolce Hotels and Resorts is a brand of independently owned hotels by Wyndham Hotels & Resorts that targets business travelers. The brand touts easy navigation for meeting planners as well as other business clients. Wyndham acquired Dolce in 2015, and has been promoting the brand internationally. Dolce manages major, historic properties. As of December 31, 2018, it had 20 properties with 4,024 rooms.
