= Ruby Hotels =

Chain of hotels founded in Germany in 2013

- Industry: Hospitality
- Founded: 2013 in Germany
- Founder: Michael Struck
- Number of locations: 22
- Area served: Europe
- Owner: IHG Hotels & Resorts
- Website: www.ruby-hotels.com/en

Ruby Hotels is a European based hotel chain, opening its first hotel in 2013 in Germany, with 22 operating across Europe in 2026.

Ruby Hotels was founded by Michael Struck and is based on a "lean luxury" concept with a mix of new build and reconfiguration of existing buildings such as old offices and retail.

In February 2025, IHG Hotels & Resorts acquired Ruby Hotels for €110.5 million. and fully merged into the IHG by spring 2026. Each hotel property remained independently operated and becomes a franchise of IHG.

The hotels are all named with female names. Struck was inspired by existing hotels such as Citizen M and Yotel when developing the Ruby concept.
