= Vivanta =

Indian hotel chain

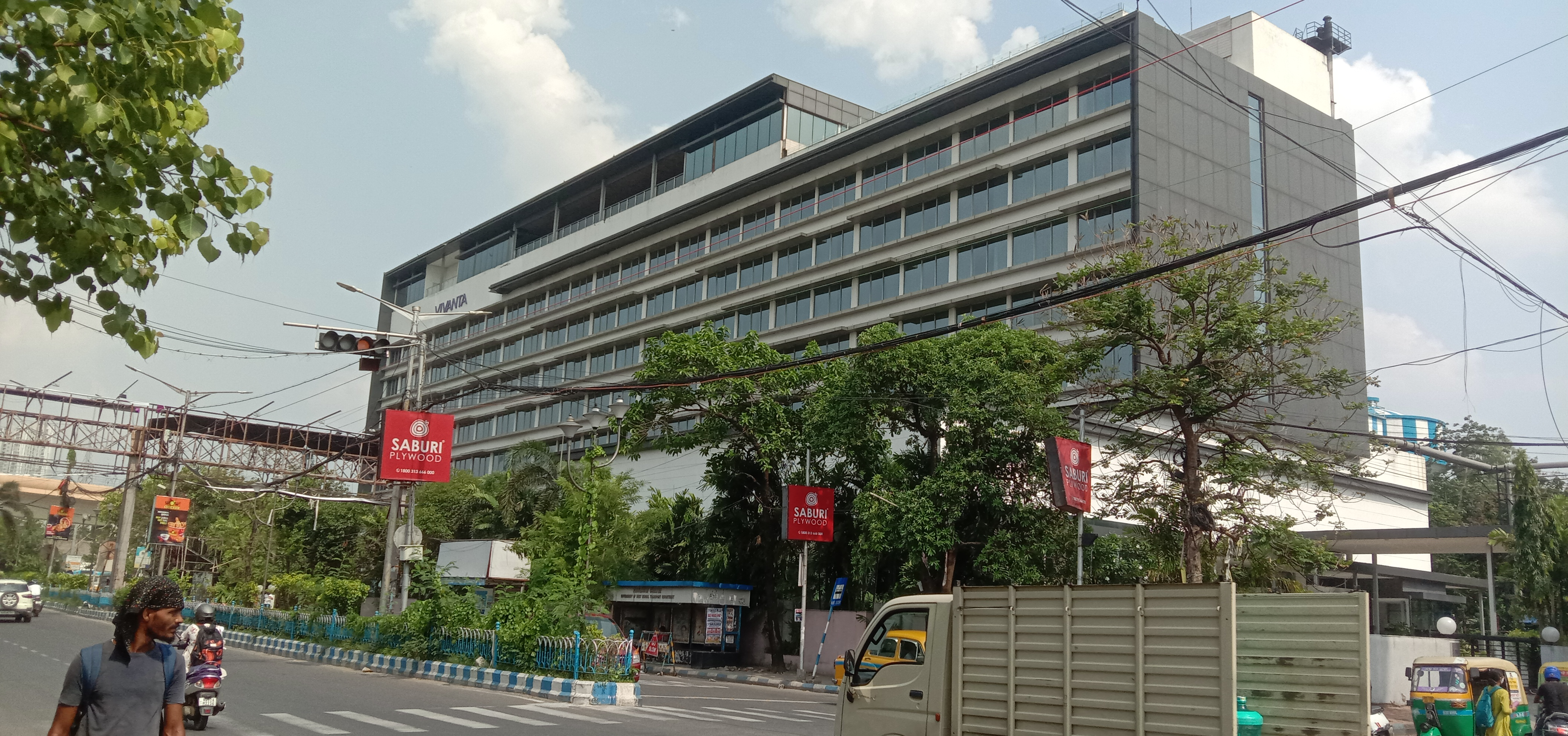
- A Vivanta hotel in Kolkata
- Type: Private
- Industry: Hotels
- Founded: September 2010; 15 years ago
- Number of locations: 30
- Area served: India, Indonesia, Malaysia, Thailand, Vietnam, Philippines, Taiwan, South Korea, Mongolia, Kazakhstan, Japan and Israel
- Key people: Natarajan Chandrasekaran (chairman); Puneet Chhatwal (MD & CEO)
- Parent: Indian Hotels Company Limited
- Website: vivantahotels.com

Vivanta is an Indian hotel chain established in September 2010. The brand is a part of the Indian Hotels Company Limited, a subsidiary of the TATA Group.

== History ==
The brand was established as part of The Indian Hotels Company Limited with it being rolled over to 19 of its existing hotels. The brand was established to complement their previous launch of The Gateway hotels.
