= Ginger Hotels =

Indian budget hotel chain

- Formerly: INDI-ONE hotels
- Type: Subsidiary
- Industry: Hotels
- Founded: 2004; 22 years ago
- Headquarters: Mumbai, India
- Number of locations: 85+
- Area served: India
- Key people: Deepika Rao (chairperson); Jithin Prakash (Head Finance)
- Parent: Indian Hotels Company Limited
- Website: www.gingerhotels.com

Ginger Hotels is an Indian midscale hotel chain brand owned by Indian Hotels Company Limited (IHCL), a subsidiary of the Tata Group. IHCL operates 70+ Ginger hotels in 47 pin codes across India.

== History ==
The first ginger hotel was opened in Whitefield, Bangalore in June 2004.

The hotels' modernised design was first introduced in its Panaji, Goa property.

== See also ==
- Indian Hotels Company Limited
- Tata Group
