= Zleep Hotels =

Danish budget hotel chain

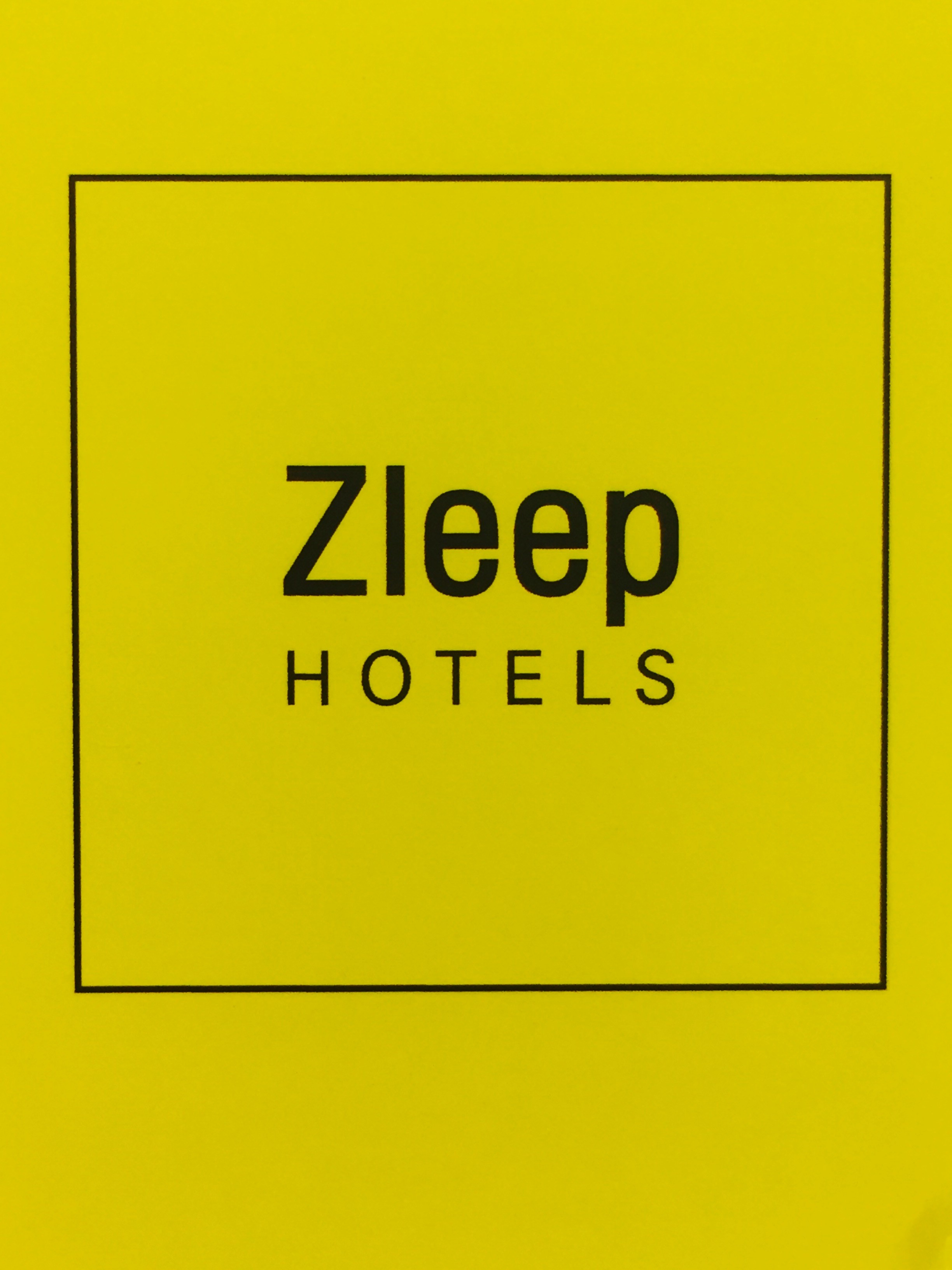
- Company type: Private
- Industry: Hospitality
- Founded: 2003
- Founder: Peter Haber
- Headquarters: Frankfurt, Germany
- Number of locations: 5
- Number of employees: 120+
- Parent: H World International (2019-present)
- Website: zleep.com

Zleep Hotels is a chain of budget hotels originated from Copenhagen, Denmark with headquarters in Frankfurt am Main, Germany. It was founded in 2003 by Peter Haber and currently is a subsidiary of H World International. The chain consists of currently five three-star hotels located in Spain, Germany, Czech Republic and Switzerland.

== History ==
Zleep Hotels was founded in 2003 by Peter Haaber, Knud Larsen and former HORESTA chairman Egon Klitgaard via the company Nordic Hotel Management. The three partners knew each other from Scandic Hotels. The company was initially headquartered in the same building as its first hotel in Kastrup but moved to larger premises in Avedøre in 2003.

Zleep Hotels became a member of the European Hotelstars Union in 2017. Core Hospitality, a sister company of Zleep Hotels, was established as a Nordic white label brand independent hotel operator in 2017. It also is the operator of the first Moxy Hotels location in Copenhagen which opened in the city's South Harbour district in 2018.

In 2024, Zleep Hotels signed an agreement with Marriott International, rebranding all 14 Zleep Hotels locations within Denmark to the Marriott brand Four Points Flex by Sheraton. Shortly after, founder Peter Haber sold all rights on the Zleep Hotels brand to H World International.

== Hotels ==
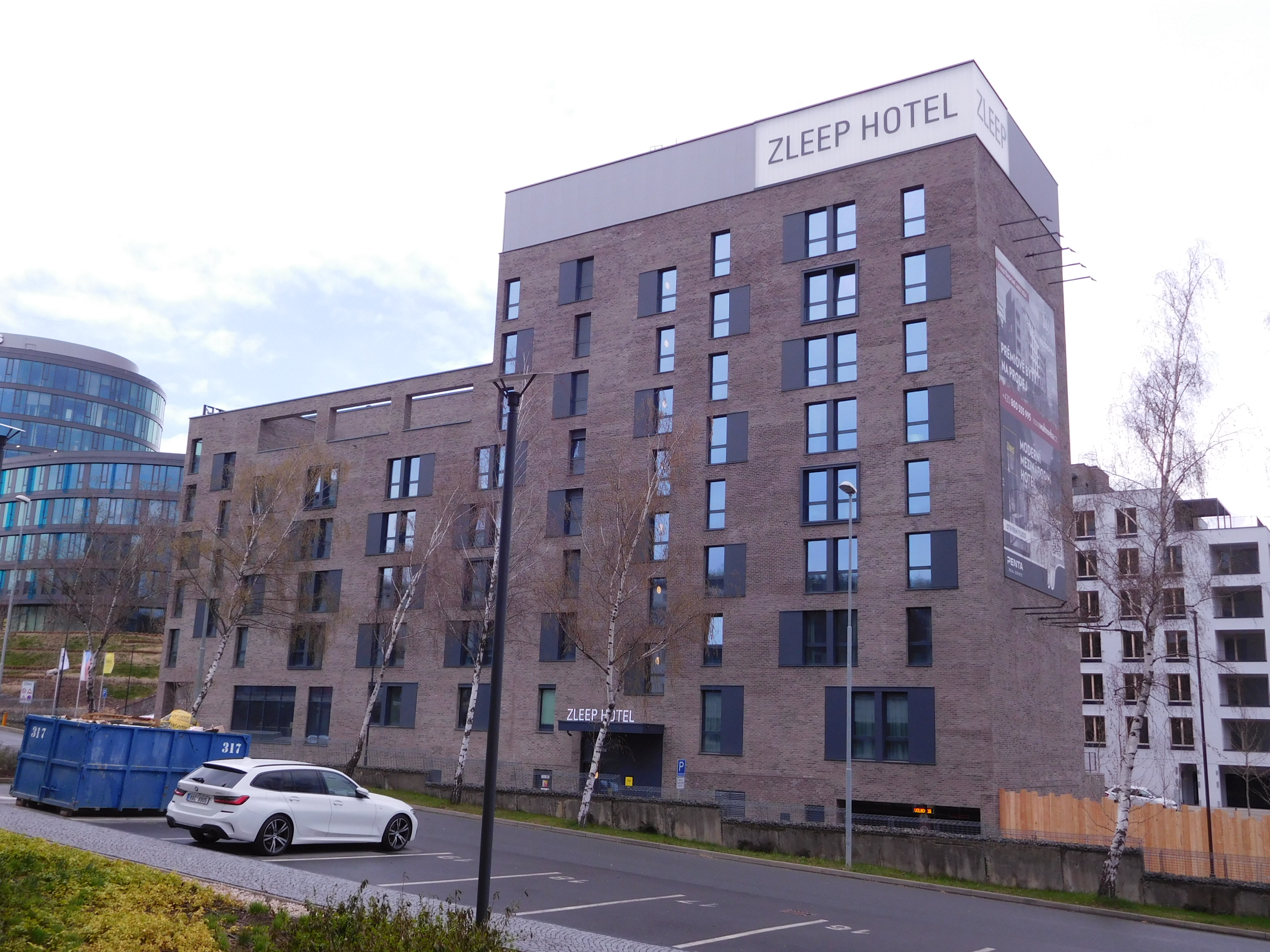
Zleep Hotel in Prague

As of 2025, after the rebranding of all Danish locations, Zleep Hotels operates properties in Madrid, Prague, Frankfurt am Main (Kelsterbach), Zurich and Lausanne (Chavannes).
