= Magnuson Act =

Magnuson Act most commonly refers to the following legislation named after Warren Magnuson:

- Chinese Exclusion Repeal Act, a 1943 United States federal law that repealed the Chinese Exclusion Act
- Magnuson Act of 1950 (46 U.S.C. § 70051), a United States federal law that amended the Espionage Act
- Magnuson-Moss Warranty Act, a 1975 United States federal law governing consumer warranties
- Magnuson–Stevens Fishery Conservation and Management Act, a 1976 United States federal law governing fisheries
