= Magnuson Hotels =

Hotel chain

- Company type: Private
- Industry: Lodging
- Founded: 2003
- Founder: Tom and Melissa Magnuson
- Headquarters: London UK, Spokane, Washington, U.S.
- Number of locations: 2000+
- Area served: United States, United Kingdom
- Services: Lodging

Magnuson Hotels is a hotel conversion brand in the US, UK and Europe with over 2,000 hotels. It was founded at the world's first independent hotel chain.

Founded in 2003 by Thomas and Melissa Magnuson. In 2006, Magnuson Hotels introduced three hotel brands serving the upper midscale, midscale and economy segments; ultimately the largest customer segments globally. In 2022, Magnuson Hotel Franchising was introduced, with two brand segments (midscale and upper midscale).

Thomas Magnuson stepped down as CEO in 2023 and Adnan Malik was promoted to the role (from Chief Revenue Officer).
