= Microtel Inn and Suites =

Chain of hotels

Microtel by Wyndham Microtel Inns & Suites Franchising, Inc.
- Type: Subsidiary
- Industry: Hotels
- Founded: 1989
- Number of locations: 360 (December 31, 2025)
- Area served: Worldwide
- Parent: Wyndham Hotels and Resorts
- Website: wyndhamhotels.com/microtel

Microtel by Wyndham is a brand of Wyndham Hotels and Resorts for franchise hotels.

== History ==
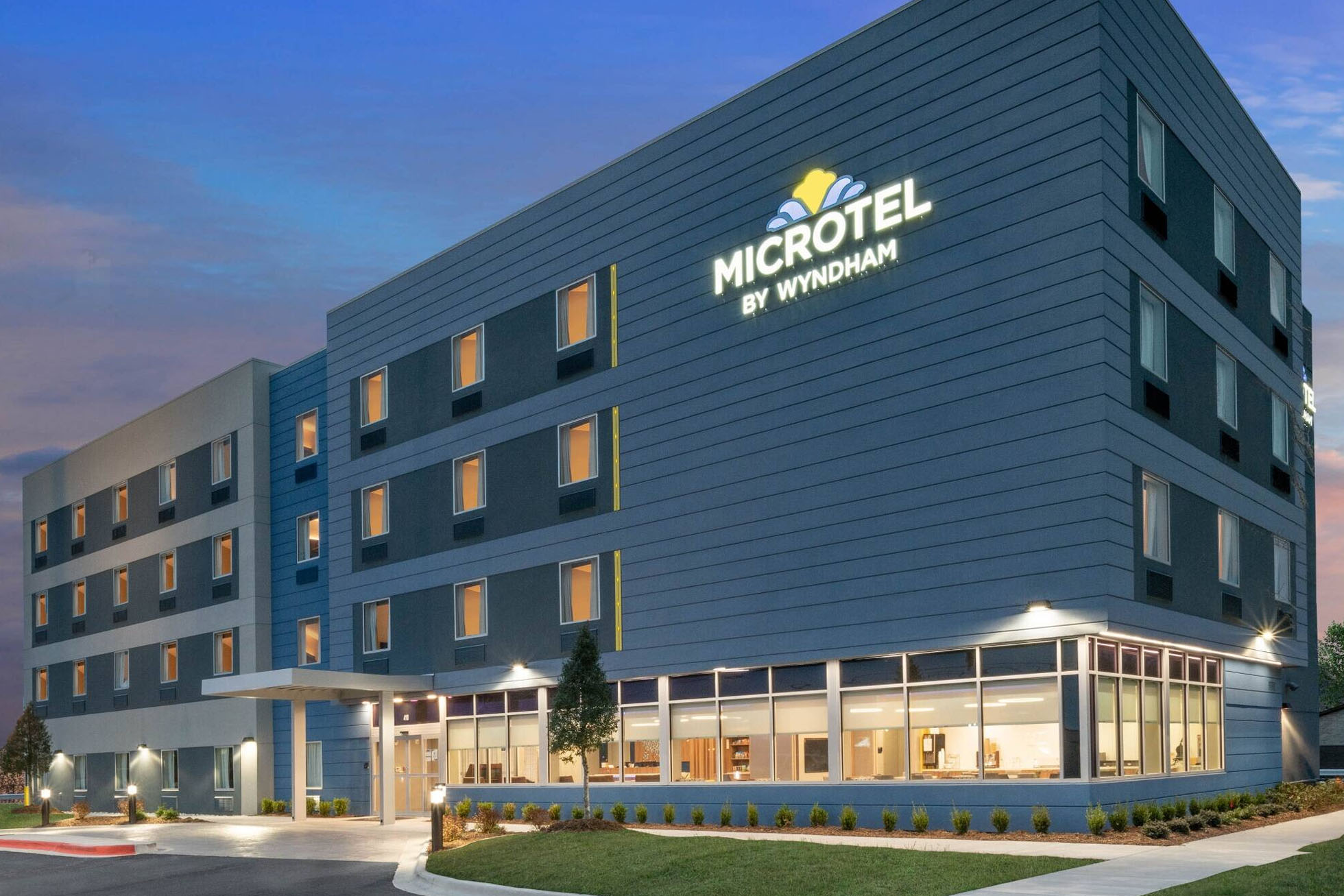
Moda Prototype Exterior

The first location opened in 1989 in suburban Rochester, New York. by developer Loren Ansley. There are now over three hundred properties around the world.

On July 21, 2008, Wyndham Hotels and Resorts purchased US Franchise Systems, Inc., owner of the Microtel Inn & Suites and Hawthorn Suites brands, from Global Hyatt. US Franchise Systems had previously sold the America's Best Inn (formerly Best Inns) chain to the Country Hearth Inns chain in 2005. That holding company is now known as America's Best Franchising Inc.

As of 2012, Microtel's logo had been changed to match the corporate design of Wingate by Wyndham and Hawthorn Suites, both owned by Wyndham Hotels and Resorts.

== Properties ==
Microtel by Wyndham maintains 360 locations with 27,561 rooms as of December 31, 2025. The company has locations in Argentina, Canada, Mexico, the Philippines, New Zealand, and the United States.

== Development ==
In 2019, Wyndham introduced a new Microtel prototype known as Moda, designed to improve construction efficiency and operational flexibility for franchise owners. The prototype includes updated room layouts, public spaces, and exterior design elements.
