= Hampton Inn =

American hotel chain

Hampton by Hilton
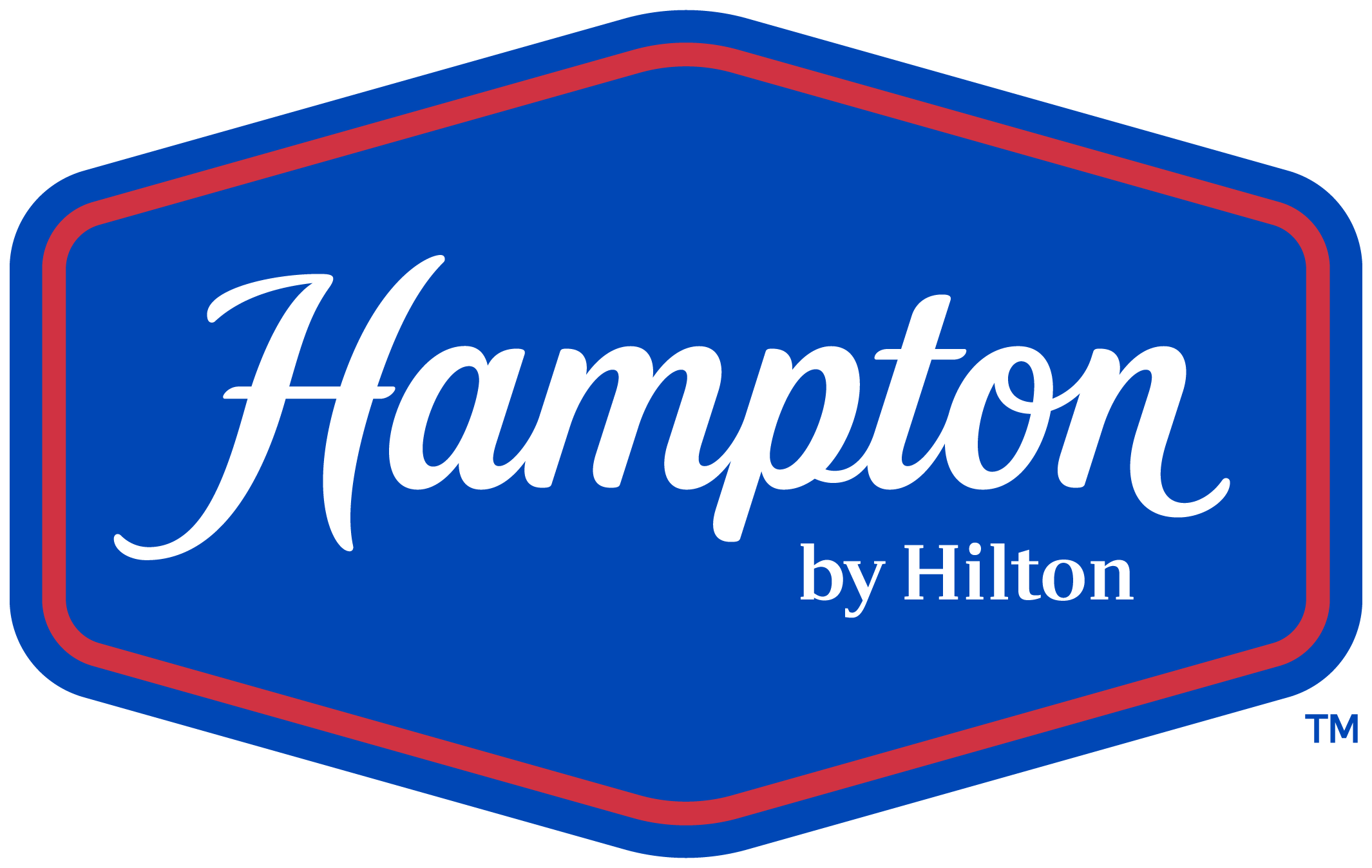
- Type: Subsidiary
- Industry: Hospitality
- Founded: 1984; 42 years ago in Memphis, Tennessee, US
- Founder: Holiday Inn
- Headquarters: Memphis, Tennessee, US
- Number of locations: 3,000 (March 26, 2024)
- Area served: North America; Latin America; Europe; Central Asia; Africa
- Parent: Holiday Inn (1984–1994); Promus Hotel Corporation (1994–1999); Hilton Worldwide (1999–present)
- Website: hampton.com

Hampton Inn, now officially branded as Hampton by Hilton, is an American chain of hotels trademarked by Hilton Worldwide. The Hampton hotel brand is a chain of moderately priced, budget to midscale limited service hotels with limited food and beverage facilities. Most Hampton hotels are independently owned and operated by franchisees, though a few are managed by Hilton. As of March 2024, the Hampton franchise includes 3,000 hotels in 40 countries and territories.

== History ==
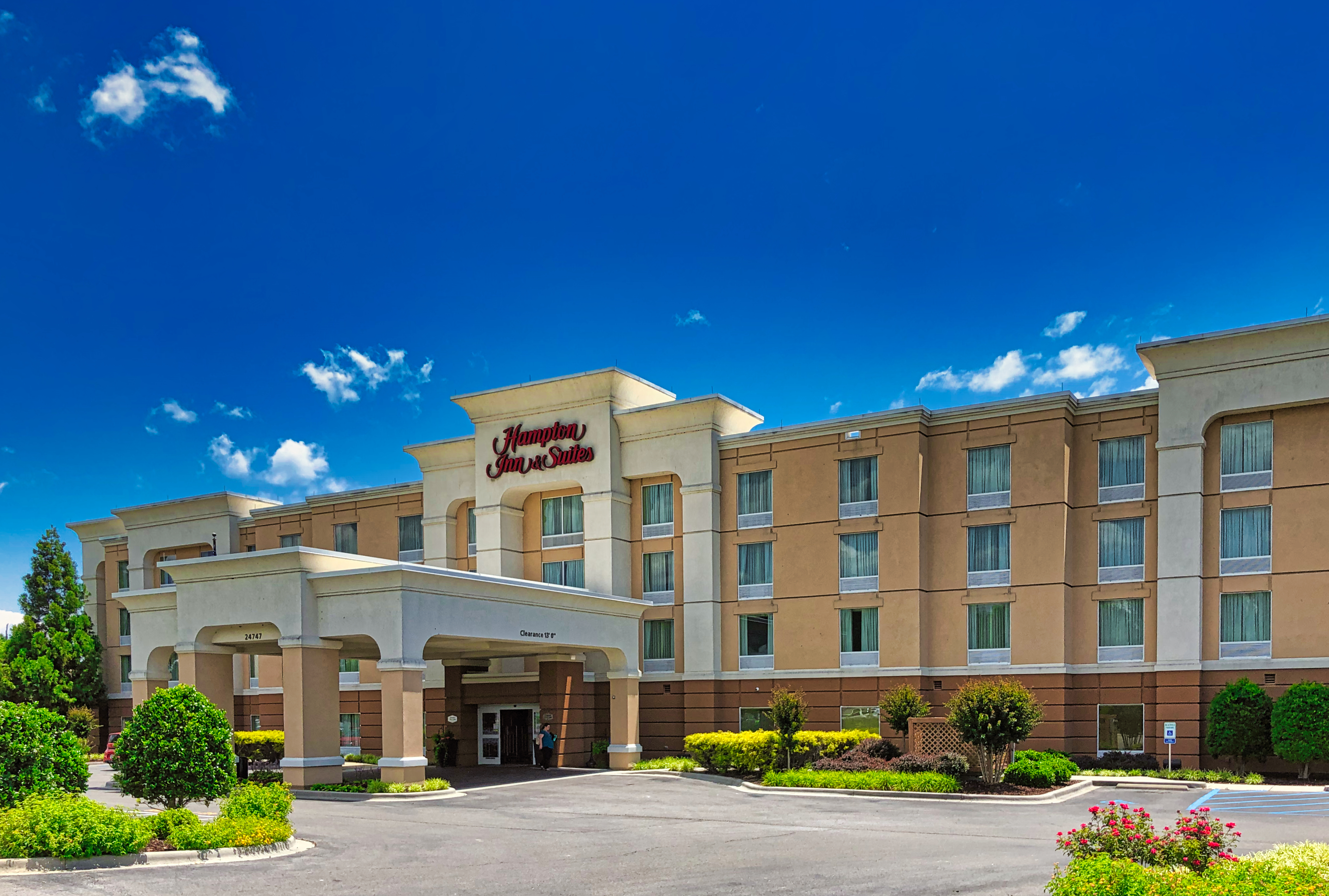
Hampton Inn & Suites in Scottsboro, Alabama

=== Foundation and early years ===
The hotel chain was founded by the Holiday Corporation in 1984 as Hampton Inn, a budget hotel. Its first hotel was a two-story, exterior-entrance building with 128 guest rooms located at 1585 Sycamore View Road in Memphis, Tennessee. In late 1989, after some financial difficulties, Holiday Corporation prepared to sell its hallmark Holiday Inn hotels and started the holding company Promus Hotel Corporation, which included Hampton Inn, Embassy Suites, and Homewood Suites. With this change, Promus re-invested in the Hampton Inn brand and began its change from a budget hotel to a middle-market limited service hotel to compete with their freshly sold former brand. Because of this, they moved away from exterior room access buildings in favor of taller buildings (usually 3-5 stories) with indoor corridors. This eventually resulted in the original Hampton Inn in Memphis closing in 2005. The building has since been a Ramada and an America's Best Value Inn and is currently operated as a Motel 6.

The hotel chain was the first of the mid-price hotels to offer free continental breakfast and the first to introduce the "100 percent satisfaction guarantee". By 1990, the Hampton Inn chain included over 220 properties with more than 27,000 rooms. Hampton Inn and Suites was introduced in 1995, which featured two-room suite style hotel rooms complete with living room and kitchen areas.

Raymond E. Schultz was credited with creating the Hampton Inn brand. His wife, Erin Schultz, is credited with inspiring the name for the brand.

In 1999, Promus Hotel Corporation, which owned Hampton Inn, as well as Embassy Suites, DoubleTree, and Homewood Suites, was bought by Hilton Worldwide for $3.7 billion.

=== Development since 2000 ===
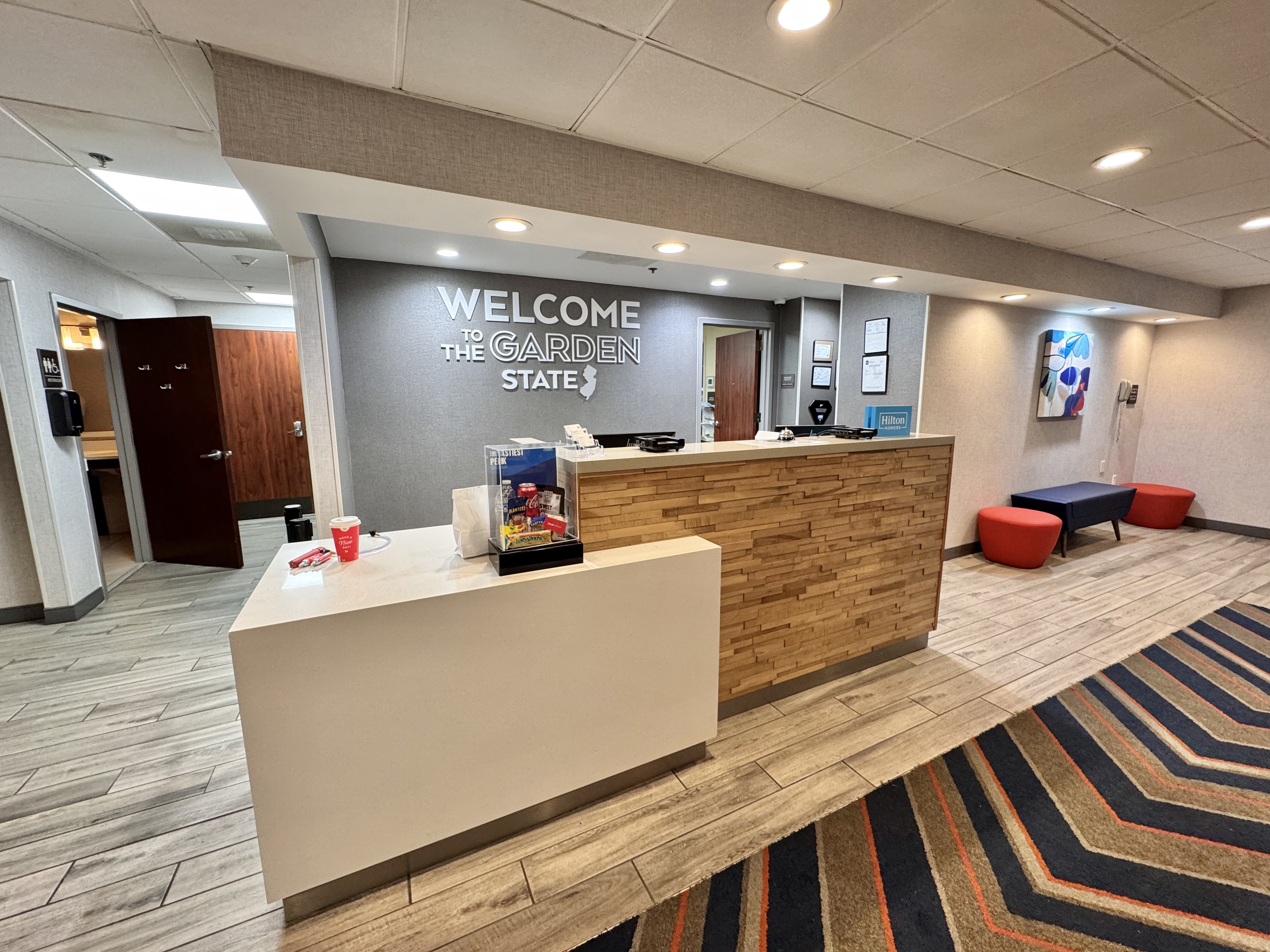
A modern Hampton Inn hotel lobby in New Jersey

In 2004, as part of the $100 million "Make it Hampton" initiative, Hampton began upgrading its hotels including the production of an alarm clock which featured a dimmable clock display, oversized buttons, an easy-to-set alarm, one touch adjustment for daylight saving time and an mp3 player hook-up. Other changes made during the upgrade were general renovations, the switch to white bedding, adding hot food items to continental breakfast options and free high-speed internet to rooms. In 2009, the first "Hampton by Hilton" signage was put in place in the UK with the opening of the brand's first European location.

In 2012, under the "Perfect Mix" initiative, the company completed upgrades to the lobbies of its hotels adding more social space. Hampton continued to renovate its spaces with a campaign introduced in 2013, directed towards younger clientele that included in-room mini-fridges, new bedside tables with power access, updated bathrooms, and updated hotel exteriors. The brand continued to operate internationally as Hampton by Hilton until 2015, when Hilton announced that the official brand names of Embassy Suites and Hampton would include "by Hilton" at all of their locations.

In October 2014, the Hampton by Hilton brand launched in China through a licensing agreement with Plateno Hotels Group. The first of 400 Chinese Hampton hotels opened in 2015. A similar agreement with the Wasl Asset Management group will bring Hampton by Hilton to Dubai.

As of 2025, Hampton is in the budget to upper-midscale lodging segment, designed to compete against other limited service brands like Courtyard by Marriott, Holiday Inn, and Comfort Inn/Comfort Suites.

In 2020, three Hampton Inn locations were used to hold over 100 refugee children by the United States Department of Homeland Security prior to their expulsion.

=== Support for Trump administration immigration policies ===
In January 2026, Hilton removed a Hampton Inn hotel in Minneapolis after the local property refused to accommodate Immigration and Customs Enforcement agents sent there as part of Operation Metro Surge which led to mass protests against Trump and ICE in the area. This was part of Hilton's ongoing support for ICE during the second Trump administration.
