= Homewood Suites by Hilton =

American hotel chain

- Type: Subsidiary
- Industry: Hotel
- Founded: 1989; 37 years ago
- Founder: Promus Hotel Corporation
- Number of locations: 505 (December 31, 2019)
- Area served: United States, Canada, Mexico
- Parent: Hilton Worldwide
- Website: www.homewoodsuites.com

Homewood Suites by Hilton is an American chain of all-suite residential-style hotels owned by Hilton Worldwide. As of December 2019, the chain consists of 505 hotels in 4 countries and territories with 57,545 rooms. 490 Homewood Suites hotels are independently owned and operated by franchisees with 55,899 rooms, while 15 hotels are managed with 1,646 rooms. Homewood Suites competes in the upscale tier of the extended-stay market, along with Staybridge Suites by IHG and Residence Inn by Marriott.

== History ==
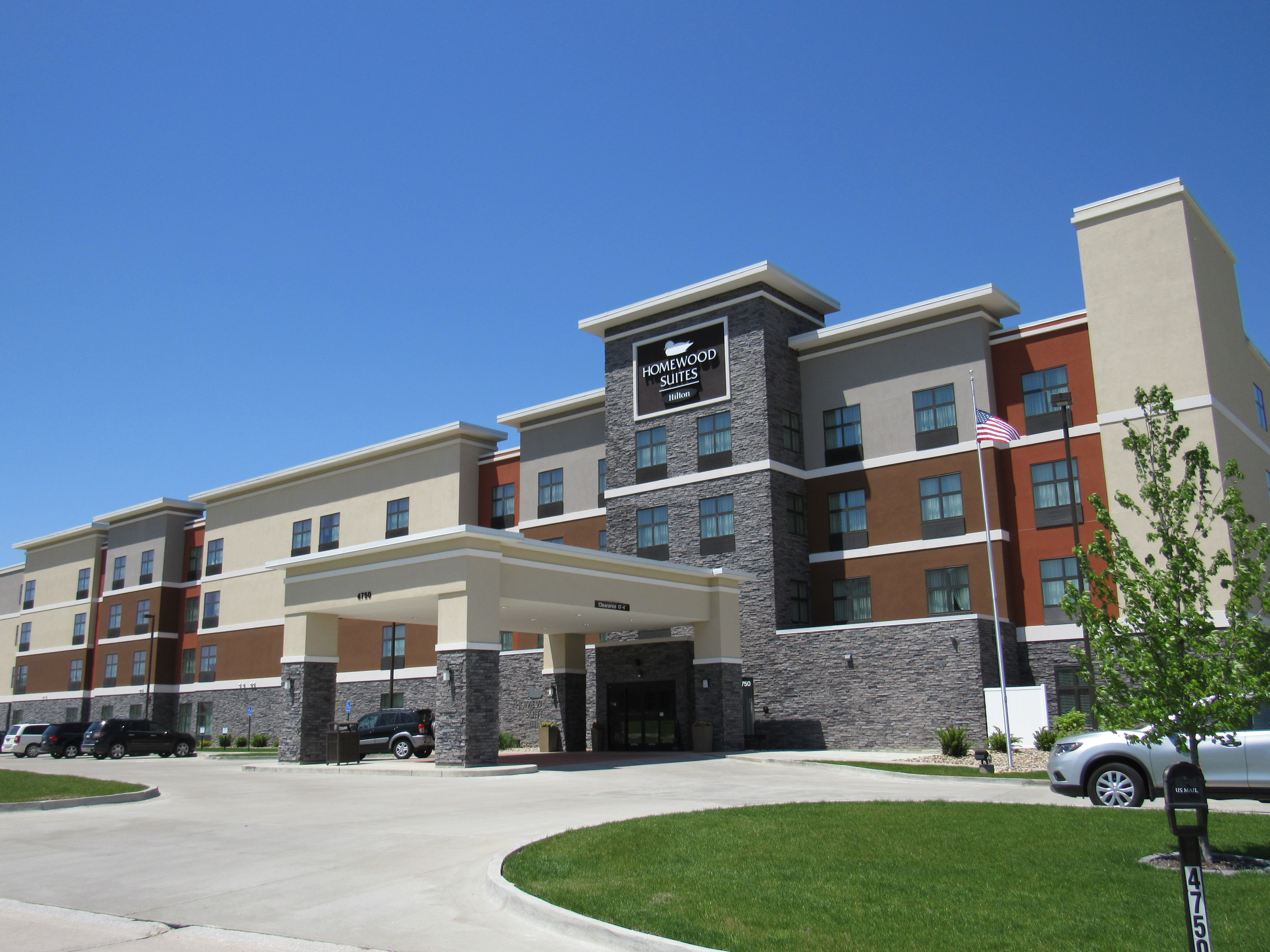
Homewood Suites by Hilton in Davenport, Iowa

The first Homewood Suites was founded in Omaha, Nebraska in 1989. For the next ten years, the hotel chain was owned by Memphis-based Promus Hotel Corporation, which also owned Embassy Suites, Hampton Inn and Doubletree. Hilton purchased Promus in 1999 for $3.1 billion, making Homewood Suites a Hilton brand alongside the other three Promus chains. In 2000, Homewood Suites changed its name to Homewood Suites by Hilton, reflecting the change of ownership that went into effect the year before.

In 2010, Homewood Suites began a partnership with Books for Kids, a New York City based children’s literacy advocacy group. The two organizations opened a library in July 2010 in Memphis, Tennessee.

== Amenities ==
Homewood Suites provides a free hot breakfast every morning, and hosts a free Evening Social reception on Wednesday, consisting of draft beers, house wine, soft drinks and light food options.

== Awards ==
Homewood Suites was named “Top Extended-Stay Hotel” in the 2010 J.D. Power & Associates North America Hotel Guest Satisfaction Index and “2011 Extended-stay Hotel Brand of the Year” by Harris Interactive.
