= Spark by Hilton =

Hotel chain run by Hilton Worldwide

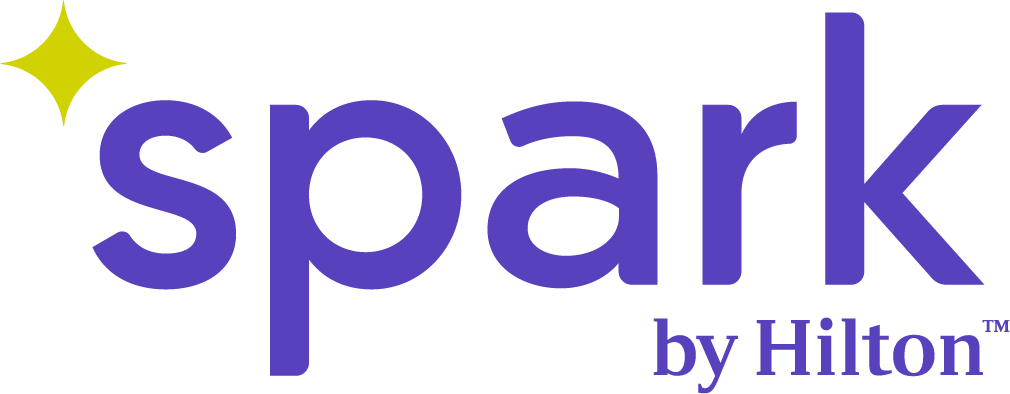
- Type: Subsidiary
- Industry: Hospitality
- Founded: January 2023; 3 years ago
- Founder: Hilton Worldwide
- Headquarters: McLean, Virginia, United States
- Number of locations: 242 (2025)
- Parent: Hilton Worldwide
- Website: sparkbyhilton.com

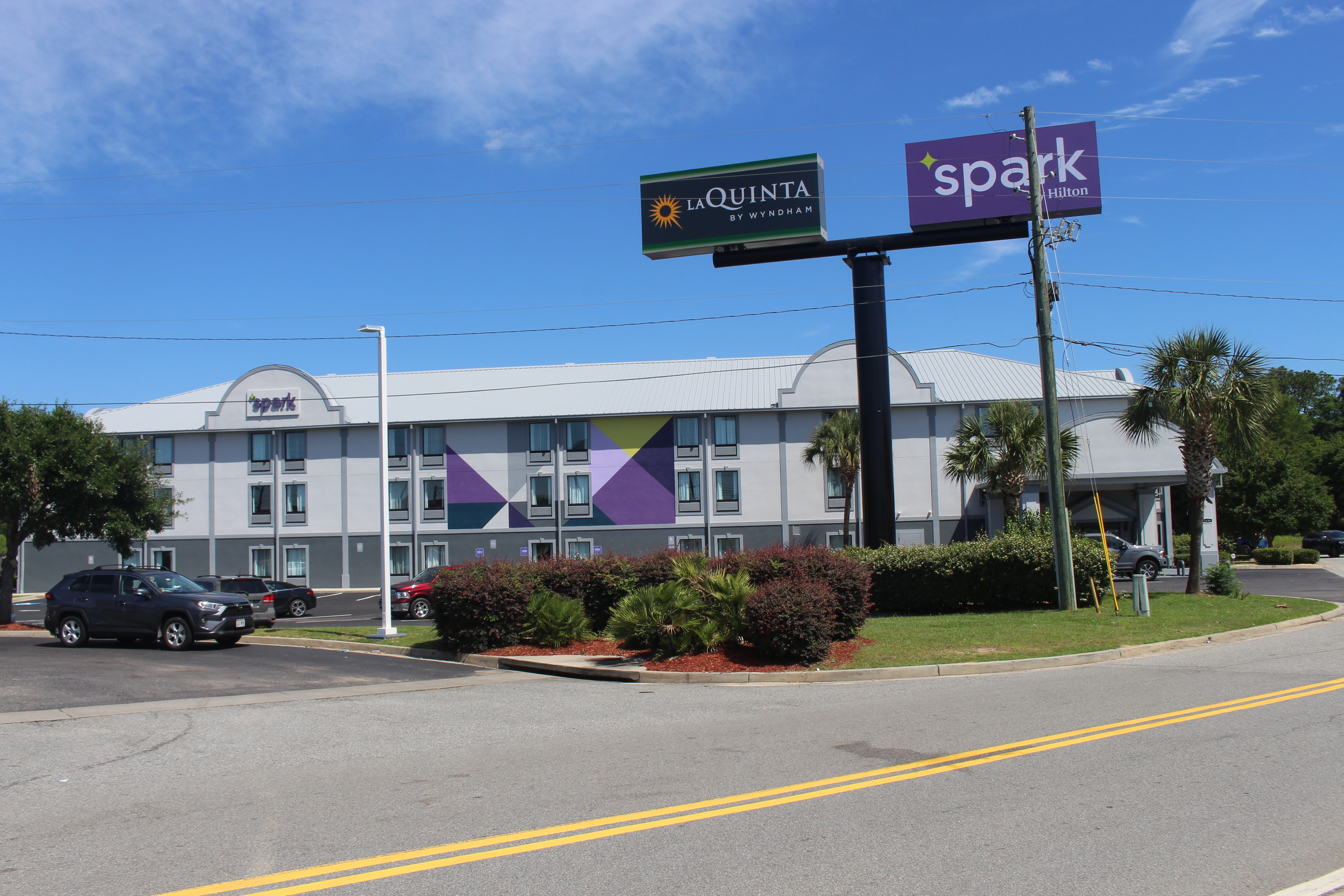
Spark by Hilton in Tifton, Georgia, U.S.

Spark by Hilton is a chain of hotels owned by Hilton Worldwide. It was announced in January 2023, with the first hotel opening that September, and as of 2026 had 21,423 rooms in 242 hotels, all franchised. Spark is a premium economy chain designed to consist primarily of conversions of similar hotel buildings. In addition to units in the United States, Hilton has pursued international development of the brand.

== History ==
Hilton announced Spark by Hilton in January 2023 as its 19th brand. It marked the company's first venture in the economy segment, and its first brand intended to be used to convert existing hotel properties, a growing business tactic in the hospitality industry. Hilton quoted the cost of converting an existing hotel to Spark at $20,000 to $25,000 a room, a renovation that includes adding overhauled lobbies and what The Wall Street Journal described as "modern, minimalist décor and furniture." Hilton focused on secondary and tertiary markets for Spark, particularly those in areas where no other Hilton brands are present.

The first Spark by Hilton opened in September 2023, a 120-room former Days Inn in Mystic, Connecticut. The prototype was converted by the owners of a nearby Hilton hotel. The second Spark by Hilton followed in November 2023 with a 170-room property in Germantown, Maryland. Other Spark units that opened in the first year of the chain's existence included former locations of Country Inn and Suites, Hampton Inn, and independent hotels. In 2024, Fast Company credited Spark as one of the initiatives that made Hilton "one of the most innovative travel and hospitality companies" of the year.

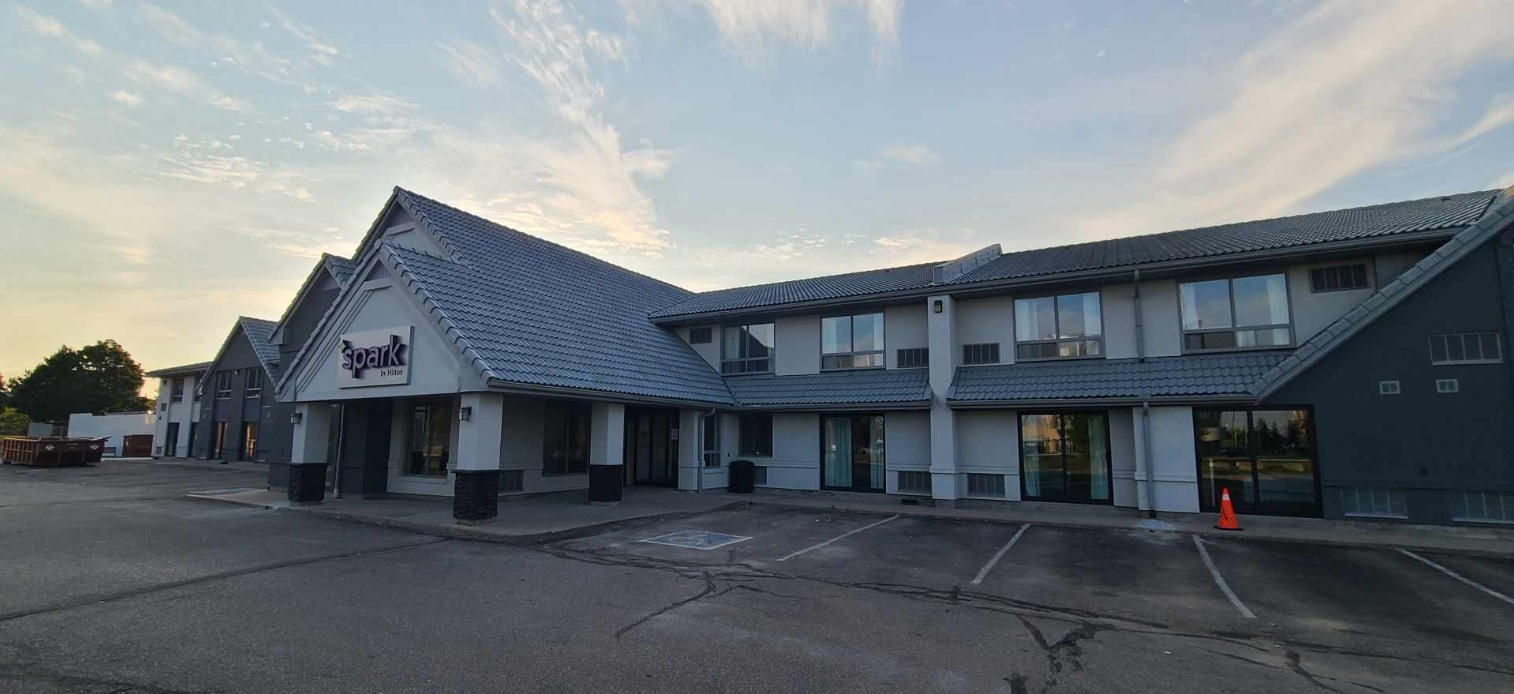
Spark by Hilton Toronto Markham

Hilton has expanded the Spark brand beyond the United States. The 72-room Spark by Hilton Toronto Markham in Ontario, Canada, opened in 2024 as its first hotel there; a unit in London opened that same year as the first Spark in Europe, and another location in Austria had opened by the end of 2024. In 2024, the company struck a licensing agreement with Olive by Embassy, subsidiary of the Embassy Group, for 150 units in India, primarily in the country's south. Hilton launched Spark in Mexico in February 2025, with the goal of establishing some 25 hotels in the country, focused on mid-size and emerging cities. The company opened the first Spark in Saudi Arabia, the Spark by Hilton Makkah Aziziyah in Mecca, in 2025 and a 120-room Spark in Ponce, Puerto Rico, that December as the brand's first property in the Caribbean and Latin America. In June 2026, Hilton announced an expansion of the brand into Italy with a 118-room property in Milan to come later in the year.

As of 2026, the only "newly built" Spark location is the one near Harry Reid International Airport, serving the Las Vegas metro area.
