= Holiday Inn =

Chain of hotels founded in America in 1952

Holiday Inn by IHG
- Type: Subsidiary
- Industry: Hotels
- Founded: August 1, 1952; 74 years ago Memphis, Tennessee, U.S.
- Founder: Kemmons Wilson
- Headquarters: Atlanta, Georgia, U.S.
- Number of locations: 1,173 (September 30, 2018)
- Area served: Americas, Europe, Middle East, Africa, Asia-Pacific
- Services: Food services, lodging, conventions, meetings, timeshares
- Parent: Bass Brewery (1988–2000); Six Continents (2000–2003); IHG Hotels & Resorts (2003–present)
- Divisions: Holiday Inn Express
- Website: www.holidayinn.com

Holiday Inn by IHG is an American chain of hotels based in Atlanta, Georgia and a brand of IHG Hotels & Resorts. The chain was founded in 1952 by Kemmons Wilson (1913–2003), who opened the first location in Memphis, Tennessee. The chain was a division of Bass Brewery from 1988 to 2000, Six Continents from 2000 to 2003, and IHG Hotels & Resorts since 2003. It operates hotels under the names Holiday Inn, Holiday Inn Express, Holiday Inn Club Vacations, and Holiday Inn Resorts. As of 2018, Holiday Inn has hotels at over 1,100 locations.

== History ==
=== 1950s–1970s ===
Kemmons Wilson, a resident of Memphis, Tennessee, was inspired to build a motel after being disappointed by the poor quality of roadside accommodations during a family road trip to Washington, D.C. During the construction, the name "Holiday Inn" was coined by Wilson's architect Eddie Bluestein as a joking reference to the 1942 musical film Holiday Inn. Their first hotel/motel opened in August 1952 as "Holiday Inn Hotel Courts" at 4941 Summer Avenue in Memphis, which at the time was the main highway (U.S. Hwy. 64/70/79) to Nashville. It was demolished in 1994.

Wilson partnered with Wallace E. Johnson to build additional motels on the roads entering Memphis. In 1953, three more Holiday Inns were built on U.S. 51 South, Highway 51 North, and U.S. 61.

By 1957 there were 30 Holiday Inns, and Wilson began marketing the chain as "Holiday Inn of America". There were 50 locations across the US by 1958, 100 by 1959, 500 by 1964, and 1000 in 1968. A number of early locations were franchised, some by the Albert Pick corporation of Chicago. Because a number of Albert Pick franchisees were recommending customers to other Albert Pick hotels instead of to Holiday Inn, the Holiday Inn corporation enacted a rule that franchisees could not own locations of another hotel as well as a Holiday Inn. This led to the Albert Pick-franchised locations exiting the brand by the end of the 1950s. The rule on franchising remained until 1973, when a franchisee was denied the rights to build a location in Newark, New Jersey because of this rule; the United States District Court thus declared the rule a violation of a United States anti-monopoly law.

In 1965, the chain launched Holidex, a centralized reservation system where a visitor to any Holiday Inn could obtain reservations, by teleprinter, for any other Holiday Inn location. Promoting itself as "your host from coast to coast", Holiday Inn added a call center after AT&T's introduction of 800 toll-free telephone number service in 1967. Holiday Inn opened their first campground, Trav-L-Park, in Angola, Indiana, in 1970. Branded as "The Nation's Innkeeper", the chain put considerable financial pressure on traditional motels and hotels, setting the standard for competitors like Ramada Inn, Quality Inn, Howard Johnson's, and Best Western. By June 1972, with over 1,400 Holiday Inns worldwide, Wilson was featured on the cover of Time magazine and the franchise's motto became "The World's Innkeeper".

In 1963, Holiday Inn signed a long-term deal with Gulf Oil where it agreed to accept Gulf credit cards to charge food and lodging at all of its American and Canadian hotels, in return for Gulf building service stations on many Holiday Inn properties, particularly near major U.S. and Interstate highways. The arrangement was copied by competing lodging chains and major oil companies during the mid-to-late 1960s, but fell out of favor following the 1973 oil crisis. The Gulf/Holiday Inn arrangement ended around 1982.

In 1969, Holiday Inns acquired TCO Industries, the holding company for what is now Trailways Transportation System, and the ocean liner and cargo shipping company Delta Shipping.

In 1971, the company constructed the Holiday Inn University and Conference Center, a teaching hotel for training new employees, in Olive Branch, Mississippi. In 1973, the company built the Olive Branch Airport north of the university as a home base for its corporate aircraft. In 1979, the company sold Trailway Transportation System.

In 1982, the company sold Delta Shipping to Crowley Maritime Corporation, which was a San Francisco based tug and barge operator at that time.

The company later branched into other enterprises, including Medi-Center nursing homes, Delta Queen, and Show-Biz, Inc., a television production company that specialized in syndicated country music shows. Wilson also developed the Orange Lake Resort and Country Club near Orlando and a chain called Wilson World Hotels. As of 2014, Wilson's family still operates hotels as part of the Kemmons Wilson Companies of Memphis.

=== The Great Sign ===
The "Great Sign" was a familiar sight on U.S. highways in the 1950s, 1960s, and 1970s.

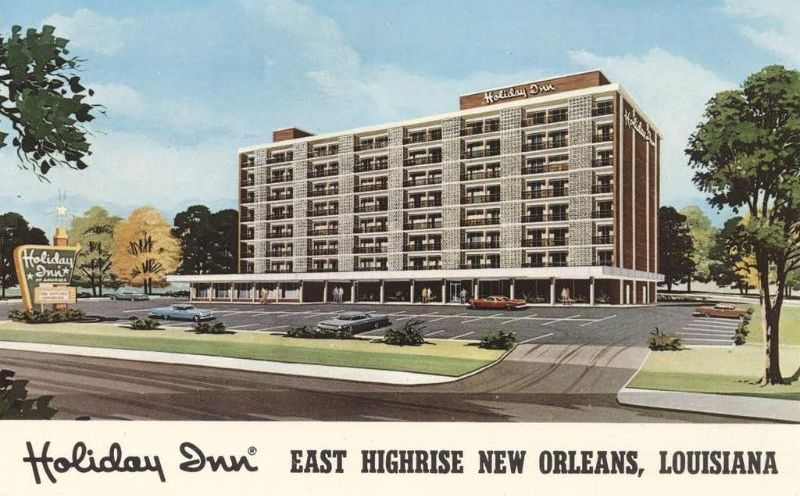
A Holiday Inn in New Orleans, pictured on a postcard c. 1975

The "Great Sign" was the roadside sign used by Holiday Inn during its original era of expansion from the 1950s to 1970s. It was perhaps the company's most successful form of advertising. It was extremely large and eye-catching, but was expensive to construct and maintain. The manufacturer of the sign was Balton & Sons Sign Company, and it was originally designed by sketch artists Gene Barber and Roland Alexander. Wilson wanted a prominent sign, at least 50 feet (15 m) high and visible from both directions. He also wanted a changeable marquee to welcome different groups. The original sign cost $13,000. It is said that the sign's colors were selected because they were favorites of Wilson's mother.

In 1982, following Wilson's departure, the Holiday Inn board of directors phased out the "Great Sign" in favor of a cheaper back-lit sign; Wilson considered it "the worst mistake they ever made". He loved the "Great Sign" so much that it was engraved on his tombstone, with the marquee reading "FOUNDER" and the arrow aimed at his name. The majority of the signs were scrapped but working examples are owned by the American Sign Museum in Cincinnati, Ohio, The Henry Ford Museum in Dearborn, Michigan, and a private collector in Park Hills, Kentucky.

=== 1980s–1990s ===
Although still a healthy company, changing business conditions and demographics saw Holiday Inn lose its market dominance in the 1980s. Holiday Inns, Inc. was renamed "Holiday Corporation" in 1985 to reflect the growth of the company's brands, including Harrah's Entertainment, Embassy Suites Hotels, Crowne Plaza, Homewood Suites, and Hampton Inn. In 1988, Holiday Corporation was purchased by UK-based Bass PLC (then owners of the Bass beer brand), followed by the remaining domestic Holiday Inn hotels in 1990, when founder Wilson sold his interest, after which the hotel group was known as Holiday Inn Worldwide. The remainder of Holiday Corporation (including the Embassy Suites Hotels, Homewood Suites, and Hampton Inn brands) was spun off to shareholders as Promus Companies Incorporated. In 1990, Bass launched Holiday Inn Express, a complementary brand in the limited service segment.

In 1997, Bass created and launched a new hotel brand, Staybridge Suites by Holiday Inn, entering the North American upscale extended stay market. In March 1998, Bass acquired the InterContinental brand, expanding into the luxury hotel market. In 2000 Bass sold its brewing assets (and the rights to the Bass name) and changed its name to Six Continents PLC. InterContinental Hotels Group (IHG) was created in 2003 after Six Continents split into two daughter companies: Mitchells & Butlers PLC to handle restaurant assets, and IHG to focus on soft drinks and hotels, including the Holiday Inn brand.

The brand name Holiday Inn is now owned by IHG, which in turn licenses the name to franchisees and third parties who operate hotels under management agreements. In 1999, the hotel that changed into the Nickelodeon Suites Resort Orlando in 2005, opened, called "Holiday Inn".

=== Development since 2000 ===
The Wall Street Journal reported in 2002 that the company, led by Ravi Saligram, was producing a new 130-room "Next Generation" prototype hotel to rebuild the brand. It would include a bistro-like restaurant and an indoor pool. The first of these prototype hotels, the Holiday Inn Gwinnett Center, was built in Duluth, Georgia, in 2003.

In 2008, Mitchells and Butlers sold off 21 Holiday Inn hotels in exchange for 44 standalone pubs to Whitbread. In September 2008, IHG announced the creation of a new timeshare brand, Holiday Inn Club Vacations, a strategic alliance with The Family of Orange Lake Resorts.

On October 24, 2007, IHG announced a worldwide relaunch of the Holiday Inn brand, which spelled trouble for the remaining motels. The relaunch was "focused on delivering consistently best in class service and physical quality levels, including a redesigned welcome experience [and] signature bedding and bathroom products". The first relaunched Holiday Inn opened in the U.S. in spring 2008. Currently there are more than 2,500 relaunched Holiday Inn brand hotels around the world, and the Holiday Inn global brand relaunch process was completed by the end of 2010. By then, the majority of the HI motels were removed from the chain, with a few exceptions. (In the 1980s and 1990s, HI hotels were built alongside the motel properties [i.e. Baton Rouge, Louisiana] in order to provide more amenities and newer rooms.) When the relaunch occurred, these motels were either demolished or closed off, even if a full-service hotel was already on site. Today, fewer than 10 original Holiday Inn motels still operate, others having been replaced by newer Holiday Inn Express locations or having switched to other chains.

In August 2012, the chain celebrated its 60th anniversary.

In 2022, the Holiday Inn Dhaka City Centre by IHG opened in the Tejgaon Industrial Area, Dhaka, Bangladesh.

In 2024, IHG announced a vast expansion of the Holiday Inn and Holiday Inn Express brands in Germany as part of a franchise and cooperation agreement with German hotel operator Novum Hospitality which in turn will rebrand the majority of their currently over 100 properties into Holiday Inn, including a newly created sub-brand named Holiday Inn - the niu.

== Brands ==
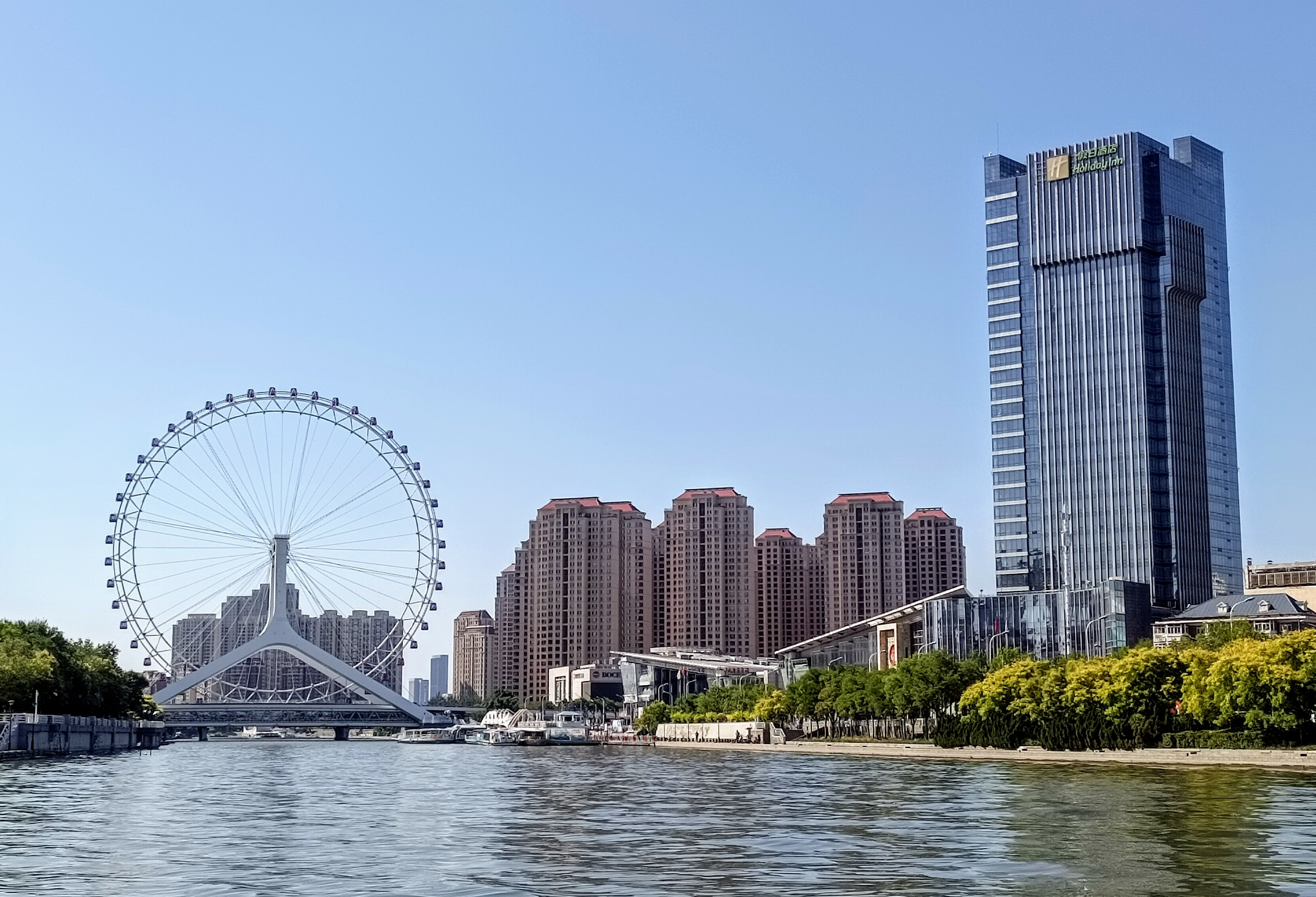
Tianjin Haihe River Holiday Inn

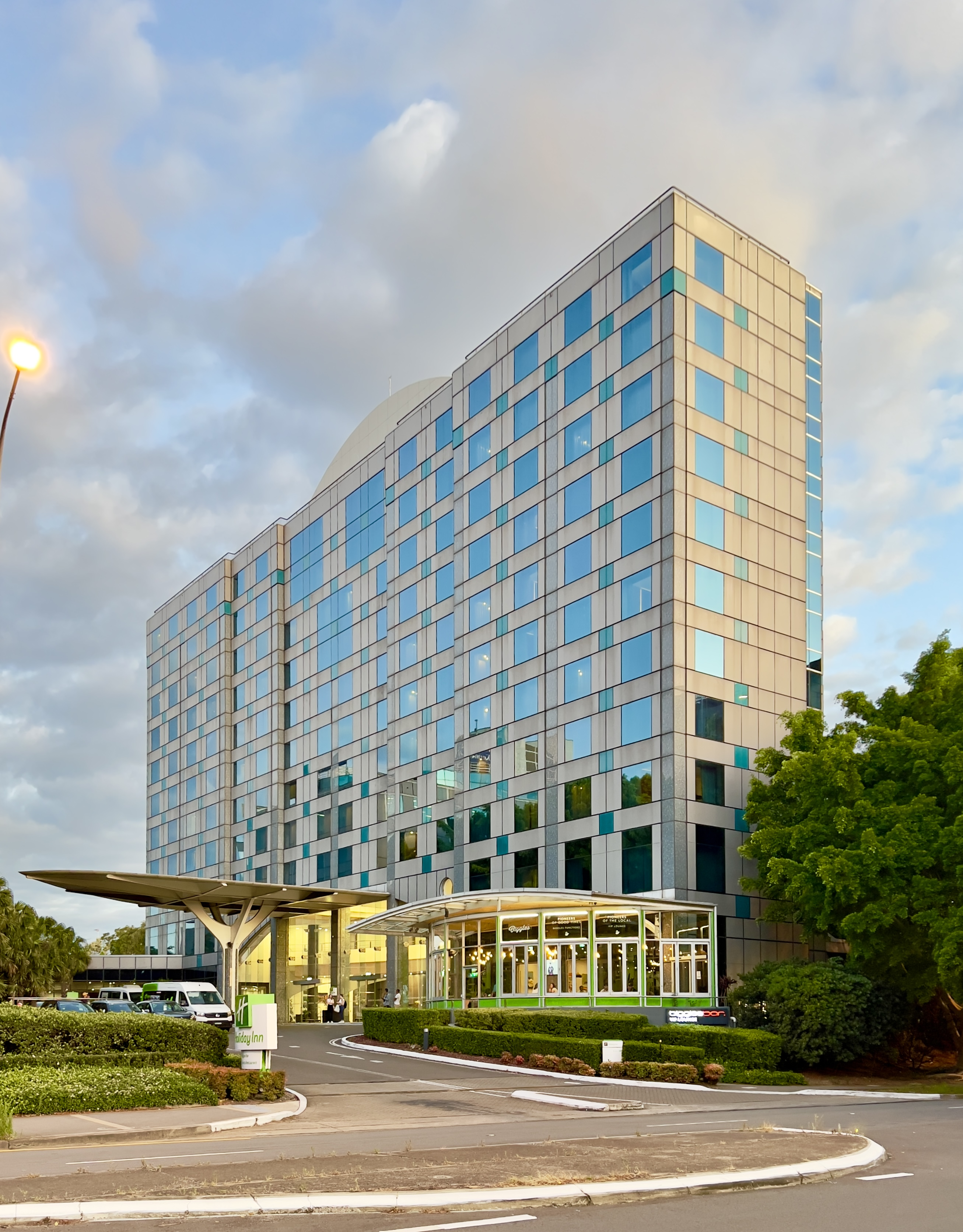
Holiday Inn in Sydney

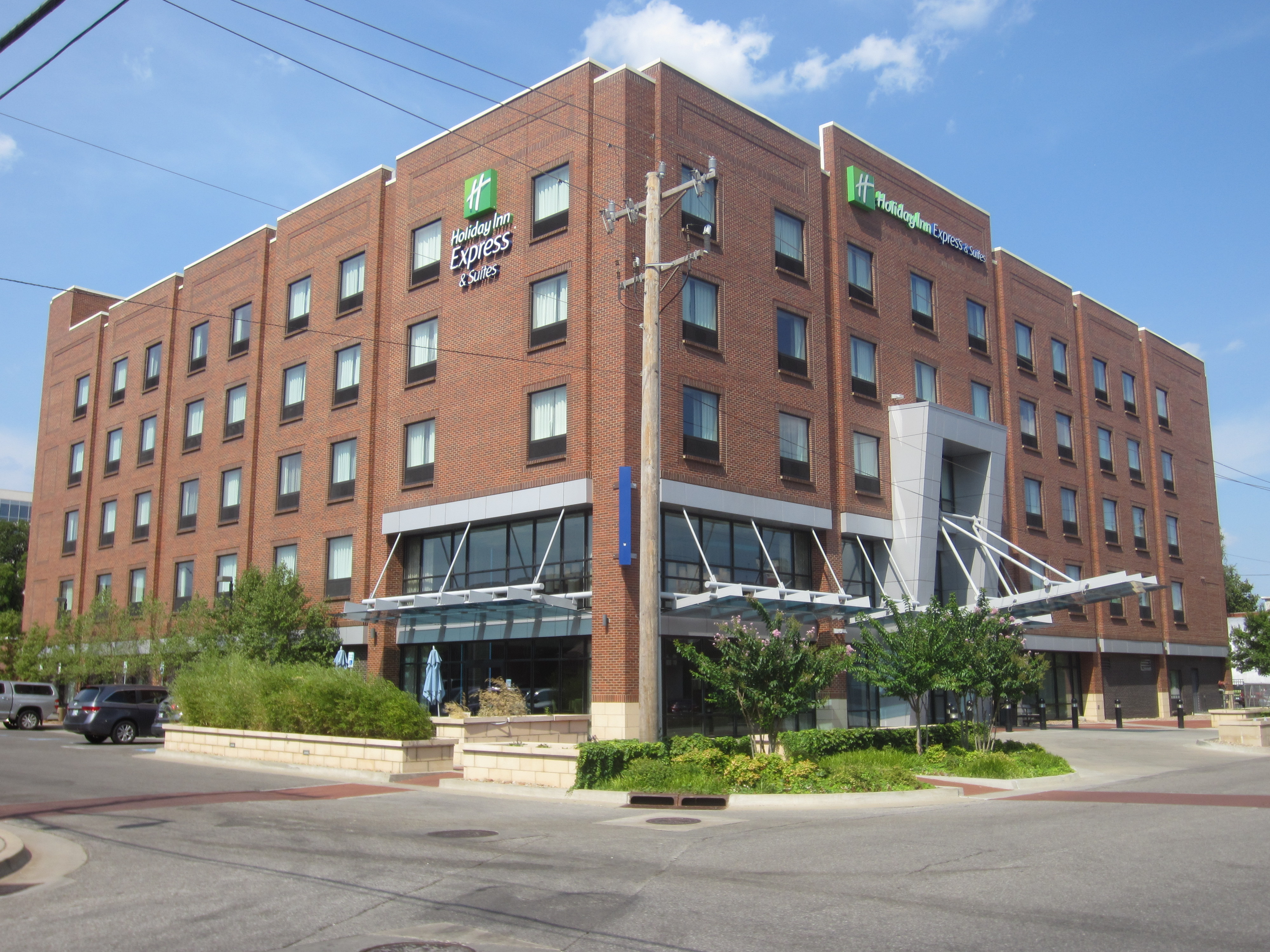
Holiday Inn Hotel & Suites in Oklahoma City

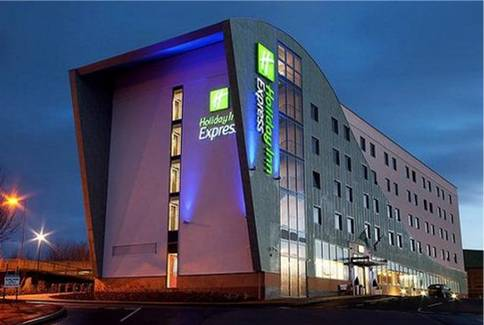
Holiday Inn Express in Tamworth

=== Current properties ===
Holiday Inn currently operates hotels and resorts using the following brands:

- Holiday Inn – This is the most recognizable tier of service. There are two distinct types: high-rise, full-service plaza hotels and low-rise, full-service hotels. The former also included many high-rises with round, central-core construction, instantly recognizable from the 1970s. Both offer a restaurant, pools at most locations, room service, an exercise room, and functional but comfortable rooms.
- Holiday Inn Hotel & Suites – The properties offer all the amenities and services of a regular Holiday Inn but consist of rooms mixed with suites.
- Holiday Inn Resort (called Holiday Inn Sunspree Resort from 1991 to 2007) – The properties also offer all the amenities and services of a full-service Holiday Inn; resorts are considered more of an advertising branding than a completely different brand. Most Holiday Inn Resorts are located in high-leisure-tourism markets.
- Holiday Inn Select – These upper-range full-service hotels cater to business travelers, and are often located next to international airports. In 2006 it was announced that Holiday Inn Select hotels would be discontinued. Existing hotels may continue to operate under the Holiday Inn Select flag until their existing license expires, however many are converting to Crowne Plaza or regular Holiday Inn hotels, with no further marketing or advertising based around the "Select" moniker. This brand no longer appears to exist.
- Holiday Inn Club Vacations – These are resorts aimed at families and are based in the U.S. and Mexico. The accommodations are mostly villas and suites. Membership operates similar to a flexible timeshare basis.
- Holiday Inn Garden Court – The properties exist only in Europe and South Africa and are designed to reflect the national culture. This brand no longer appears to exist.
- Holiday Inn Express – These properties originally focused on economy and limited service, very similar to competitors like Comfort Inn/Comfort Suites, Fairfield Inn & Suites by Marriott and Hampton by Hilton, providing only continental breakfast and an exercise room. However newer Holiday Inn Express feature most amenities from the higher-end Holiday Inn brand, such as a restaurant and bar, conference rooms and a fitness center with a swimming pool. A major differentiation is location, with Express properties typically situated in suburbs and along freeways, while Holiday Inn is situated in urban areas (including downtowns) and often near tourist attractions. Most Holiday Inn Express locations now offer a hot breakfast option.

=== Former properties ===
- Holiday Inn Jr. was a motel brand during the 1960s and 1970s with just 44 to 48 guest rooms and limited amenities. The first such location opened in Camden, Arkansas in 1964. The last hotel to operate under the Holiday Inn Jr. name was in Huntingdon, Pennsylvania, which remained in operation until it burned down in 1979.
- Holiday Inn Crowne Plaza was separated from Holiday Inn in 1994 to form a distinctive brand, Crowne Plaza. Nonetheless, Holiday Inn brochures still continued to list the locations of Crowne Plaza alongside other Holiday Inn properties.

== Trademark conflicts ==
For two decades a hotel called Holiday Inn located in Niagara Falls, Ontario prevented the Holiday Inn Corporation from operating one of its own hotels in that city since the name was already in use. The hotel used a logo similar to the old Holiday Inn logo from the 1970s. The Holiday Inn Corporation directory referred to the hotel as "not part of this Holiday Inn system". The hotel also owned the holidayinn.com domain, which forced the much larger corporation to use holiday-inn.com. In 2006, an agreement between IHG and the Niagara Falls, Ontario hotel owners was reached that allowed both the Hotel and Holidayinn.com to be incorporated into the IHG system.

During the 1960s and early 1970s, Holiday Inn hotels located in Myrtle Beach, South Carolina were simply called "Holiday" because a local motel already had the "Holiday Inn" name. The Myrtle Beach motel started as Ocean Front Lodge in 1948 but changed the name to Holiday Inn in 1949 (three years before the founding of the chain), and put up a sign in 1955 with similar lettering to that of the chain, which registered its sign in 1954. The chain first franchised motels in the area in 1956. The Myrtle Beach hotel put up a sign resembling the "Great Sign" in 1968, and used "®" with its name, though many of its items came from suppliers which assumed they were selling to the chain. The Myrtle Beach hotel "began a concurrent use proceeding in the Patent and Trademark Office" in 1970, which was suspended when the name was contested before the United States District Court for the District of South Carolina (Florence division) in 1973. The court said the Myrtle Beach hotel had plenty of repeat business and was not negatively impacted by the chain's motels in the area. The 1973 injunction meant the Myrtle Beach hotel was granted the right to use the name but with a different style of lettering. The concurrent use proceeding resumed for the Myrtle Beach hotel, which continued to operate as "Holiday Inn", although it was required to use a distinctly different font. A 1976 ruling granted the Myrtle Beach Hotel the right to a service mark. A 1979 order denied a motion to modify the 1973 injunction, though it was believed the hotel had followed all restrictions. A 1981 decision by the 4th Circuit Court of Appeals upheld the 1979 action.

== See also ==
- List of chained-brand hotels
- List of hotels
