= Christopher J. Nassetta =

American chief executive officer (born 1964)

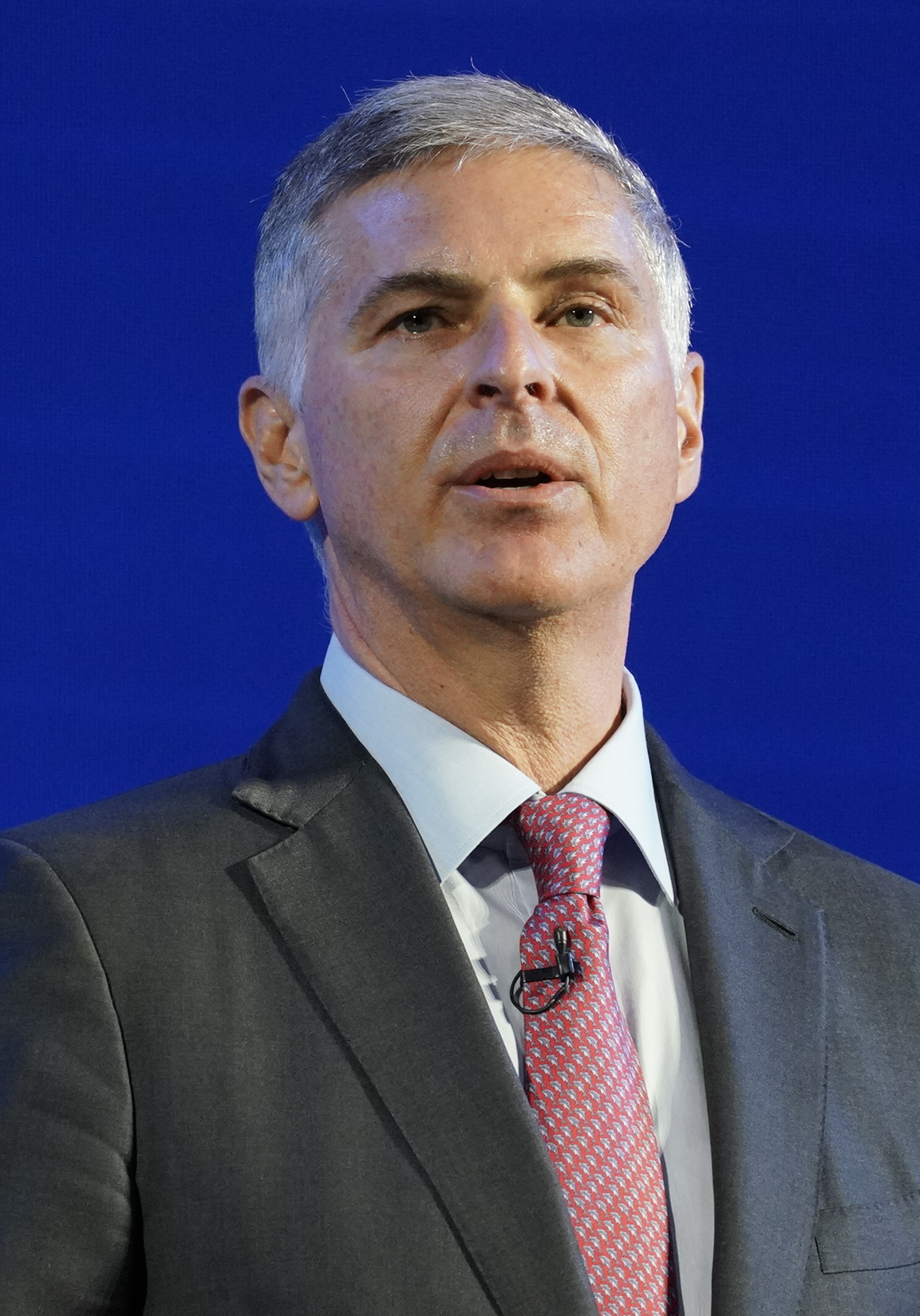
- Nassetta in 2019
- Born: 1964 (age 61–62); Arlington, Virginia, U.S.
- Education: University of Virginia; London School of Economics
- Occupation: Businessman
- Title: President and CEO, Hilton Worldwide (2007‍–‍present)
- Children: 6

Christopher J. Nassetta (born 1964) is an American businessman who has served as president and chief executive officer of Hilton since 2007. Under his leadership, Hilton has expanded from approximately 3,700 properties to more than 7,600 properties across 126 countries and territories, and was named the No. 1 World's Best Workplace by Fortune and Great Place to Work. In June 2022, Nassetta was included on the International Hospitality Institute's list of the 100 Most Powerful People in Global Hospitality.

== Early life and education ==
Nassetta was born in 1964 in Arlington, Virginia. He attended Yorktown High School in Arlington before enrolling at the McIntire School of Commerce at the University of Virginia, where he earned a Bachelor of Science degree in finance in 1984. He subsequently undertook coursework in international finance at the London School of Economics. Nassetta continues to serve on the McIntire School of Commerce Advisory Board.

When he was 16, he worked at a Holiday Inn on Capitol Hill in Washington, D.C. in the engineering department.

== Career ==
=== Early career ===
After graduating from the University of Virginia, Nassetta joined The Oliver Carr Company, one of the largest commercial real estate firms in the Mid-Atlantic region, where he spent seven years and rose to the position of chief development officer. In this role he was responsible for all development activities for the firm.

In 1991, Nassetta co-founded Bailey Capital Corporation, a private real estate investment and advisory firm. He oversaw the firm's operations, directing investment activities focused on the Washington, D.C., metropolitan area, until 1995.

=== Hilton ===
On October 29, 2007, shortly after The Blackstone Group's $26 billion leveraged buyout of Hilton Hotels Corporation, Nassetta was appointed president and CEO of Hilton. Jonathan Gray, then Blackstone's head of global real estate, recruited Nassetta to lead the company's turnaround.

Nassetta assumed the role amid the global financial crisis, during which Blackstone was forced to write down the value of its Hilton investment by approximately 70 percent.

In 2023, Nassetta's total compensation from Hilton Worldwide was $26.6 million, up 13% from the previous year and representing a CEO-to-median worker pay ratio of 549-to-1 for that year.

== Personal life ==
Nassetta is married to Paige, his high school prom date and the daughter of former Arkansas congressman Ed Bethune. The couple has six daughters.
