= Hilton Worldwide =

American hospitality company

Hilton Worldwide Holdings Inc.

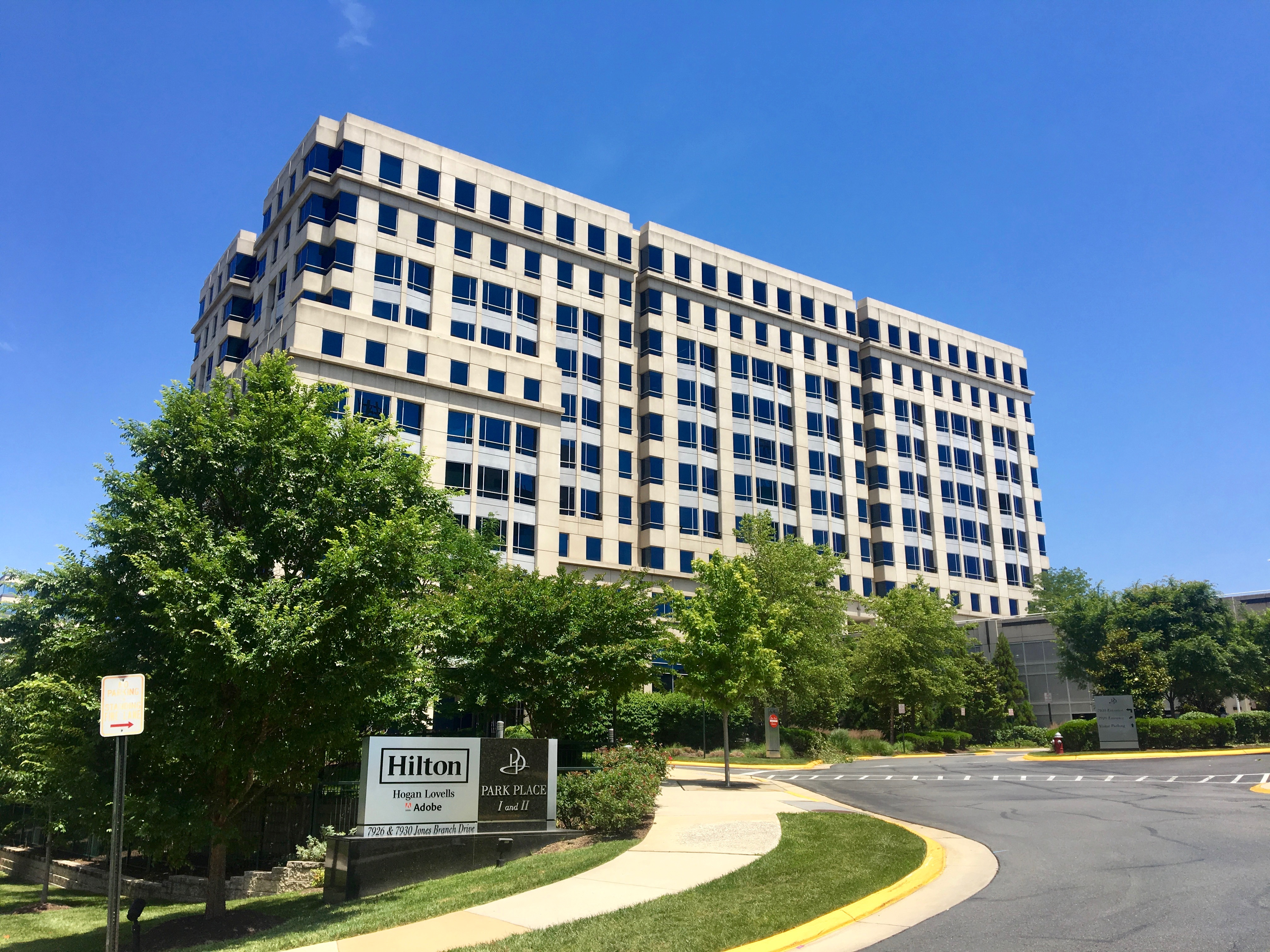
- Hilton Worldwide headquarters in Tysons, Virginia
- Formerly: Hilton Hotels Corporation (1948–2009)
- Type: Public
- Traded as: NYSE: HLT; S&P 500 component
- Industry: Hospitality
- Founded: May 31, 1919; 107 years ago, in Cisco, Texas, U.S.
- Founder: Conrad Hilton
- Headquarters: Tysons, Virginia, U.S.
- Number of locations: ▲9,158 (2025)
- Area served: Worldwide
- Key people: Christopher J. Nassetta (president and CEO); Jonathan D. Gray (chairman)
- Products: Hotels; Resorts
- Brands: Canopy by Hilton; Conrad Hotels; Curio; DoubleTree; Embassy Suites by Hilton; Graduate Hotels; Hampton by Hilton; Hilton Garden Inn; Hilton Grand Vacations; Hilton Hotels & Resorts; Home2 Suites by Hilton; Homewood Suites by Hilton; LivSmart Studios by Hilton; LXR Hotels & Resorts; Motto by Hilton; The NoMad; Outset Collection by Hilton; Signia by Hilton; Spark by Hilton; Tapestry Collection by Hilton; Tempo by Hilton; Tru by Hilton; Waldorf Astoria Hotels & Resorts
- Revenue: ▲US$12.0 billion (2025)
- Net income: ▼US$1.46 billion (2025)
- Total equity: ▼US$−5.36 billion (2025)
- Number of employees: ▲182,000 (2025) (2023)
- Website: hilton.com

Hilton Worldwide Holdings Inc. is an American multinational hospitality company that manages and franchises a broad portfolio of hotels, resorts, and timeshare properties. Founded by Conrad Hilton in May 1919, the company is now led by Christopher J. Nassetta. Hilton is headquartered in Tysons, Virginia, United States.

As of December 31, 2023, the company's portfolio includes 7,530 properties (including timeshare properties) with 1,182,937 rooms in 118 countries and territories. Hilton owns or leases 51 properties, manages 800 properties, and franchises out the remainder.

== History ==
=== Foundation and early years ===
In 1919, Conrad Hilton purchased his first hotel, the 40-room Mobley Hotel in Cisco, Texas, and bought additional Texas hotels as the years passed. In 1925, the Dallas Hilton became the first hotel to use the Hilton name. In 1927, Hilton expanded to Waco, Texas, where he opened the first hotel with air-conditioning in public areas and cold running water.

In 1943, Hilton assumed management of the Roosevelt Hotel and purchased the Plaza Hotel, both in New York City's Midtown Manhattan neighborhood. With this pair of acquisitions, Hilton became the first hospitality company to span the contiguous United States. The company was incorporated in 1946 as the Hilton Hotels Corporation and subsequently began public trading of shares on the New York Stock Exchange. In 1947, the Roosevelt Hotel became the first hotel in the world to have televisions in its rooms.

In 1947, Hilton assumed management of the Palacio Hilton hotel in Chihuahua, Mexico, which became the chain's first international property. That same year, they assumed management of four hotels on the island of Bermuda. Hilton International was founded as a wholly owned subsidiary in 1948, just before the 1949 opening of the Caribe Hilton Hotel in Puerto Rico. Barman Ramon "Monchito" Marreno claimed he created the piña colada cocktail at this resort. Hilton purchased The Waldorf-Astoria in New York in the same year.

=== 1950s to 1980s ===
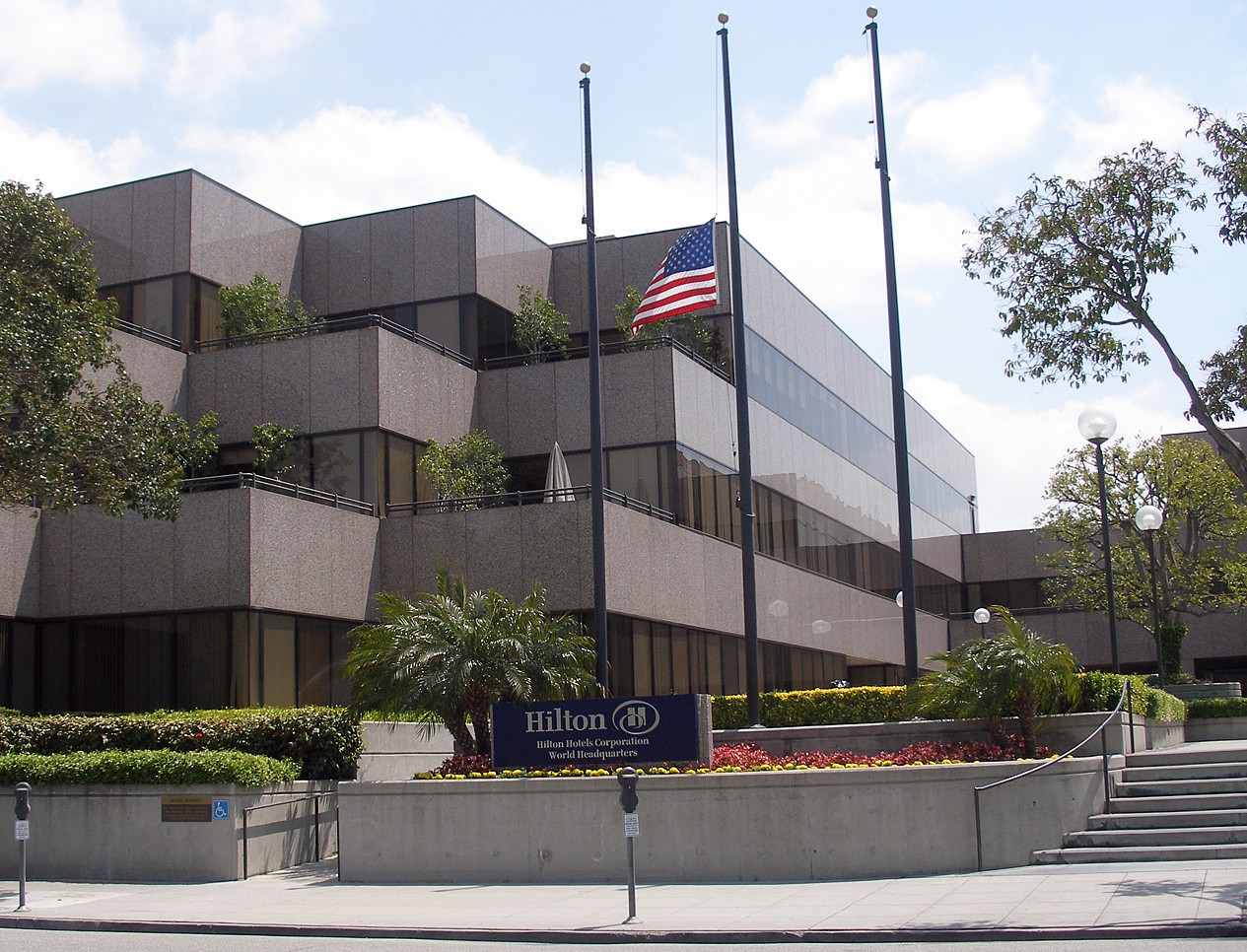
The former Hilton Hotels Corporation headquarters in Beverly Hills, California

In 1953, Hilton opened its first hotel in Europe, the Castellana Hilton in Madrid, Spain. The Hotels Statler Company was acquired in 1954 for $111 million in what was then the world's most expensive real estate transaction.

Hilton is credited with several early innovations. In 1954, Hilton created the world's first central reservations office, titled "HILCRON". The reservations team in 1955 consisted of eight members on staff booking reservations for any of Hilton's then 28 hotels. Reservations agents used the "availability board" to track records. The chalkboard measured 30 feet (9.1 m) by 6 feet (1.8 m) and allowed HILCRON to make over 6,000 reservations in 1955. Bookings could be made for any Hilton via telephone, telegram, or Teletype. Later in 1955, Hilton launched a program to ensure every hotel room would include air conditioning. Hilton is also credited with pioneering the airport hotel concept with the opening of the Hilton Inn at San Francisco International Airport in 1959. International expansion continued in this era. From 1955 to 1963, Hilton opened hotels in Turkey, Central America, Canada, Africa, Oceania, South America, and Asia.

In 1965, Hilton launched Lady Hilton, the first hotel concept created specifically for women guests. To appeal to female travelers, many properties offered floors occupied by only women along with distinct amenities for their usage. Between 1970 and 1971, Hilton acquired the International Leisure Company, including the International Hotel and the Flamingo Hotel, which were renamed the Las Vegas Hilton and the Flamingo Hilton. The properties would become the first in the domestic gaming business to be listed on the NYSE. In 1977, Hilton International opened its first property behind the "Iron Curtain" in Communist Europe, the Budapest Hilton. In 1979, founder Conrad Hilton died at the age of 91. Hilton Hotels Corporation later created the Conrad Hotels brand in honor of Hilton.

Hilton Honors (formerly Hilton HHonors), the company's guest loyalty program, was initiated in 1987. In 1994, the Honors surpassed competing hotel loyalty programs by offering members both hotel credit points and airline credit miles. In 1998, Hilton spun off its gambling operations into a separate, publicly held company called Park Place Entertainment (later Caesars Entertainment, Inc.) In 1999, Hilton acquired Promus Hotel Corporation, which included the DoubleTree, Red Lion, Embassy Suites, Hampton Inn, and Homewood Suites brands.

=== Two chains with one name ===
The company spun off its international operations into a separately traded company on December 1, 1964, known as "Hilton International Co." It was acquired in 1967 by Trans World Corp., the holding company for Trans World Airlines. As a result, there were two separate, fully independent companies operating hotels under the Hilton name. Because the two chains were contractually forbidden to operate hotels in the other's territory under the Hilton name, for many years hotels run by Hilton International in the U.S. were called Vista International Hotels, while hotels operated by the American arm of Hilton outside the U.S. were named Conrad Hotels. Those Hilton Hotels outside the U.S. were, until 2006, styled as "Hilton International" hotels.

In 1986, Hilton International was sold to UAL Corp., the holding company for United Airlines, for $980 million. UAL was reorganized as Allegis Corp. in an attempt to re-incarnate itself as a full-service travel company, encompassing Westin Hotels and Hertz rental cars in addition to Hilton International and United Airlines. In 1987, after a corporate putsch, the renamed Allegis sold Hilton International to Ladbroke Group plc, a British leisure and gambling company, for $1.07 billion. In May 1999, Ladbrokes was reorganized as "Hilton Group plc".

In 1997, to minimize longtime consumer confusion, the American-owned Hilton and British-owned Hilton International companies adopted a joint marketing agreement, under which they shared the same logos, promoted each other's brands, and maintained joint reservation systems. At that point, the Vista chain was phased out, while Conrad was restyled as one of the luxury brands of Hilton, operating hotels within the U.S. and abroad. The alliance was announced in August 1996 by Hilton Hotels Corporation and Ladbroke Group, the owner of Hilton International; their chief executives, Stephen Bollenbach and Peter George, joined each other's boards.

=== 2000s ===
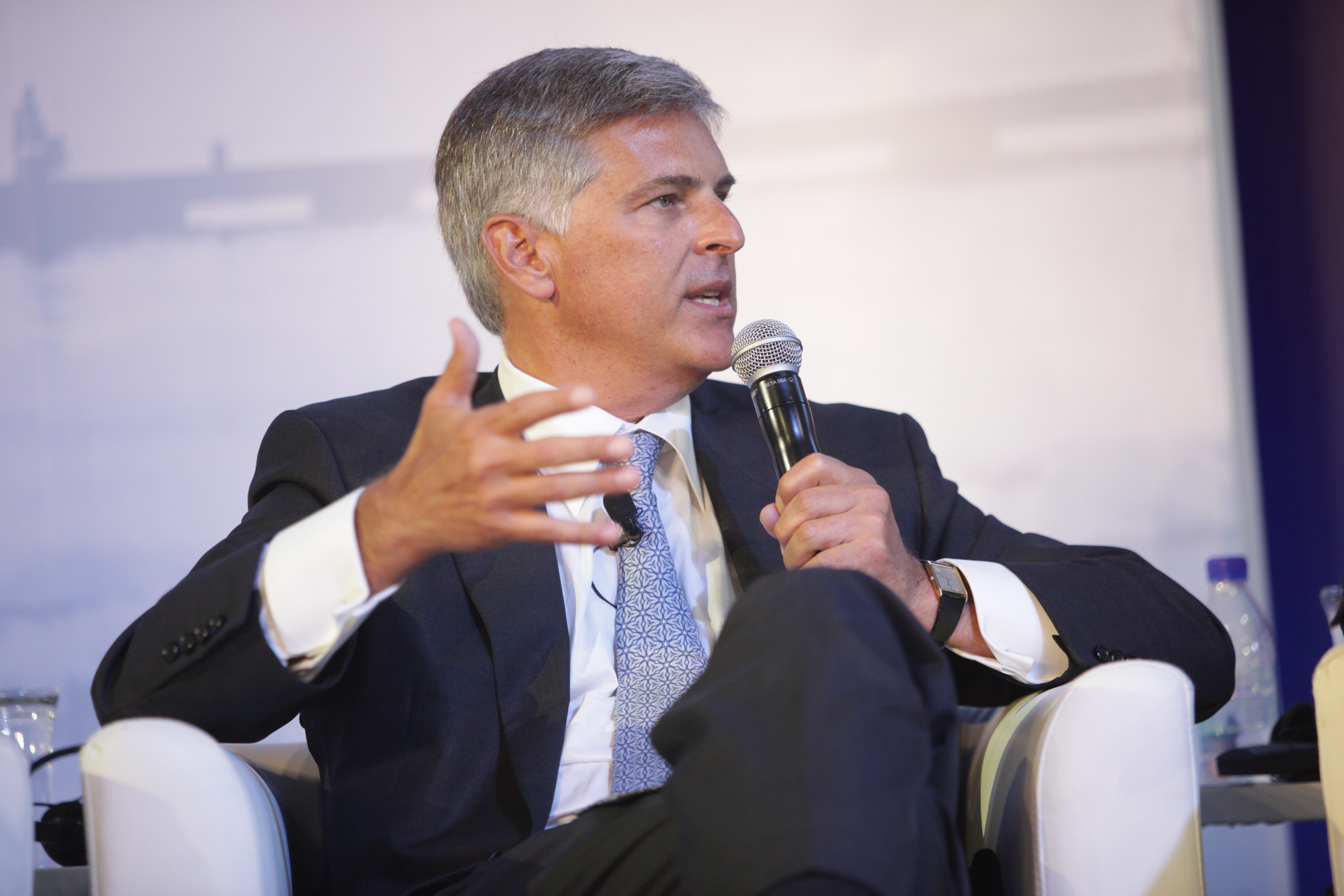
Christopher J. Nassetta, Hilton Worldwide President and CEO, in 2004

In 2001, Hilton agreed to sell Red Lion to WestCoast Hospitality.

On December 29, 2005, Hilton Hotels Corporation agreed to re-acquire the Hilton International chain from its British owner, Hilton Group plc, for £3.3 billion ($5.71 billion). As well as bringing the two Hilton companies back together as a single entity, this deal also included Hilton plc properties operating as Conrad Hotels, Scandic Hotels, and LivingWell Health Clubs. On February 23, 2006, the deal closed, making Hilton Hotels the world's fifth-largest hotel operator in number of rooms. Scandic Hotels was sold the next year on March 1 to EQT AB.

On July 3, 2007, Hilton Hotels Corp. agreed to an all-cash buyout from the Blackstone Group LP in a $26 billion (including debt) deal that would make Blackstone the world's largest hotel owner. At $47.50 per share, the buyout price was 32 percent higher than the closing value of a share of Hilton stock on July 3. The deal was the culmination of a year of on and off discussions with Blackstone. In October 2007, Christopher J. Nassetta was appointed president and chief executive officer of Hilton. In February 2009, Hilton Hotels Corp. announced that its headquarters were moving from Beverly Hills, California to Fairfax County, Virginia.

While Blackstone saw an opportunity to streamline the company and push Hilton's expansion overseas when Blackstone pursued Hilton in 2006 and 2007, the buyout saddled the company with $20 billion of debt just before the 2008 financial crisis. In April 2010, Hilton and Blackstone restructured the debt with Blackstone invested a further $800 million of equity and the debt was reduced to $16 billion.

Hilton returned to being a public company on December 12, 2013. This second IPO in the company's history raised an estimated $2.35 billion. The Blackstone Group retained a 45.8% stake in the company. The company announced in February 2016 that Hilton would turn its hotel holdings into a real estate investment trust. In February 2016, Hilton announced its intention to spin off its timeshare and real estate businesses, creating three independent public companies. The spin-offs of Park Hotels & Resorts and Hilton Grand Vacations were completed in January 2017. As of 2018, the company is a fully independent publicly traded company after the exits of Blackstone and HNA. On February 7, 2024, Hilton announced an exclusive partnership with Small Luxury Hotels of the World.

On April 3, 2024, Hilton announced its acquisition of a majority controlling interest in Sydell Group, the owner of NoMad Hotels, aiming to expand the luxury lifestyle brand with up to 100 new NoMad hotels globally.

In June 2026, Hilton Worldwide announced Undergraduate by Hilton, a spin-off of Graduate. The first property is expected to open in 2027.

== Brands ==
As of 2026, Hilton Worldwide owns 22 hotel and resort brands in six internal categories:

=== Luxury ===
- Waldorf Astoria Hotels & Resorts
- Conrad Hotels
- LXR Hotels & Resorts
- NoMad Hotels
- Signia by Hilton

=== Lifestyle ===
- Canopy by Hilton
- Curio Collection by Hilton
- Graduate by Hilton
- Tapestry Collection by Hilton
- Outset Collection by Hilton
- Apartment Collection by Hilton
- Tempo by Hilton
- Motto by Hilton
- Undergraduate by Hilton (coming 2027)

==== Curio ====
Curio by Hilton logo

Curio Collection by Hilton is an upscale hotel brand within the Hilton Worldwide portfolio. As a soft brand, each property is supported by Hilton while maintaining its own independent branding and identity. Hilton selects independent hotels and resorts to be part of the Curio Collection. Jenna Hackett is the global head.

The brand was launched in June 2014, as one of Hilton’s first lifestyle brands and its first collection brand. Curio Collection properties use Hilton's reservation system and are part of Hilton Honors, Hilton's guest-loyalty program.

Curio Collection by Hilton is likened to Marriott International's Autograph Collection.

=== Full Service ===
- Hilton Hotels & Resorts
- DoubleTree by Hilton

=== Focused Service ===
- Hilton Garden Inn
- Hampton by Hilton
- Tru by Hilton
- Spark by Hilton

=== All Suites ===
- Embassy Suites by Hilton
- Homewood Suites by Hilton
- Home2 Suites by Hilton
- LivSmart Studios by Hilton

=== Select by Hilton ===
- Yotel

=== Vacation Ownership ===
- Hilton Grand Vacations
  - Hilton Club
  - Hilton Vacation Club
  - Hilton Grand Vacations Club
  - Diamond Resorts
  - Embarc Resorts
  - Bluegreen Corporation

=== Franchising ===
As of February 2024, 6,679 of Hilton's 7,530 hotels and timeshare resorts worldwide are owned and operated by independent franchisees or companies and not by Hilton Worldwide itself, this includes Hilton Grand Vacations which was a division of Hilton Worldwide until it was spun off into a separate company to act as a franchisee for Hilton's timeshare brands. Through this franchising model Hilton Worldwide owns the Hilton hotel and resort brands along with the intellectual property associated with them but does not own nor operate the physical hotels and resorts that bear those brand names. In order to utilize the Hilton brands, the independent franchisees and companies must follow strict brand standards to maintain a licensing agreement with Hilton Worldwide. Many of Hilton's flagship properties, airport properties, and largest resorts, however, are corporately managed.

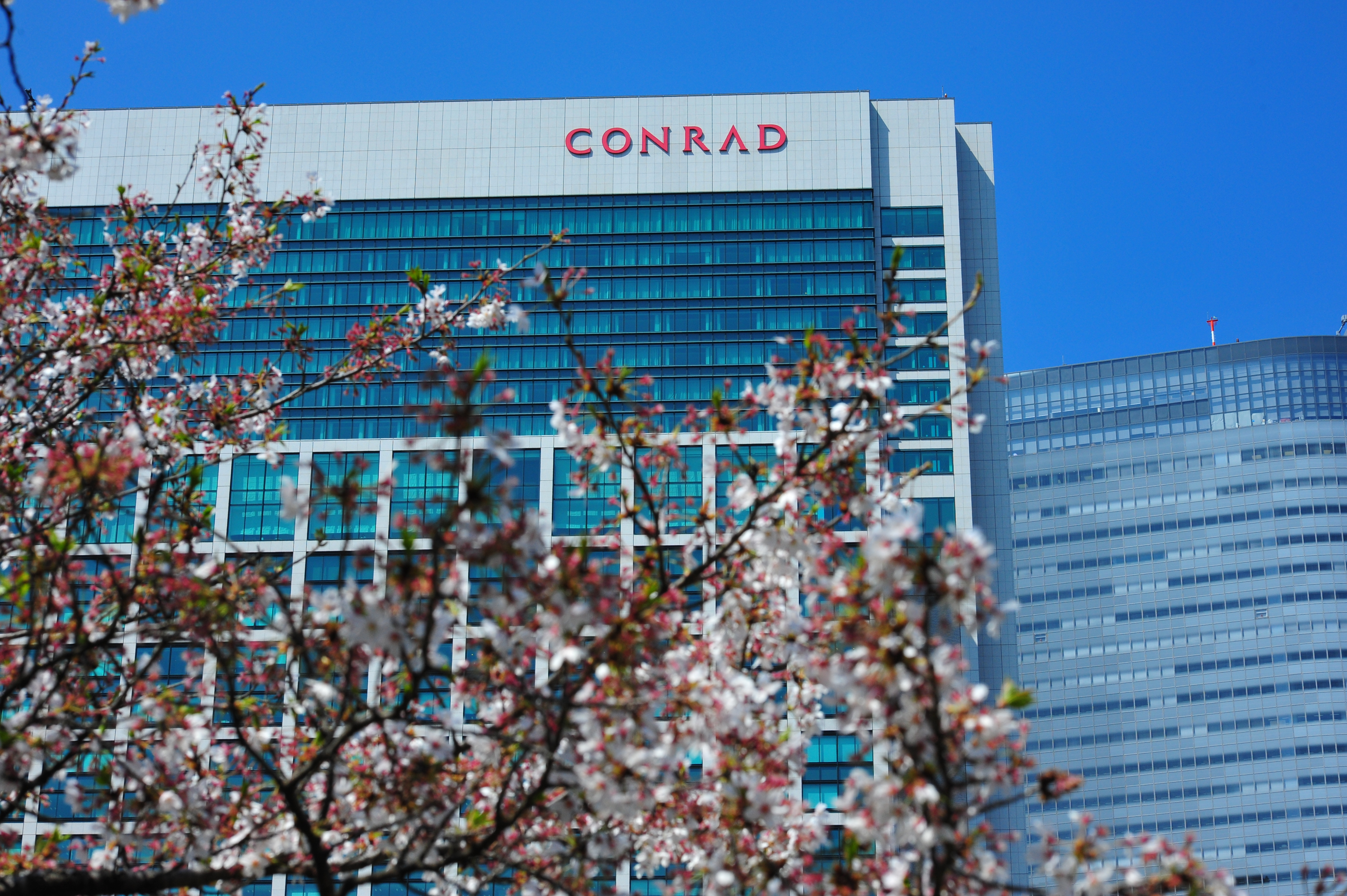
Conrad in Tokyo

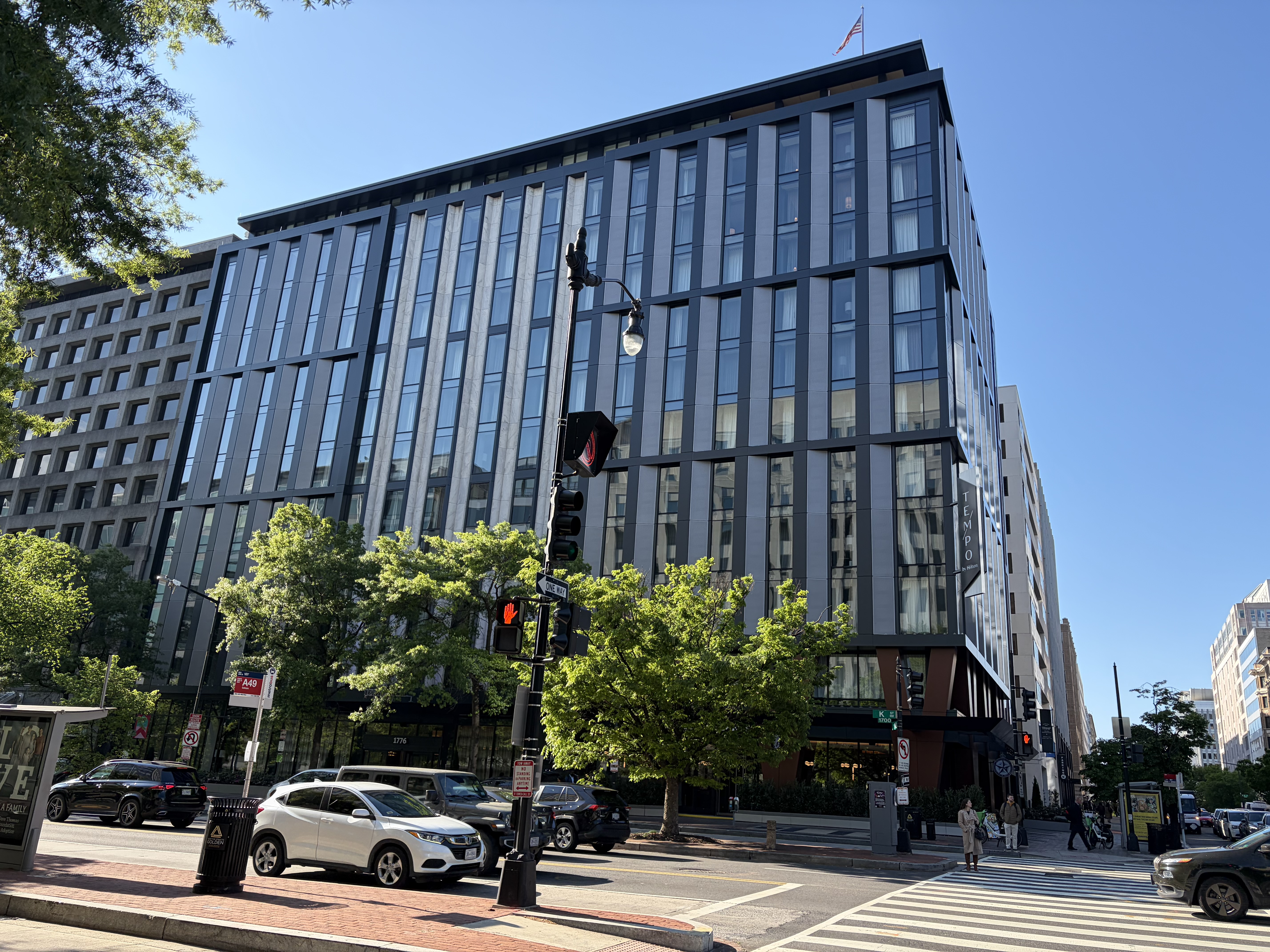
Tempo by Hilton in Washington, D.C.

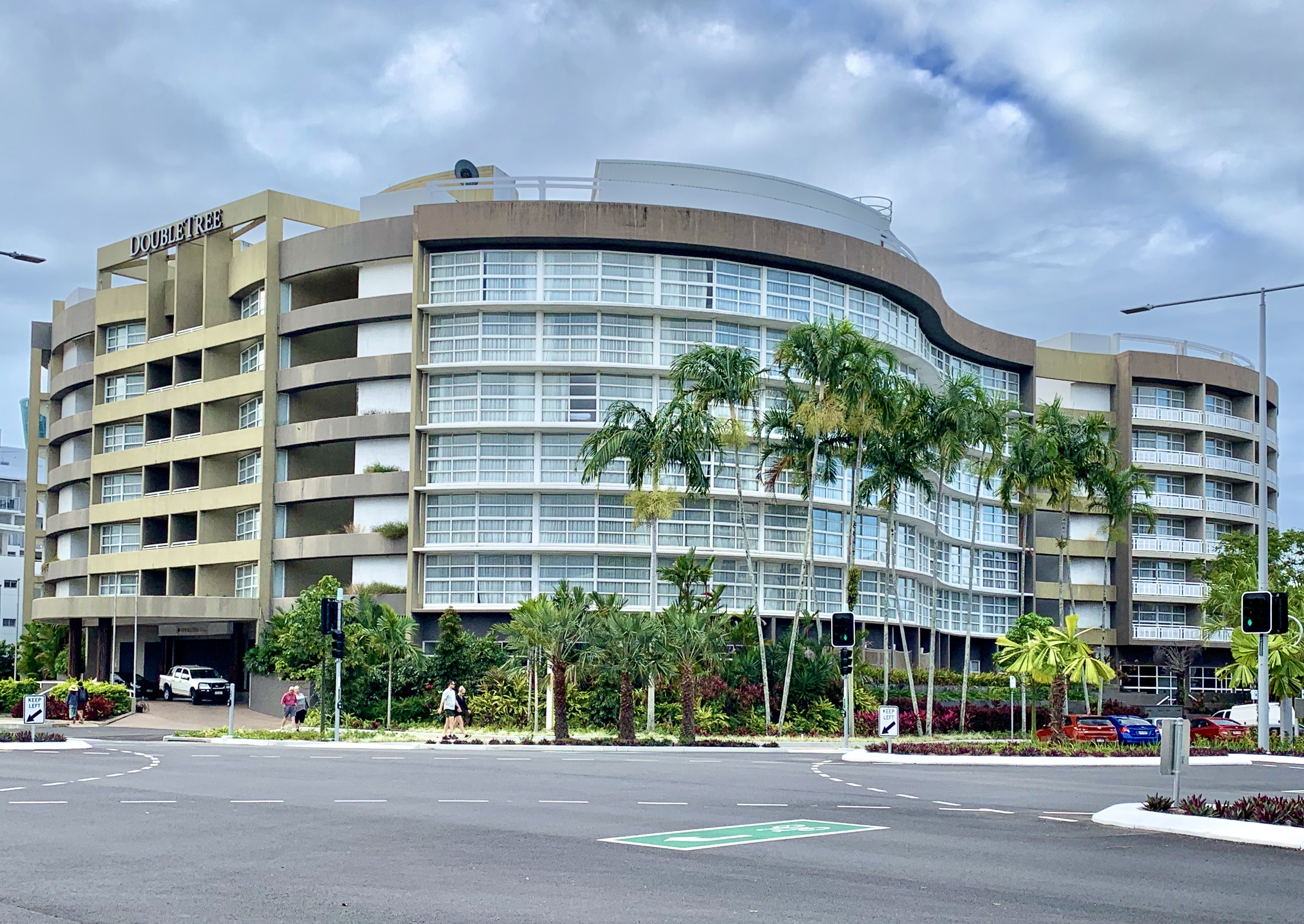
Doubletree by Hilton in Cairns

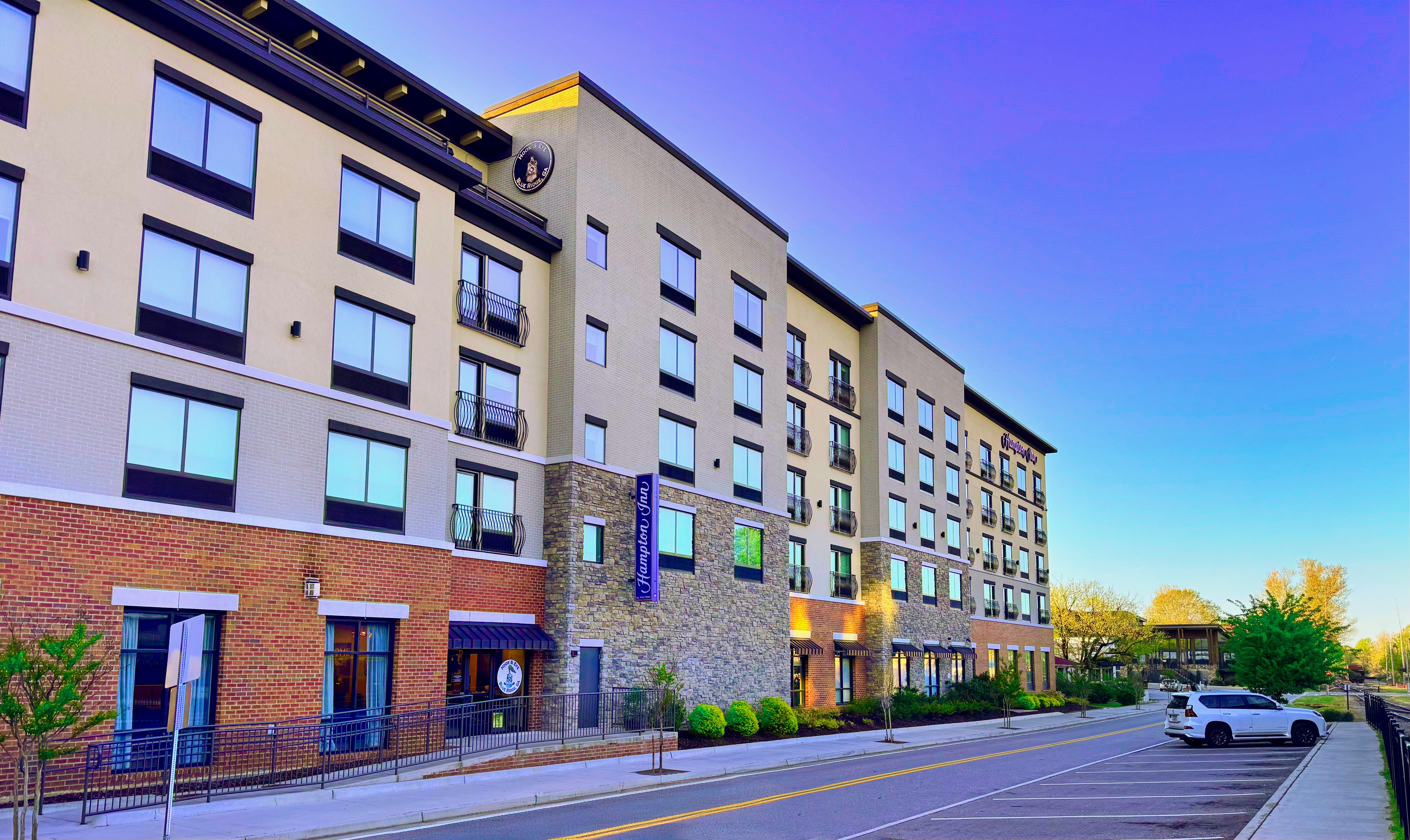
Hampton by Hilton in Blue Ridge, Georgia

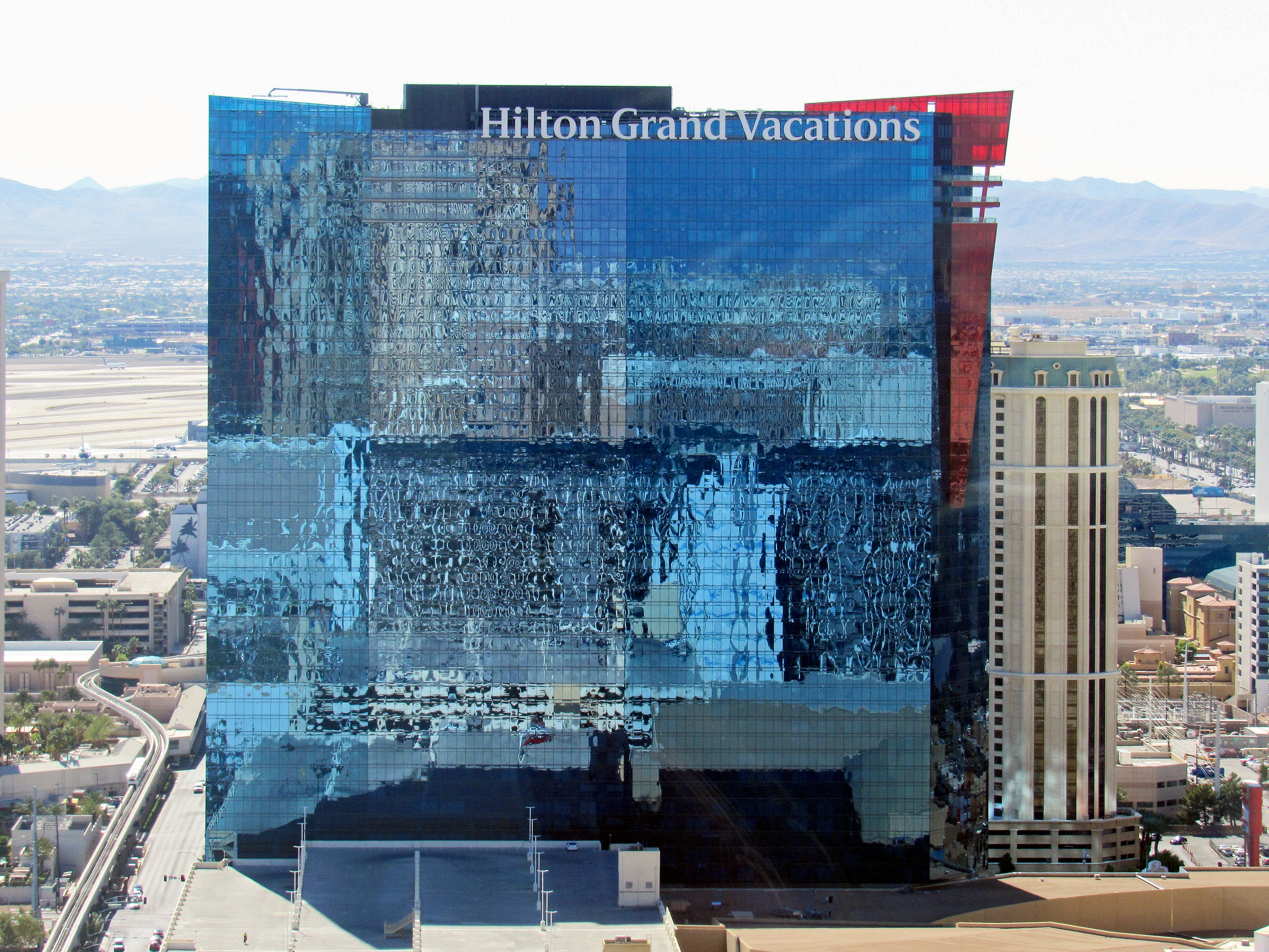
Hilton Grand Vacations in Las Vegas

== Corporate affairs ==
=== Head offices ===
The company has its headquarters in Tysons, Virginia, and an operations center in Memphis. Its Asia-Pacific operations are managed out of Singapore, its Middle East and Africa operations are managed out of Dubai, and its European operations are based in Watford, UK.

=== Loyalty program ===
Hilton Honors (formerly Hilton HHonors) is Hilton's guest loyalty program, through which frequent guests can accumulate points and airline miles by staying within the Hilton portfolio. The program has approximately 195 million members. There are four levels of elite status within the Hilton Honors program including Member, Silver, Gold, and Diamond. Hilton points average a value of 0.58¢ each. Hilton renamed the Hilton HHonors program to Hilton Honors in February 2017.

Recent changes announced in September 2025 include significantly increased redemption point costs at luxury and peak-rate Hilton properties (for example, Waldorf Astoria Maldives rising from 190,000 to 250,000 points per night), limited promotional bonuses for elite statuses, and broader concerns among members that benefits are becoming harder to access without high rates of spending.

== Sustainability ==
=== Animal welfare ===
In 2015, Hilton committed to sourcing 100% cage-free eggs by December 31, 2017, and sourcing pork products without gestation crates by December 31, 2018.

== Controversies ==
=== Lodging of ICE officers ===
NYPD Strategic Response Group blocks protesters outside while police escort arrestees from Hilton TriBeCa hotel to jail truck

In January 2026, Hilton withdrew franchise status from a Minneapolis franchisee that sought to prevent United States Immigration and Customs Enforcement (ICE) from staying in their hotel, sparking controversy and allegations of complicity.

Financial advice expert Ramit Sethi organized a boycott of Hilton properties and asked his fans to cancel their reservations. Minnesota residents also protested several times late at night where a large number of ICE agents were reportedly staying, playing drums and making noise to disrupt sleeping agents inside. Similarly, civil rights attorneys organized a campaign to have Hilton Honors members cancel their accounts in protest of Hilton, accusing the company of being complicit in ICE's actions.

After the killing of Alex Pretti, protesters occupied a Hilton hotel in New York City that protesters believed lodged ICE officers resulting in dozens of arrests.

== Hilton in popular culture ==
- Keith Richards and Mick Jagger performed in the East Penthouse on the 45th floor of the New York Hilton on October 28, 1965.
- On the rotating wheel space station in Stanley Kubrick's 1968 film 2001: A Space Odyssey, a receptionist is shown sitting at the entrance to the Hilton Space Station 5.
- John Lennon and Yoko Ono honeymooned in the presidential suite at the Hilton Amsterdam, where they hosted one of their famous "Bed-Ins" for a full week in 1969.
- In 1971, Diamonds Are Forever was filmed at the Las Vegas Hilton.
- On April 3, 1973, Dr. Martin Cooper made the world's first cell phone call in front of the New York Hilton Midtown. A press conference was held at the hotel later that day to mark the milestone.
- In 1976, during a music tour, Ike and Tina Turner were staying at the Statler Hilton (now the Statler Hotel & Residences) in downtown Dallas when Tina decided to leave Ike. Her moments of getting away from Ike and fleeing the hotel were included in her book I, Tina and in the movie What's Love Got to Do with It.
- The Bodyguard with Whitney Houston and Kevin Costner was filmed at the Fontainebleau Hilton in Miami in 1992. On February 11, 2012, Houston died in her bathtub in Suite 434 of the Beverly Hilton after a drug overdose. Hotel management has since renovated the room.
- In 1995, the James Bond movie GoldenEye was filmed at the Langham Hilton.
- The Insider was filmed in 1999 at the Seelbach Hilton.
- In 2006, several movies including Spider-Man 3, Michael Clayton, and American Gangster were filmed at the New York Hilton.
- Conrad Hilton (played by actor Chelcie Ross) features as a major character in the third season of Mad Men, as lead character Don Draper creates a series of ad campaigns for Hilton Hotels. The Drapers travel during one episode to the Cavalieri Hilton in Rome, though the scenes were actually shot at the Dorothy Chandler Pavilion in Los Angeles.
- Hilton Hotel is featured in Mukoma wa Ngugi's crime fiction novel, Nairobi Heat.
- A fictional Hilton Hotel named Hilton Island Nublar Resort appears in the 2015 film Jurassic World.
