= Hilton Worldwide ICE lodging controversy =

2026 controversy over hospitality company supporting ICE

Hilton Worldwide has supported Immigration and Customs Enforcement (ICE) during the second Trump administration by allowing federal agents to stay in its hotels. This has sparked protests, including the occupation of one of their hotels in New York City which resulted in dozens of arrests.

== Hilton Worldwide ==
Hilton Worldwide Holdings Inc. is an American multinational hospitality company that manages and franchises a broad portfolio of hotels, resorts, and timeshare properties. Founded by Conrad Hilton in May 1919, the company is now led by Christopher J. Nassetta. Hilton is headquartered in Tysons, Virginia, United States.

== Lodging of ICE agents ==
In January 2026, Hilton withdrew franchise status from a Minneapolis franchisee that sought to prevent United States Immigration and Customs Enforcement (ICE) from staying in their hotel, sparking controversy and allegations of complicity.

Financial advice expert Ramit Sethi organized a boycott of Hilton properties and asked his fans to cancel their reservations. Minnesota residents also protested several times late at night where a large number of ICE agents were reportedly staying, playing drums and making noise to disrupt sleeping agents inside. Similarly, civil rights attorneys organized a campaign to have Hilton Honors members cancel their accounts in protest of Hilton, accusing the company of being complicit in ICE's actions.

== Early 2026 background ==
In January 2026, widespread progressive and left-wing community- and immigrant-led protests escalated throughout the United States challenging violence by federal immigration enforcement agents (primarily ICE, with other incidents involving CBP). The protests were ignited by a series of shootings and killings by officers including the killing of activist Renée Good, the shooting of two unarmed people in Portland, and the killing of healthcare worker Alex Pretti. Protests continued throughout the year and were later fueled by the killings of Lorenzo Salgado Araujo and Johan Sebastián Durán Guerrero in July.

Most protesters engaged in peaceful demonstrations (including the largest single-day protest in American history), while other protesters have physically confronted ICE agents and police, often using black bloc tactics and obstructing ICE vehicles to impair the federal government's ability to detain and deport immigrants. Protesters have on multiple occasions slashed the tires of ICE vehicles.

There have been hundreds of arrests across the country, including at least 30 arrests in Minnesota during Operation Metro Surge, at least six during the Portland, Oregon protests, at least 74 in New York City, and at least 90 in New Jersey during the Delaney Hall hunger strike and protests. Journalists have been increasingly harmed or criminally charged during their coverage of the protests, which has received widespread condemnation from advocacy groups including the Committee to Protect Journalists and the Society of Professional Journalists, while French organization Reporters Without Borders characterized local and federal government responses to some protests as "repression typical of an authoritarian regime."

The protests are a continuation of protests from the previous year against a newly-elected Trump's aggressive immigration policy — most notably the Los Angeles protests in June and the Operation Midway Blitz protests in September.

== Protests ==
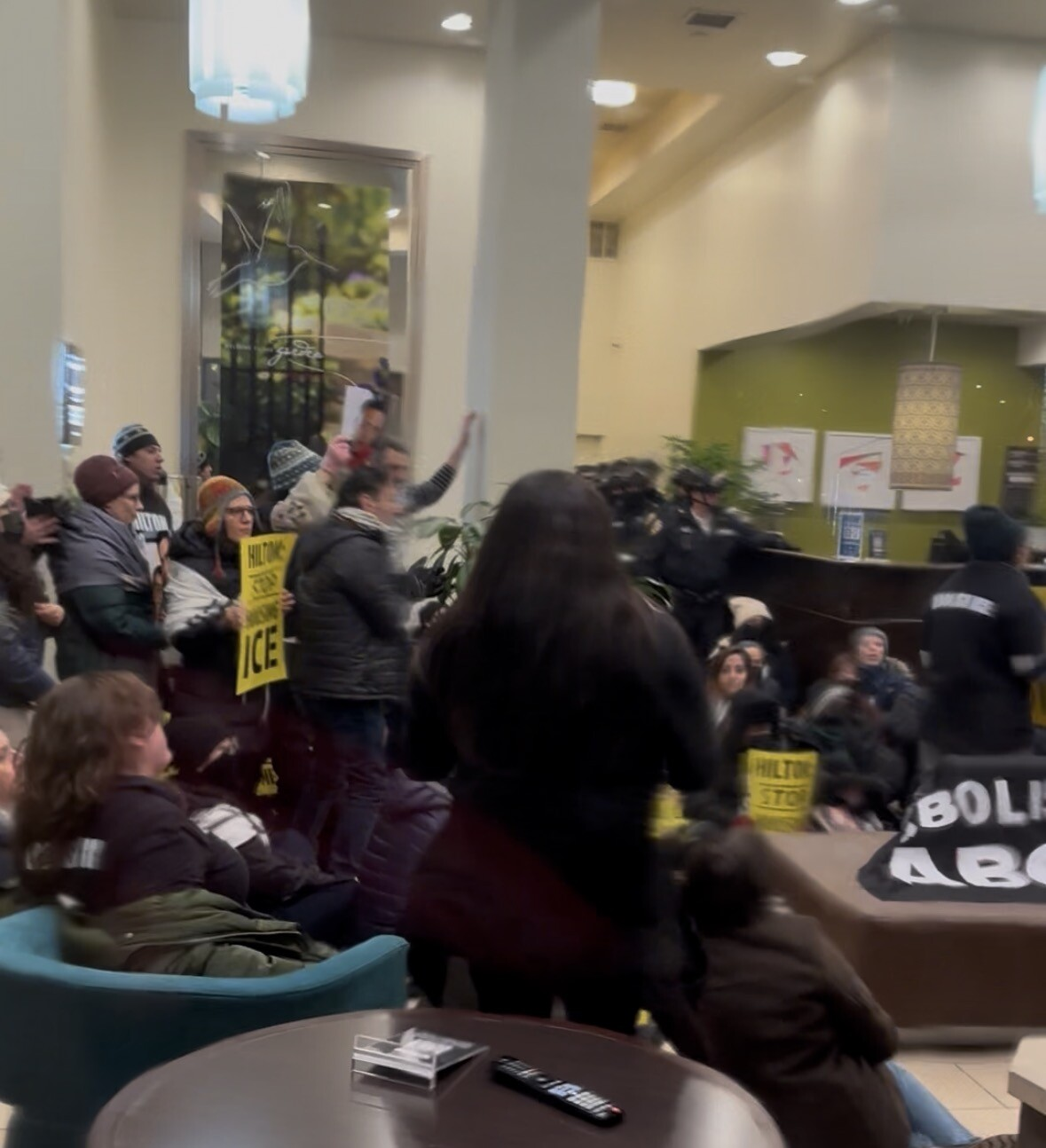
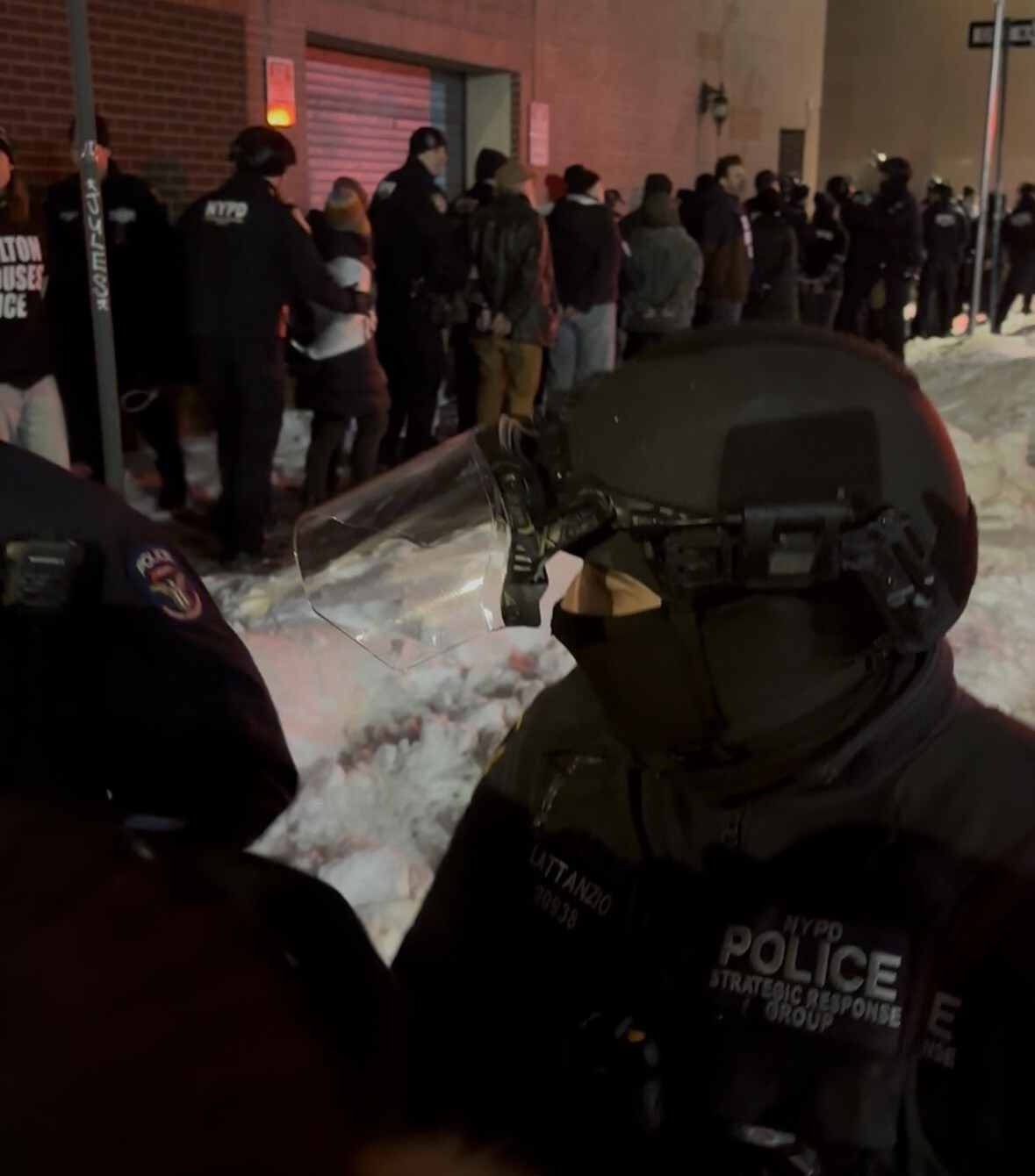
- Protesters in the Tribeca hotel (top left)
- Protesters chant outside the hotel (top right)
- NYPD Strategic Response Group blocks protesters outside while police escort arrestees from Tribeca hotel to jail truck (bottom row)

On January 27, 2026, three days after the killing of Alex Pretti, dozens of protesters in New York City occupied the lobby of a Tribeca Hilton hotel. Protesters alleged federal immigration agents had previously lodged there.

More than 100 protesters entered the hotel on Sixth Avenue near Canal Street at about 6pm wearing black T-shirts with anti-ICE slogans. Protesters from a separate anti-ICE rally gathered outside to show support and police surveillance drones circled overhead. At 6:35pm, officers entered the lobby and warned protesters to leave or face arrest. Many protesters left, and reporters were forced to leave the lobby. About 50 to 70 protesters remained and at 7:30pm, the Strategic Response Group (SRG) began making arrests, lifting protesters off the floor, zip tying their hands, and bringing them to a jail bus.

Protests remained outside during and after the arrests. They chanted "Which Side Are You On?" Others held signs and banners saying "Abolish ICE" and "ICE out of New York," or banners with pictures of people who were killed by federal immigration agents. One organizer for the protest said "they're [not just] taking people off the streets [...] but killing them blatantly in broad daylight with no due process." A former Minneapolis resident in the crowd said "this feels different. This feels on the precipice of it being a lot more scary."

Mayor Zohran Mamdani praised the protesters for peacefully exercising their rights and the police for their presence through a spokesman.
