= Promus Hotel Corporation =

American hotel management company

- Industry: Hotels
- Founded: 1994
- Defunct: 1999
- Headquarters: Memphis, Tennessee

Promus Hotel Corporation was a hotel owner, management, and franchise company based in Memphis, Tennessee. Spun off from the Holiday Corp. in December 1989 as Promus Companies, the company became Promus Hotel Corporation in 1995 after the firm's gambling interests were spun off as Harrah's Entertainment. Promus Hotel Corp. ceased to exist after its purchase by Hilton Hotels Corporation in 1998.

== History ==
Promus Hotel Corporation's beginnings are tied to the original Holiday Corp., which was based in Memphis, Tennessee. Holiday Corp. owned the Holiday Inn hotel chain, but significantly higher competition in the hotel industry and a 1987 financial restructuring that left Holiday Corp. heavily in debt prompted Holiday to sell in August 1989 its Holiday Inn chain (including Crowne Plaza) for $2.23 billion to Bass PLC, a large British brewing concern. This left Holiday Corp. with several far more profitable core gambling and hotel brands, including Harrah's Entertainment, Embassy Suites Hotels, Homewood Suites, and Hampton Inn. In December 1989, Holiday Corp. spun off its hotels as stand-alone Promus Companies. Promus Companies decided to split the gambling interests it owned from its tourist and business travel hotel chains, and in 1995 spun off its non-gambling assets to the stand-alone Promus Hotel Corporation. Promus Companies then changes its name to Harrah's Entertainment.

In September 1997, Doubletree Corporation and Promus Hotel Corporation announced a merger, retaining the Promus name. Almost exactly two years later, the company was purchased by Hilton Hotels Corporation for $3.1 billion.

Raymond E. Schultz, credited with the founding and creation of the Hampton Inn brand, was President and CEO of Promus from its inception until it was acquired by Hilton.
