= Embassy Suites by Hilton =

Luxury all-suite hotel chain run by Hilton Worldwide

- Embassy Suites by Hilton in Newark, Delaware connected to a TGI Fridays.
- Type: Subsidiary
- Industry: Hotel Franchising
- Founded: 1983; 43 years ago
- Founder: Promus Hotel Corporation
- Number of locations: 257 (December 31, 2019)
- Area served: United States, Canada, Latin America, the Caribbean, and the Middle East
- Parent: Hilton Worldwide
- Website: embassysuites.com

Embassy Suites by Hilton is a chain of all-suite hotels trademarked by Hilton Worldwide. As of December 2019, there are 257 locations in five countries and territories with 59,712 rooms. Similar to other Hilton brands, 212 Embassy Suites hotels are independently owned and operated by franchisees with 47,930 rooms, while 45 locations are managed with 11,782 rooms.

== History ==
The Embassy Suites hotel chain was founded in 1983 by Hervey Feldman and Mike Rose, Holiday Inn Corporation's CEO. Feldman was the president and CEO of Embassy Suites until 1990, after which he served as executive chairman until 1992. The first Embassy Suites hotel opened in 1984 in Overland Park, Kansas. In 1986, Embassy Suites built two hotels in Fort Lauderdale, Florida, one costing $28 million and the other $38 million.

In 1989, just 6 years after its founding, Embassy Suites was named one of Fortune's "Best Companies for Customer Service." In 1990, the parent company of Embassy Suites became The Promus Companies Incorporated. Embassy Suites opened its first international property in 1992 in Toronto.

In 1999, Embassy Suites Hotels joined the Hilton Family after the merger of Hilton Hotels Corp. and Promus Hotel Corp. That same year, Embassy Suites was named "Best Practice Corporate Champions in Quality" by the Center for Hospitality Research at Cornell's School of Hotel Administration, and was the recipient of the J.D. Power and Associates "Highest Guest Satisfaction among All-Suite Hotel Chains" award. Embassy Suites celebrated its 25th anniversary in 2009 with the opening of Embassy Suites Minneapolis – Brooklyn Center. That same year, Embassy Suites won “Highest Guest Satisfaction among Upscale Hotel Brands” for a record-setting seventh time.

In 2014, Embassy Suites Santo Domingo opened, representing the brand’s first hotel in the Dominican Republic. The following year, Embassy Suites re-branded to Embassy Suites by Hilton.

== Concept ==
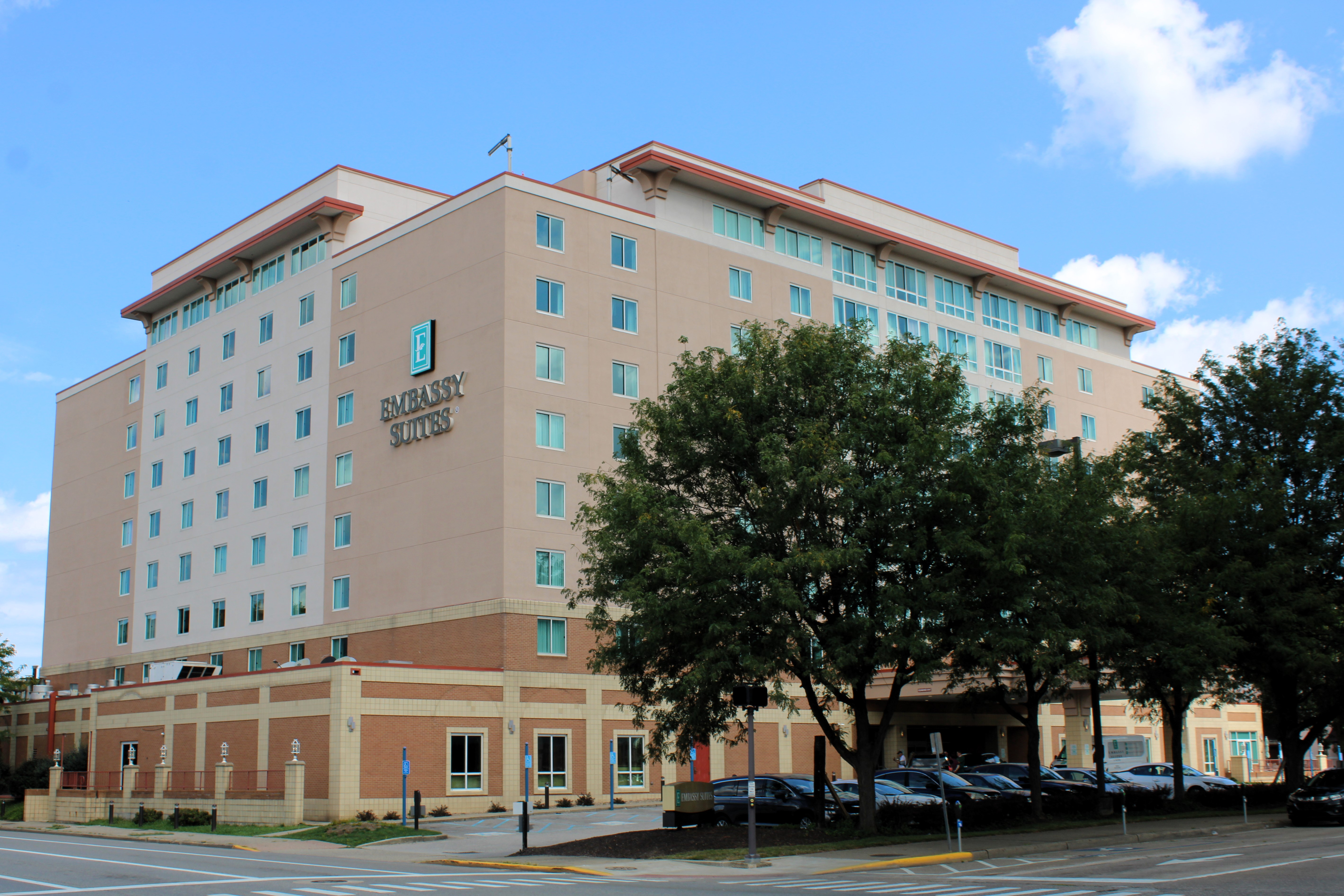
Embassy Suites by Hilton in Charleston, West Virginia

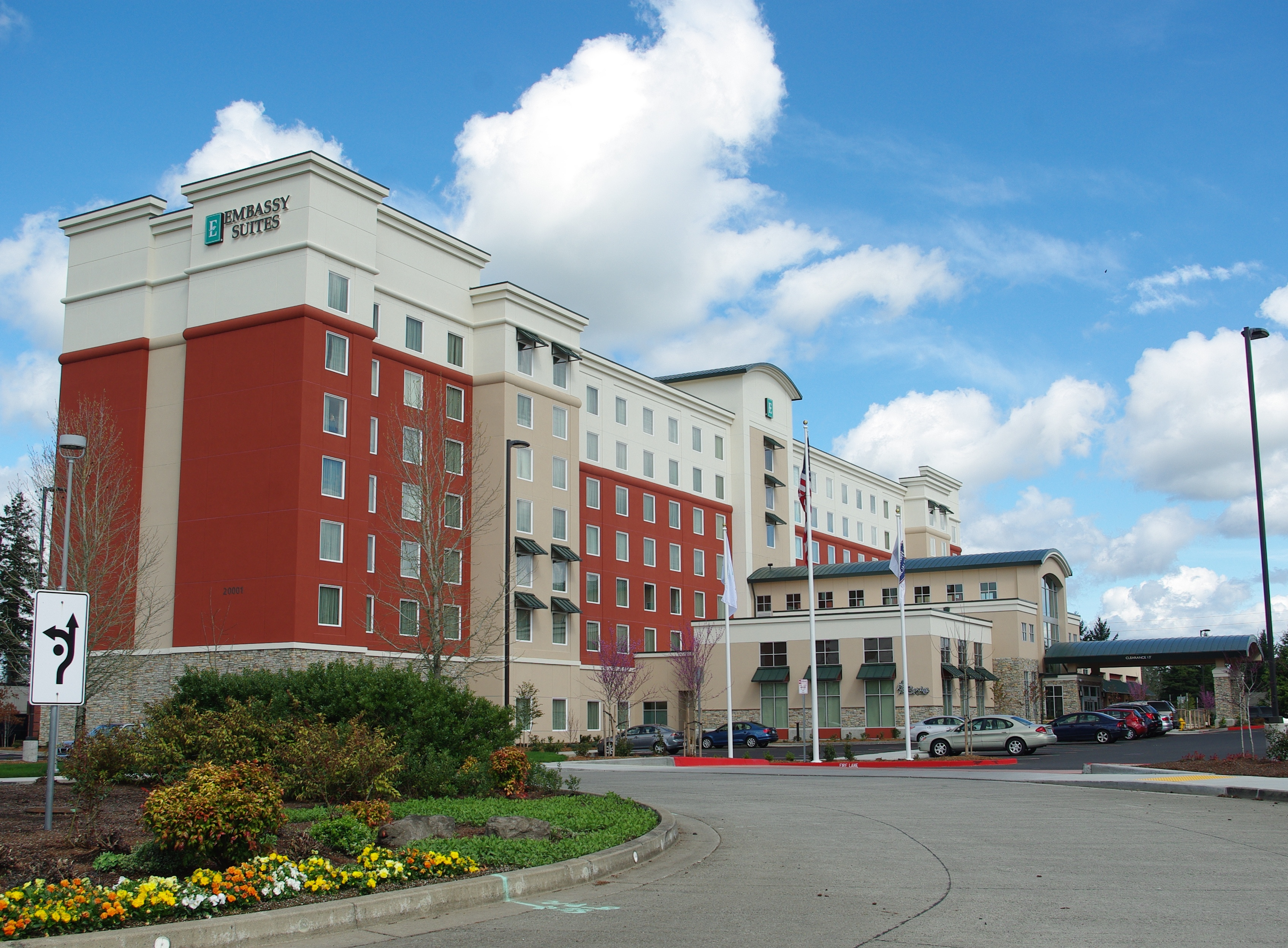
Embassy Suites by Hilton in Hillsboro, Oregon

Embassy Suites by Hilton in Concord, North Carolina

Embassy Suites is a chain of all-suite hotels. All guest rooms of this chain have a separate living area as well as a sleeping area. The majority of Embassy Suites hotels have an atrium-style layout with glass elevators, although some Embassy Suites properties lack this feature. In the evening, an Evening Reception with drinks and light snacks is provided for all guests. Embassy Suites properties also offer a complimentary breakfast featuring made-to-order omelets and other hot and cold options.

== Advertisement ==
In the 1980s and early 1990s, commercials for Embassy Suites featured Garfield along with the slogan "You don't have to be a fat cat to enjoy the suite life". In the early 2000s, commercials for Embassy Suites featured a boy named Austin who described a family vacation at an Embassy Suites Property. In early 2011, Embassy Suites announced a series of three new 30-second commercials, to be aired in major markets beginning in March 2011. The commercials feature the character 'Mr. More' and are directed by Roman Coppola. The series highlights three of the Embassy standards, True Two Room Suites, Cooked-to-Order Breakfast and the Manager's Reception. The catchphrase is 'What's better than getting more of more and less of less?'

== In popular culture ==
- In the season 9, episode 20 of The Office, Nellie says to Pam “Embassy Suites, Do Not Disturb sign on the door, mommy and daddy are on the floor”.
- The 2017 film Spider-Man: Homecoming filmed the Academic Decathlon scenes at the Hilton Atlanta Perimeter Center Embassy Suites.
- In the season 5, episode 4 of Miami Vice, a shoot out scene was filmed in the Miami Airport Embassy Suites location.
