= Budgetel =

Budgetel may refer to:

- Baymont Inn & Suites, formerly known as Budgetel
- Budgetel, a former division of Vantage Hospitality
- The original name of Envoy Inn; see Motel 6
