= Hotel RL =

US hotel brand

- Industry: Hotel
- Founded: 2014; 12 years ago
- Number of locations: 7
- Area served: United States
- Parent: Sonesta International Hotels (2021–); Red Lion Hotels Corporation (2014–2021)
- Website: Hotel RL

Hotel RL by Red Lion is an upscale hotel brand owned by Sonesta International Hotels since 2021, founded by Red Lion Hotels Corporation in 2014.

== History ==
Hotel RL was announced on October 21, 2014 by Red Lion Hotels Corporation as an upscale conversion hotel brand. The brand targets top 80 United States urban markets and is designed to resonate with the customers who have a millennial generation mindset.

The first two Hotel RL's opened in Baltimore, Maryland and Washington DC in August and November 2015, respectively. Several more Hotel RL openings where planned in the future, including at least 4 in 2016 in the cities of St. Louis, Salt Lake City, Spokane, and Olympia, and 1 in 2017 in College Station, Texas.

Sonesta International Hotels Corporation announced the acquisition of Hotel RL Red Lion Hotels Corporation in 2021.
