= Lexington Hotel =

Lexington Hotel or Hotel Lexington may refer to:

- Lexington Hotel (Chicago), now demolished
- Lexington Hotel (New York City)
- Lexington Hotels & Inns, a brand operated by Vantage Hospitality
