= Arch-Con Corporation =

American construction company

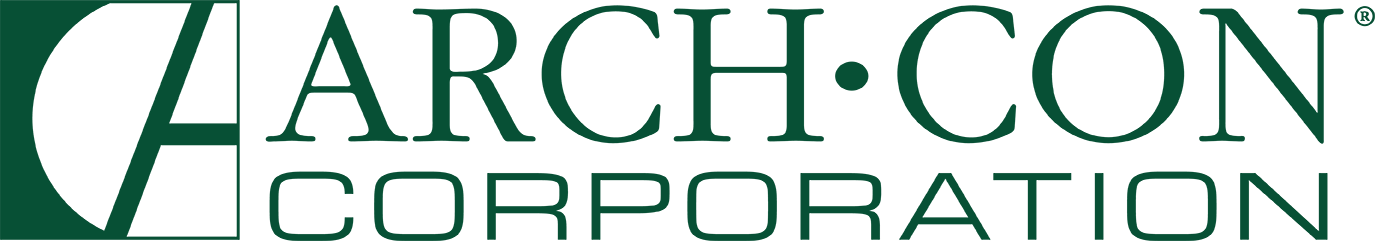
- Industry: Commercial construction
- Founded: 2000
- Headquarters: Houston, Texas, United States
- Key people: Jason M. Cooper (President) Geraldine Pacheco (CFO) Michael Scheurich
- Revenue: $0.5 Billion (2019)
- Website: Official website

Arch-Con Corporation is a commercial construction company based in Houston, Texas. Founded in 2000, most of the company's activities are in the Southwestern United States.

== Overview ==
Arch-Con Corporation was founded in 2000 in Houston, Texas by Michael Scheurich. Arch-Con began in the Houston area, working on commercial projects near metropolitan areas. Its first project was an entrance for Continental Manufacturing in Houston in 2000, following by a hotel project for Americas Best Value Inn in 2001.

In 2009, the company relocated its main office to West Gray near River Oaks in Houston. The company re-structured in 2010 and worked on medical facilities and the Whole Foods Market at Vintage Marketplace.

In 2014, the company reached $100 million in revenue. Starting from 2018, the company expanded its activity to a number of states including California, Colorado, Arizona and Oklahoma, among others.

In 2019, Arch-Con had $0.5 billion revenue in its annual report.

Due to the severe winter storm and 2021 Texas power crisis, a few of the Arch-Con’s job sites sustained significant damage but the company reported it did not experience any serious economic impact.

== Offices ==
Arch-Con Corporation recently completed construction on a new corporate headquarters in downtown Houston with satellite offices in Dallas (2015), Austin (2020) and Denver (2021). It operates in Texas, Oklahoma, Arizona, California, Colorado, Florida and Louisiana.

== Philanthropy ==
Arch-Con has been involved with charity projects such as Houston-based The Center, SEARCH Homeless Services Care Hub, the American Heart Association and the Northwest Alliance Ministries Harrell Family Opportunity Center. In 2021, the company received a Good Brick Award for restoring the Joseph A. Tennant House, a culturally significant landmark designed by the architect John F. Staub in the Broadacres Historic District.

== Projects ==
- The Mill. (334,218-square-foot)
- Braunfels Commerce Center, San Antonio (651,010-square-foot)
- Quantum 56, North Central Denver (868,360-square-foot)
- Remy On The Trails (200,000-square-foot)
- Southlink Logistics Center (1,000,000-square-foot)
- Home Depot Distribution Center (657,000-square-foot; under construction)
- Regent Square project (600-unit apartment complex)
- Buffalo Heights District Project (742,000-square-foot)
- Park 20 Distribution Center (468,000-square-foot)
- Village Towers(120,000-square-foot)
- Prologis Park Trinity Boulevard (156,000-square-foot)
- 1.5M-SF distribution center near Baytown (under construction)
- Houston Physicians’ Hospital
- Medical Center of Tomball
- Palace Bowling Lanes (88,000-square-foot)
