= William Becker =

William Becker may refer to:

- William D. Becker (1876–1943), American politician and 39th mayor of St. Louis, Missouri
- William J. Becker (1927–2015), American theater critic and film studio executive (Janus Films)
- William W. Becker (1921–2007), American creator of the Motel 6 concept
- William H. Becker (1909–1992), U.S. federal judge

== See also ==
- Wilhelm Adolf Becker (1796–1846), German archaeologist
