= Jameson Inn =

American hotel chain

- Type: Public (1994–2006)
- Traded as: Nasdaq: JAMS (1994–2006)
- Industry: Lodging
- Founded: 1987 in Winder, Georgia
- Founder: Thomas W. Kitchin
- Headquarters: Atlanta, United States
- Number of locations: 119, including licensed hotels and Signature Inns (2006)
- Area served: Southeastern United States and Midwestern United States
- Key people: Thomas W. Kitchin (former chairman and CEO); Craig R. Kitchin (former president and CFO)
- Number of employees: Approximately 1,750 (2005)

Jameson Inn was an American limited-service hotel chain founded in 1987 by Thomas W. Kitchin. The company behind the chain, Jameson Inns, Inc., owned hotels primarily in the Southeastern United States. The Jameson properties typically featured colonial-style architecture. After acquiring the separate Signature Inns chain in 1999, the company also owned larger properties in the Midwestern United States.

The company went public in 1994 as a real estate investment trust (REIT), acquired its related operating company in 2004, and was taken private in 2006. Many former company-owned properties were subsequently converted to other hotel brands, while the Jameson and Signature brand rights passed through a series of owners.

== History ==
=== Founding and early development ===
Thomas W. Kitchin founded Jameson Inns in 1987 after working in banking and the oil and gas industry. The first Jameson Inn opened in Winder, Georgia, that year. The company's initial model emphasized common ownership and consistent standards rather than franchising, with properties in communities with an industrial base.

Kitchin's son, Craig R. Kitchin, joined the company as controller and treasurer in June 1992. He became chief financial officer in February 1994 and president in November 1998, retaining the CFO role. He was appointed to the board of directors on 19 October 2004. A later SEC filing credited him with work on Jameson's initial public offering and subsequent debt and equity offerings.

Jameson completed its initial public offering in 1994 and elected to be taxed as a REIT. Its common stock began trading on the Nasdaq National Market on 27 January 1994 under the ticker symbol JAMS.

=== Signature Inns acquisition and growth ===
Signature Inns was a separate company founded by John Bontreger in 1978. Its first hotel opened in 1981 near Indianapolis, Indiana. Jameson completed its acquisition of Signature Inns in May 1999. The company's announcement described 25 Signature hotels with 2,977 rooms, bringing the combined portfolio to 110 hotels and 7,072 rooms and increasing Jameson's room count by approximately 73%. The brands complemented each other geographically, with Jameson concentrated in the Southeast and Signature in the Midwest. The acquired hotels initially continued to operate under the Signature name.

Jameson Hospitality, the related company that leased and operated the hotels, changed its name to Kitchin Hospitality in 2001. The separate ownership and operating structure reflected restrictions on REITs directly operating hotels. In 1999, Jameson introduced interior-corridor hotel prototypes in Rome, Georgia, and Oak Ridge, Tennessee.

=== Integration, loyalty program, and sale ===
On 2 January 2004, Jameson Inns acquired Kitchin Hospitality from Thomas Kitchin and members of his family. The transaction initially involved 2,185,430 common shares and $1.3 million in cash; 32,064 shares were subsequently returned under a working-capital adjustment. Kitchin Hospitality became a wholly owned subsidiary, and Jameson relinquished its REIT status and became a taxable corporation.

On 1 July 2005, the company launched Jameson Stock Awards, a loyalty program awarding eligible guests company shares valued at 10% of qualifying room charges. Approximately 9,300 participants had enrolled by the end of 2005. In an interview, Thomas Kitchin credited Craig Kitchin with suggesting the stock-reward concept. The program received the Marketing Award for Excellence, awarded through Georgia State University's Robinson College of Business in association with the Atlanta Business Chronicle, in February 2006.

On 22 May 2006, Jameson announced an agreement for an affiliate of JER Partners to acquire the company for $2.97 per share in cash. The announced transaction value was approximately $371 million, including assumed debt. At the time, the system comprised 119 hotels: 107 owned and operated properties and 12 licensed hotels, across the Jameson and Signature brands. The acquisition through a joint venture with Longhouse Hospitality was reported as completed in July 2006, taking Jameson private.

=== Post-sale ownership and rebranding ===
The Jameson portfolio encountered financial difficulties under its subsequent ownership, and Jameson-related entities entered bankruptcy in 2011.

In 2012, Jameson Inn ranked highest in the economy/budget segment of J.D. Power and Associates' North America Hotel Guest Satisfaction Index Study, with a score of 751 out of 1,000 points.

In December 2012, America's Best Franchising acquired the Jameson brand rights, a business covering 12 licensed properties, the Signature Inns trademark rights, and related operating systems from Argila Jameson Brand, an affiliate of JER Partners.

In January 2013, Choice Hotels announced the conversion of 46 former Jameson hotels to its Quality Inn, Comfort Inn, and Econo Lodge brands. Wyndham Hotel Group also announced the rebranding of 56 former Jameson properties under Baymont Inn & Suites, Days Inn, and Howard Johnson. Other licensed Jameson properties retained the name under America's Best Franchising.

In 2014, Vantage Hospitality acquired six brands from America's Best Franchising, including Jameson Inn, Jameson Suites, and Signature Inn. On 30 September 2016, Red Lion Hotels Corporation acquired assets and brand operations from Vantage, including the Jameson and Signature brands.

RLH Corporation's 2017 annual report listed Jameson Inns among its supported brands. In a June 2017 interview, chief executive Greg Mount said that Jameson would not be a focus for new development, but existing properties could retain the brand and continue receiving marketing and operational support.

Sonesta International Hotels completed its acquisition of RLH Corporation on 17 March 2021.

The related Signature Inn brand continued under Sonesta. In October 2026, Sonesta announced the opening of Signature Inn Branson in Missouri, describing it as the brand's 20th property.

== Hotel design and operations ==
Jameson Inn properties were generally white, colonial-style buildings with green trim; hotels constructed before 1998 typically had two stories, exterior corridors, and 39 or 40 guest rooms. Beginning in late 1998, the company developed three-story hotels with interior corridors, elevator access, and 56 to 80 guest rooms.
