= RLH =

RLH or rlh may stand for:

- Run Like Hell (video game)
- Regent Low Height AEC Regent III London bus
- Red Lion Hotels NYSE
- Royal London Hospital
- Rebecca Lynn Howard, American singer-songwriter
