= America's Best =

America's Best may refer to:

- America's Best Franchising, operator of America's Best Inn and other lodging brands
- Vantage Hospitality, operator of America's Best Value Inn
- America's Best Comics
- America's Best Contacts & Eyeglasses
- America's Best Dance Crew
