= Kalispell Center Mall =

Coordinates: 48.19903°N 114.31739°W

- Location: Kalispell, Montana, United States
- Opened: 1986
- Owner: WSPGB Mall LLC
- Num. of stores: 70
- Num. of anchor tenants: 3 (2 open, 1 vacant)
- Floor area: 300,000 square feet (28,000 m^{2})
- Floors: 1

The Kalispell Center Mall is a shopping mall located in Kalispell, Montana, United States. Its anchors are JCPenney and Red Lion Hotels with one vacant anchor last occupied by Herberger's. It also has a casino and a US Bank.

The mall opened in 1986. In 2013, Red Lion Hotels Corporation sold the mall to WSPGB Mall LLC for $11.6 million. In 2014, Starbucks announced plans to open a shop at the mall. In 2017 Herbergers expanded their current 40,000 square feet to 80,000 square feet. A Grand Re-Opening Ceremony occurred their public ribbon-cutting ceremony at 7:45 a.m. Wednesday, Sept. 13. On April 18, 2018, it was announced that Herberger's would be closing as parent company The Bon-Ton Stores was going out of business. The store closed on August 29, 2018. In March 2024, Red Lion Hotels Corp. announced the mall was sold to a Spokane, Wash., company for $11.6 million.
