= List of killings by law enforcement officers in the United States, January 2016 =

This is a list of people reported killed by non-military law enforcement officers in the United States in January 2016, whether in the line of duty or not, and regardless of reason or method. The listing documents the occurrence of a death, making no implications regarding wrongdoing or justification on the part of the person killed or officer involved. Killings are arranged by date of the incident that caused death. Different death dates, if known, are noted in the description. The table below lists 86 people.

== January 2016 ==
| Date | Name (age) of deceased | State (city) | Description |
|---|---|---|---|
| 2016-01-31 | Kelley, Bruce Jr. (37) | Pennsylvania (Wilkinsburg) | Kelley was shot seven times by police Officer Dominic Rivotti and Sgt. Brian O'Malley after fatally stabbing a police dog. |
| 2016-01-31 | Bispo, Joshua (42) | California (Bakersfield) | California Highway Patrol reports that there was a short pursuit during which Bispo brandished a gun. He was shot and killed by two CHP officers. |
| 2016-01-31 | Graves, Jeffry (62) | California (Newark) | |
| 2016-01-31 | Brown, Michael (25) | Texas (Fort Worth) | |
| 2016-01-31 | Ruiz, Juan | Florida (Immokalee) | |
| 2016-01-30 | Sinclair, Jeremy (42) | Missouri (Sugar Creek) | |
| 2016-01-30 | Smith, Charles (29) | Illinois (Chicago) | |
| 2016-01-30 | Alegre, Jose (64) | Georgia (Rossville) | |
| 2016-01-30 | Salazar, Philip (38) | Colorado (Fort Collins) | |
| 2016-01-29 | McClain, Randolph (33) | Massachusetts (Lynn) | After attempting to serve seven warrants relating to violations of restraining orders and threats to a former girlfriend, police officers were led by McClain at about 8 a.m. on a chase from 106 Bay View Avenue through several backyards and across Henry Avenue to the corner of Nichols and Western Avenue. There the former Middleton jail inmate tried to carjack the black Lexus of a woman at gunpoint. He was fatally shot by three arriving officers on the drivers seat after pointing his gun on them. |
| 2016-01-29 | Hiatt, Angela (41) | Alabama (Phenix) | |
| 2016-01-29 | Dew, Christopher (29) | Texas (Irving) | |
| 2016-01-28 | Kalonji, Christopher (19) | Oregon (Oak Grove) | |
| 2016-01-28 | Adams, William (33) | Nebraska (Omaha) | |
| 2016-01-28 | Salyers, Jacqueline (32) | Tacoma, Washington | Salyers was in the driver seat of a parked car, her boyfriend, who had warrants out for his arrest, was in the passenger seat. Officers approached her vehicle with guns drawn. Police say Salyers accelerated the vehicle towards them, which is when they opened fire, killing her. |
| 2016-01-27 | Wilson, Janet (31) | Michigan (Dearborn) | |
| 2016-01-27 | Vandarack, Thongsavanh (40) | Tennessee (Lenoir City) | |
| 2016-01-27 | Bailey, Nathan (30) | Texas (Alvarado) | |
| 2016-01-27 | Bratcher, Johnathan (32) | Tennessee (Memphis) | |
| 2016-01-27 | Flores, Herman (31) | New Mexico (Santa Fe) | |
| 2016-01-27 | Smith, John (27) | South Carolina (Latta) | |
| 2016-01-27 | Scanlon, Scott (52) | Arkansas (Mountain Pine) | |
| 2016-01-27 | Rodriguez, Israel Vladimir (26) | Georgia (Cobb County) | After the unsuccessful attempt by State Trooper Jacob Fields to stop the speeding Chevrolet Silverado of Acworth native Rodriguez, a 10 mile chase on southbound I-75 ensued which ended at around 4 p.m. just north of Delk Road with Rodriguez' pickup truck rear-ending another motorist. In the following exchange of gunfire Fields was shot in the lower abdomen and the ankle while Rodriguez was hit 8 to 9 times. The latter died approx. 10.30 p.m. in WellStar Kennestone Hospital in Marietta. |
| 2016-01-26 | Garcia, Maria (57) | Texas (Brownsville) | |
| 2016-01-26 | Finicum, Robert LaVoy (54) | Oregon (Burns) | LaVoy Finicum, an armed militant and one of the leaders involved in the occupation of the Malheur National Wildlife Refuge, was shot after he fled police at high speed until crashing his vehicle into a snowbank at a police roadblock. Finicum exited the vehicle and was fatally shot after his right hand twice passed close to his left side where police say they found a loaded 9 mm semi-automatic pistol. |
| 2016-01-25 | Schenck, Stephen (47) | California (Hesperia) | |
| 2016-01-25 | Alvarado-Morales, Sergio (38) | Nevada (Reno) | |
| 2016-01-23 | Robinson, Michael (43) | Alabama (Clanton) | |
| 2016-01-22 | Lee, Joshua (26) | Georgia (Augusta) | |
| 2016-01-21 | Norris, Cedric (39) | Oklahoma (Eufaula) | |
| 2016-01-20 | Albert, Timothy (40) | Louisiana (Port Barre) | |
| 2016-01-20 | Lynch, Michael (37) | Texas (Harper) | |
| 2016-01-20 | Sanders, Randy (33) | Alabama (Meridianville) | |
| 2016-01-19 | Valencia, Filberto (26) | California (Stockton) | |
| 2016-01-19 | Jones, Gary (36) | Texas (Dallas) | |
| 2016-01-19 | Grady, Samuel (55) | North Carolina (Statesville) | |
| 2016-01-18 | Redmond, Jim (28) | Georgia (Valdosta) | |
| 2016-01-18 | Wilson, Levi (39) | Arizona (Phoenix) | |
| 2016-01-18 | Katsouras, Vasilios (29) | California (Union City) | |
| 2016-01-18 | Provost, Eric (28) | Florida (Orlando) | |
| 2016-01-18 | Caruthers, Timothy (27) | Oregon (Medford) | |
| 2016-01-18 | Szymanski, Jordan (33) | Arizona (Tucson) | |
| 2016-01-18 | Shaver, Daniel (26) | Arizona (Mesa) | Shaver was shot dead in a fifth-floor hallway of the La Quinta Inn after reports of a man brandishing a rifle outside a window were called. Shaver was reportedly shot five times in the neck and shoulders by Officer Philip Mitchell Brailsford. In March, Brailsford was charged with second-degree murder for the shooting of Shaver. On December 7, 2017, Brailsford was found not guilty and acquitted of all charges related to Shaver's death. |
| 2016-01-17 | West, Crayton (52) | Missouri (St. Louis) | |
| 2016-01-17 | Fielding, Joshua (38) | Alabama (Rainbow City) | |
| 2016-01-17 | King, Talmadge (47) | Florida (Jacksonville) | |
| 2016-01-17 | Herrera, Efrain (24) | California (Los Angeles) | |
| 2016-01-17 | Henderson, Cory (31) | Utah (Holladay) | Officer Douglas Barney and another officer were shot by Henderson, who was then shot by police. |
| 2016-01-16 | Hauser, Kelsey Rose (25) | California (El Cajon) | |
| 2016-01-16 | Bennett, Henry (19) | Florida (Belle Glade) | |
| 2016-01-16 | Morris, Ashton (27) | Texas (San Antonio) | |
| 2016-01-16 | Karjalainen, Adam (44) | Oregon (Beaverton) | |
| 2016-01-16 | Longoria, Alfred (34) | California (Los Angeles) | |
| 2016-01-16 | Layfield Jr., Clarence (55) | West Virginia (Petroleum) | A trooper attempted to stop a suspected drunk driver in a vehicle without a license plate on Goose Creek Road in Ritchie County. When the driver refused to stop, State Police said a chase started that led to a remote area known as Oil Springs Road. At that point, the trooper exited his cruiser because, a State Police release said, he believed the chase "was ending due to conditions of the terrain." As the trooper approached the vehicle, the driver began driving "directly toward the trooper." It was then that the unidentified trooper shot at the vehicle, striking and killing the driver, Layfield. |
| 2016-01-15 | Bentley, Rakeem (24) | Michigan (Southfield) | |
| 2016-01-15 | Waldron, William (26) | West Virginia (Elkins) | The Randolph County Sheriff's Department were assisting the Elkins Police Department to conduct a search warrant on Ward Avenue. When troopers entered the home they found Waldron armed with a shotgun. Waldron then pointed the shotgun at the troopers. The troopers then fired their weapons at him. Waldron was transported to Davis Memorial Hospital, where he was later pronounced dead. |
| 2016-01-14 | Holderfield, Willie (40) | Illinois (Hurst) | |
| 2016-01-14 | Hernandez, Miguel (39) | California (Santa Clarita) | |
| 2016-01-13 | Bearden, Brandon (29) | Tennessee (Sevierville) | |
| 2016-01-13 | Meehan, Timothy (60) | Washington (Cle Elum) | |
| 2016-01-12 | Bean, Herman (49) | Alaska (Anchorage) | |
| 2016-01-12 | Richardson, Keith (58) | Virginia (Norfolk) | |
| 2016-01-11 | Bartley, Alan (56) | California (San Fernando) | |
| 2016-01-11 | Lonergan, Ramone (32) | Colorado (Denver) | |
| 2016-01-11 | Tenbrink, Robert (45) | Ohio (Cincinnati) | |
| 2016-01-11 | Meyer, Ciara (12) | Pennsylvania (Duncannon) | A constable attempted to enforce an eviction order on a man when he allegedly pointed a shotgun at him. The constable fired at the man and the shot passed through his arm and hit his daughter, Ciara Meyer. |
| 2016-01-10 | Lucas, Christine (45) | Maryland (Rising Sun) | |
| 2016-01-09 | Kent, David Jay (37) | Washington (Cowlitz County) | After a high speed chase with two deputies and a patrolman, Kent stopped his vehicle and threatened the officers with a chainsaw. The officers attempted to subdue Kent with a stun gun, which was unsuccessful. Kent was then shot dead by law enforcement. |
| 2016-01-08 | Abernathy, Andrew (50) | Georgia (Acworth) | |
| 2016-01-08 | Olsen, Eric (26) | Wisconsin (Lake Geneva) | |
| 2016-01-06 | Franco-Armenta, Alan (32) | New Mexico (Carrizozo) | |
| 2016-01-06 | Clay, Kenny (34) | Kentucky (Owensboro) | |
| 2016-01-06 | Hollstein, Charles (38) | Illinois (Zion) | |
| 2016-01-05 | Thompson, Albert (28) | California (Ceres) | |
| 2016-01-05 | Murphy, Carlton (33) | North Carolina (Charlotte) | |
| 2016-01-05 | Maher, James (39) | Tennessee (Johnson City) | |
| 2016-01-05 | Zollo, David (54) | Pennsylvania (Upper Darby) | |
| 2016-01-05 | Nelson, Joel Anthony (29) | Washington (Lacey) | A deputy stopped Nelson after seeing him onto airport property. While speaking with the deputy, Nelson punched him in the face, stole his SUV and crashed into another car. The deputy used a stun gun on Nelson while standing on the running board of the SUV. When that didn't work, the deputy shot Nelson in the chest. |
| 2016-01-05 | Bukwich, Stephen John (52) | California (Redding) | Redding Police went to an apartment complex in response to a call of shots fired. There they found Bukwich inside his apartment and talked to him with their car's public address loudspeaker. Bukwich opened his apartment door and shouted about his opposition to recent national firearm legislation. Police used less lethal bean bags and a dog to try to subdue him, but both failed. Nine officers fired at Bukwich with rifles and handguns, killing him. According to an earlier incident with police and reports from his ex-wife and his friend, Bukwich had had mental health problems. |
| 2016-01-04 | Turner, Rodney (22) | Oklahoma (Oklahoma City) | |
| 2016-01-04 | Senegal, Eric Jon (27) | Louisiana (Ragley) | |
| 2016-01-03 | Wallace, Germonta (30) | North Carolina (Charlotte) | |
| 2016-01-02 | Light, Lance (54) | Texas (Sweetwater) | |
| 2016-01-02 | Powers, Lonnie Haskell (37) | South Dakota (Sioux Falls) | |
| 2016-01-02 | O'Brien, Sean (37) | Montana (Livingston) | |
| 2016-01-01 | Sisson, Joshua (30) | California (San Diego) | |

== See also ==
- Death in custody § United States
- Henry A. Wallace Police Crime Public Database
- List of cases of police brutality
- List of countries with annual rates and counts for killings by law enforcement officers
- List of law enforcement officers killed in the line of duty in the United States
- List of law enforcement officers convicted for an on-duty killing in the United States
- List of shootings by US immigration agents
- List of police reforms related to the George Floyd protests
- List of unarmed African Americans killed by law enforcement officers in the United States
- Lists of killings by law enforcement officers
- Police brutality in the United States
- Police misconduct § United States
- Police riot § United States
- Police use of deadly force in the United States
