= Sonnabend =

Sonnabend is a surname, based on a German word for Saturday, along with the more common "Samstag". Loosely translated, Sonnabend means the eve of Sunday. Notable people with the surname include:

- Ileana Sonnabend, art dealer, owner of the Sonnabend Gallery
- Joseph Sonnabend (1933–2021), South African physician, scientist and HIV/AIDS researcher
- Roger Sonnabend, American hotelier
- Yolanda Sonnabend (1935–2015), British theatre and ballet designer and painter
