= Mesa shooting =

Mesa shooting may refer to:

- 1966 Rose-Mar College of Beauty shooting, a mass shooting at a college that killed five people and injured two others
- Murder of Balbir Singh Sodhi, the fatal shooting of a Sikh-American in a hate crime on September 15, 2001, which occurred four days after the September 11 attacks
- Shooting of Daniel Shaver, the fatal shooting of an American man by police on January 18, 2016
