= Shooting of Daniel Shaver =

2016 police shooting of a man in Mesa, Arizona

- Photo of Daniel Shaver
- Date: January 18, 2016; 10 years ago
- Time: 9:20 p.m. MST
- Location: La Quinta Inn & Suites Mesa, Arizona, U.S.
- Type: Homicide by shooting, police killing
- Filmed by: Police bodycams
- Participants: Philip Mitchell Brailsford
- Deaths: Daniel Leetin Shaver, aged 26
- Charges: Second-degree murder: Manslaughter (lesser included offense)
- Verdict: Not guilty
- Litigation: Lawsuit filed by Shaver's parents against the city of Mesa settled for $1.5 million; Lawsuit filed by Shaver's widow against the city of Mesa settled for $8 million

On January 18, 2016, Daniel Leetin Shaver of Granbury, Texas, was fatally shot by police officer Philip Brailsford in the hallway of a La Quinta Inn & Suites hotel in Mesa, Arizona. Police were responding to a report that a rifle had been pointed out of the window of Shaver's hotel room.

After the shooting, the rifle, which was previously assumed to be a lethal weapon, remained in the room and was determined to be a pellet gun. Following an investigation, Brailsford was charged with second-degree murder and a lesser manslaughter charge, found not guilty by a jury, and later re-hired by his department.

== Backgrounds ==
=== Daniel Shaver ===
Daniel Leetin Shaver (December 29, 1989 – January 18, 2016) was a white man who grew up in Nashville, Tennessee, and graduated from Hillwood High School in 2007. He lived in Granbury, Texas, with his wife and two daughters. Shaver was employed as a pest control specialist, and was visiting Mesa for a business trip when he was killed. He was 26 years old.

=== Philip Brailsford ===
Philip Mitchell Brailsford was 25 years old at the time of the shooting. He had been employed with the Mesa Police Department since 2013. He was "administratively cleared" of wrongdoing in a 2015 incident involving excessive use of force during an arrest of three unarmed teenage suspects. Brailsford's father was a police sergeant who had also worked for the Mesa Police Department. Brailsford graduated from Mesa Desert Ridge High School in 2009 and had signed up with the Arizona National Guard before being hired by Mesa Police.

== Shooting ==
According to a police report, Shaver had been staying at a Mesa La Quinta Inn & Suites on business. He invited two acquaintances, Monique Portillo and Luis Nuñez, to his room for drinks. There he showed them a scoped air rifle he was using to exterminate birds inside grocery stores. At one point, the gun was pointed outside his fifth-floor window, prompting a witness to notify the hotel receptionist. Following this, the police were immediately called by an employee at the hotel.

Nuñez left the hotel room shortly before six police officers arrived at about 9:20 p.m. The officers, led by Sergeant Charles Langley, stood in the corridor outside Shaver's hotel room and called out to the occupants to exit the room, but received no response. Portillo later testified that she and Shaver did not hear these initial commands. Police then telephoned Shaver's room and again ordered the occupants to step outside. Shaver and Portillo then walked into the hotel corridor, where Langley gave them orders for several minutes while the other officers, including Philip Brailsford, trained rifles on them. Portillo was taken into custody unharmed.

Langley then ordered Shaver, who was lying prone at Langley's request, to cross his legs. Moments later, he ordered Shaver to push himself "up to a kneeling position". While complying with the order to kneel, Shaver uncrossed his legs and Langley shouted that Shaver needed to keep his legs crossed. Startled, Shaver then put his hands behind his back and was again warned by Langley to keep his hands in the air. Langley yelled at Shaver that if he deviated from police instructions again, they would shoot him. Sergeant Langley told Shaver not to put his hands down for any reason. Shaver said, "Please don't shoot me". Upon being instructed to crawl, Shaver put his hands down and crawled on all fours. While crawling towards the officers, Shaver moved his right hand towards his waistband. Brailsford, who later testified he believed that Shaver was reaching for a weapon, then opened fire with his AR-15 rifle, striking Shaver five times and killing him almost instantly. Shaver was unarmed and may have been attempting to prevent his shorts from slipping down. An autopsy report found that Shaver was intoxicated, (Note: The medical examiner's report indicated that Shaver had a blood alcohol level of 0.27, which would have been over three times the legal driving limit.) which police stated may have contributed to his confused response to their commands.

== Body camera footage ==
Shaver's widow requested that the Mesa Police Department release bodycam footage of the event. The request for the bodycam footage was initially refused. In a recording released by Shaver's widow, purportedly of a meeting between her and Maricopa County prosecutors, she was told that she could watch the video only if she agreed not to discuss its contents with the press. Prosecutors and defense attorneys in Brailsford's murder trial asked that the bodycam footage be sealed. Maricopa County Superior Court Judge Sam Myers granted the motion to seal the footage.

External videos
- Brailsford's bodycam, unedited (5:02) on YouTube

On May 25, 2016, Myers ordered portions of the video released. The released video omitted the shooting itself. The redacted version included footage from Brailsford's body camera up to the time when someone exits Shaver's hotel room and footage from another officer's camera while he escorted a woman from the room. The full unedited body camera footage of the shooting was released by the Mesa Police Department hours after Brailsford was found not guilty of murder and reckless manslaughter.

== Legal actions ==
=== Criminal charges against Brailsford ===
In early March 2016, the Maricopa County Attorney's Office announced it would pursue second-degree murder charges against Brailsford in relation to the incident. According to a statement by the county attorney, "after carefully reviewing the relevant facts and circumstances, we have determined that the use of deadly physical force was not justified in this instance." Brailsford pleaded not guilty.

=== Termination from police department ===
Later that month, the Mesa Police Department fired Brailsford, citing several policy violations and unsatisfactory performance. An internal investigation report revealed that Brailsford had violated department weapon policy by engraving his patrol rifle with the phrases "You're fucked" and "Molon labe" (a Greek expression meaning "come and take it" and associated with the American militia movement). Brailsford had also previously been investigated for body slamming a teenager during an arrest.

In the official police report of the incident, Brailsford defended his actions, saying that by crawling towards the officers (which one of the officers had instructed Shaver to do), Shaver appeared to be "trying to gain a position of advantage in order to gain a better firing position on us". The report stated: "Shaver was co-operative, but sometimes confused by the commands and because of his possible intoxication".

Four months after the shooting, Charles Langley, the officer who shouted orders to Shaver, retired from the department. By December 2017, Langley had emigrated from the United States to the Philippines.

=== Criminal trial and acquittal ===
Brailsford's trial for second-degree murder was originally scheduled for February 2017. A defense motion challenging the state's probable cause to send the case to trial; appeals to the Arizona Supreme Court over the release of controversially redacted footage from Brailsford's body camera made a February trial unrealistic. On February 10, 2017, Maricopa County Superior Court Judge George Foster rescheduled the trial for October 23, 2017. Brailsford faced up to 25 years in prison if found guilty of second-degree murder.

On December 7, 2017, after a six-week trial, a jury acquitted Brailsford of all charges.

Also in December 2017, it was revealed that Brailsford had been involved in a prior incident in 2015 regarding an arrest of teenagers in a store. During the arrest, Brailsford was recorded on video throwing a teenager against a shelf, putting the teenager in a headlock, then slamming the teenager onto the ground. At the time, the incident was publicized (but Brailsford was not named) by a witness to the arrest, who alleged excessive force because the teenagers "weren't doing anything". A spokesperson for the Mesa Police Department said that the department "looked at" the incident and "administratively cleared" Brailsford. The spokesperson further commented that "police work sometimes isn't pretty".

=== Department of Justice investigation ===
In March 2018, the Mesa Police Department confirmed that the United States Department of Justice had reopened the case and was looking into a possible civil rights violation by Brailsford.

== Aftermath ==
=== Bankruptcy and pension ===
In January 2018, Brailsford filed for bankruptcy. According to a pay stub attached to Brailsford's bankruptcy file, he has been working for a steel company in Glendale, Arizona.

In August 2018, Brailsford was reinstated by the Mesa Police Department, staying for a further 42 days in what the department described as a "budget position". The department agreed to reimburse Brailsford for medical expenses related to his post-traumatic stress disorder — the result of his shooting of Shaver and the resultant criminal trial. The reinstatement allowed Brailsford to apply for "accidental disability" experienced during the course of work. As a result, Brailsford was unanimously approved to be retired on medical grounds. Brailsford was also given a pension of $2,500 per month. The fact that Brailsford was ultimately medically retired instead of remaining fired was publicly disclosed in July 2019.

=== Settlements ===
In 2021, Shaver's parents settled with the city for $1.5 million. Shaver's common-law widow, Laney Sweet, was seeking $75 million in a wrongful death lawsuit, and refused to settle at that time. In November 2022, Sweet agreed to settle her lawsuit against the city for $8 million.

== See also ==
- List of killings by law enforcement officers in the United States, January 2016
