= Motel 6 =

US motel chain

- Type: Private
- Industry: Hospitality
- Founded: 1962; 64 years ago in Santa Barbara, California
- Founders: William Becker; Paul Greene
- Headquarters: Plano, Texas, United States
- Number of locations: 1,500 (2024)
- Areas served: United States; Canada
- Key people: Sonal Sinha, CEO
- Brands: Motel 6; Studio 6
- Services: Budget motels; extended-stay hotels
- Owner: Oyo Rooms (2024–present); Blackstone Inc. (2012–2024); Accor (1990–2012)
- Parent: G6 Hospitality
- Website: motel6.com

Motel 6 is an American chain of motels with locations in the United States and Canada. The chain was founded in Santa Barbara, California, in 1962 by William W. Becker and Paul Greene, and derives its name from the fact that rooms initially cost $6 USD (equivalent to $64 in 2025). Motel 6 also operates Studio 6, a chain of extended-stay hotels. Becker and Greene opened their first Motel 6 location on June 1, 1962, at 443 Corona del Mar in Santa Barbara. Since 1986, the chain has also run radio advertisements narrated by Tom Bodett and featuring the slogan, "We'll leave the light on for you."

In 2012, The Blackstone Group acquired the hotel brand from Accor Hotels, and began managing it as part of its real estate business. In September 2024, Oyo Rooms, an Indian hospitality chain, announced an agreement to acquire Motel 6 and Studio 6 in an all-cash transaction valued at $525 million. On December 17, 2024, OYO's parent company, Oravel Stays, announced that it had completed the purchase of G6 Hospitality, which until then controlled hotels under the Motel 6 and Studio 6 brands. Following the acquisition, OYO appointed Sonal Sinha as chief executive officer of G6 Hospitality. As of 2024, Motel 6 and Studio 6 collectively operated approximately 1,500 locations across the United States and Canada.

== History ==
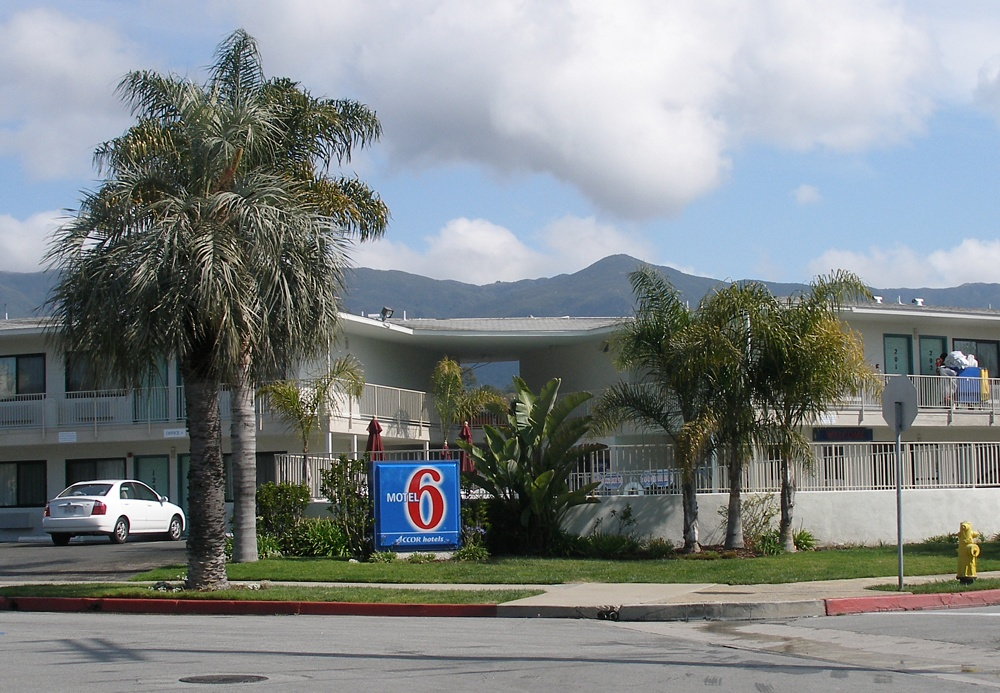
The first Motel 6 in Santa Barbara, California, which remains in business (c. 2006).

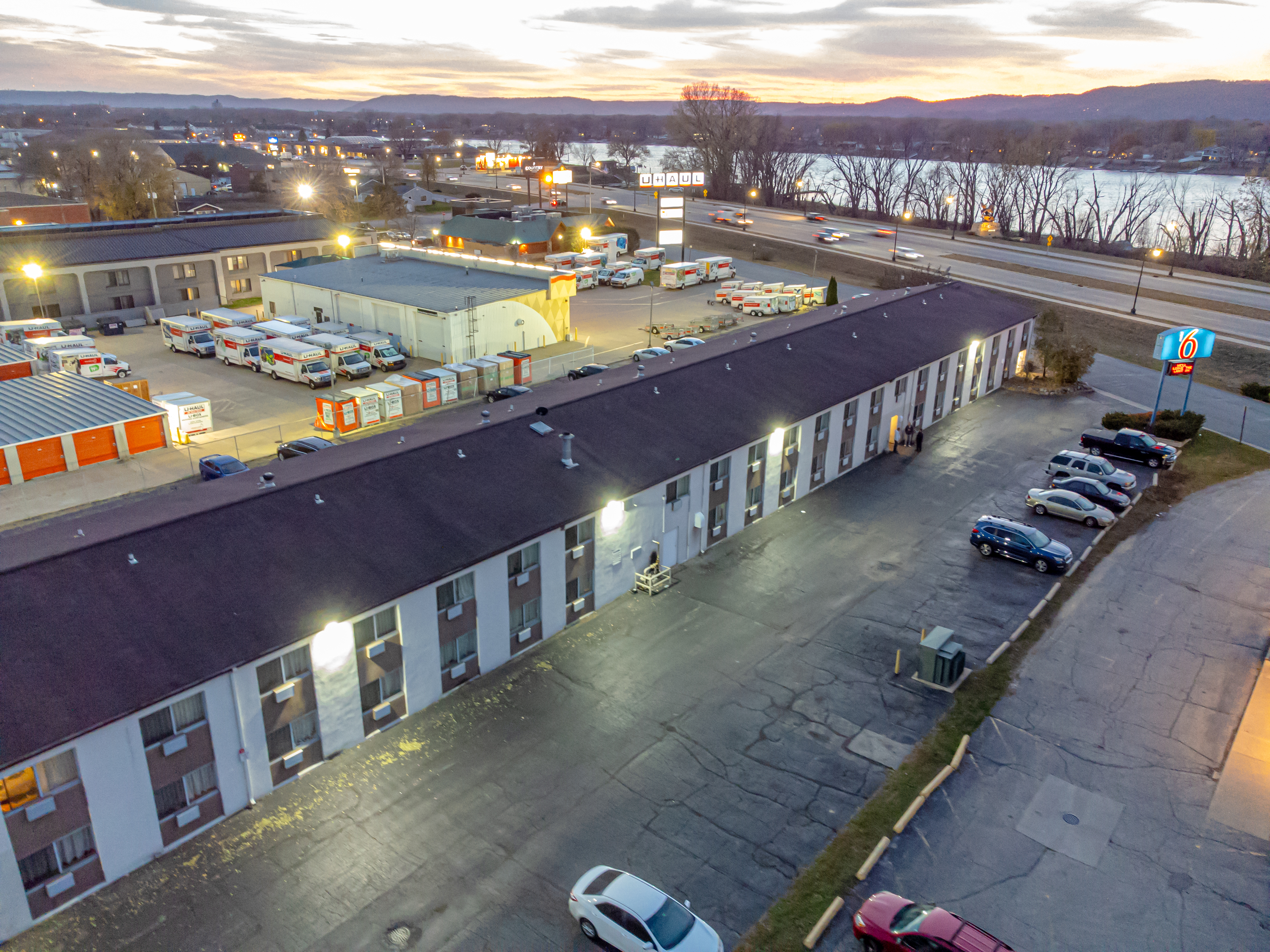
Motel 6 in La Crosse, Wisconsin

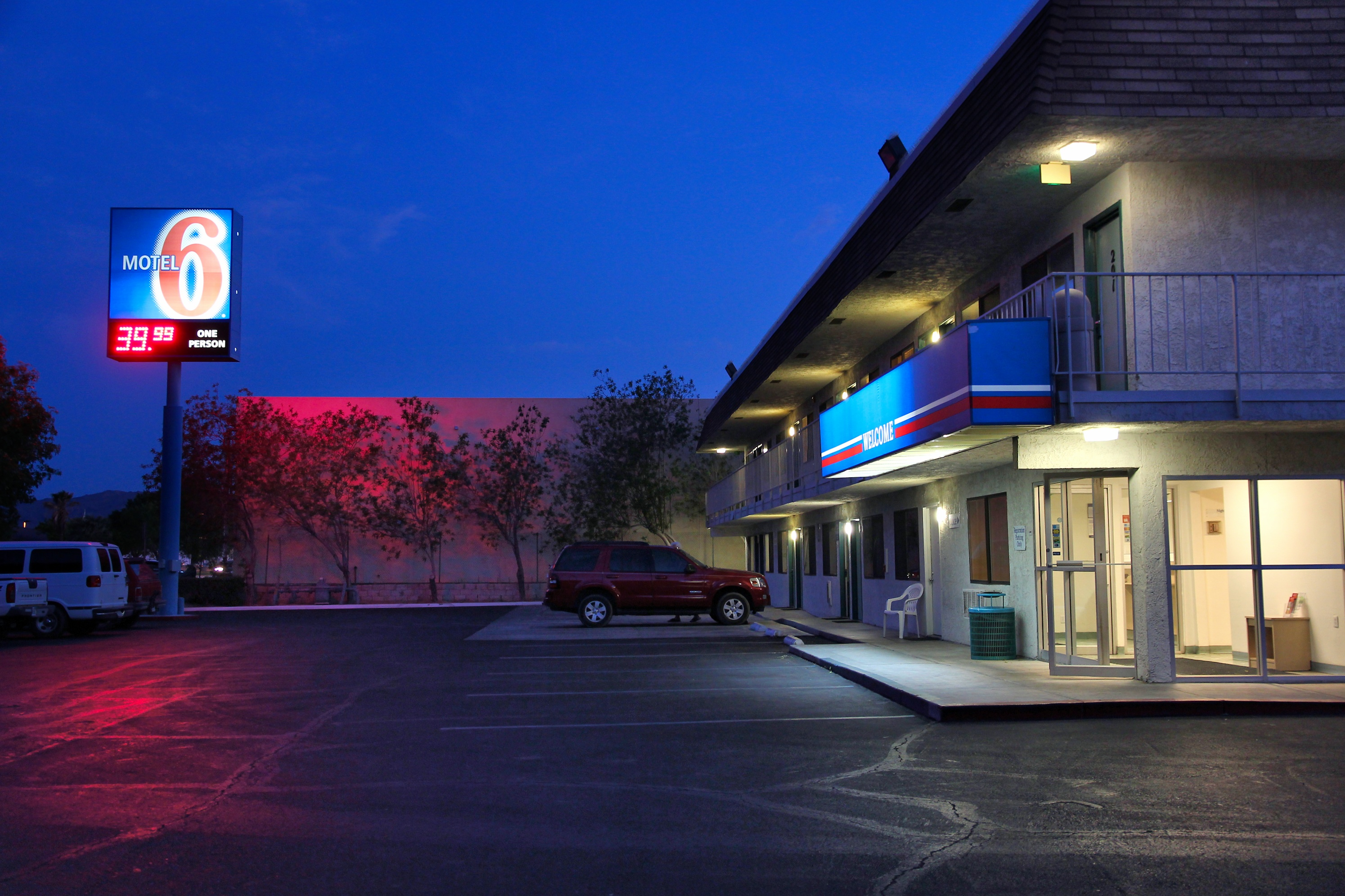
Evening at Motel 6 with visible room price pylon

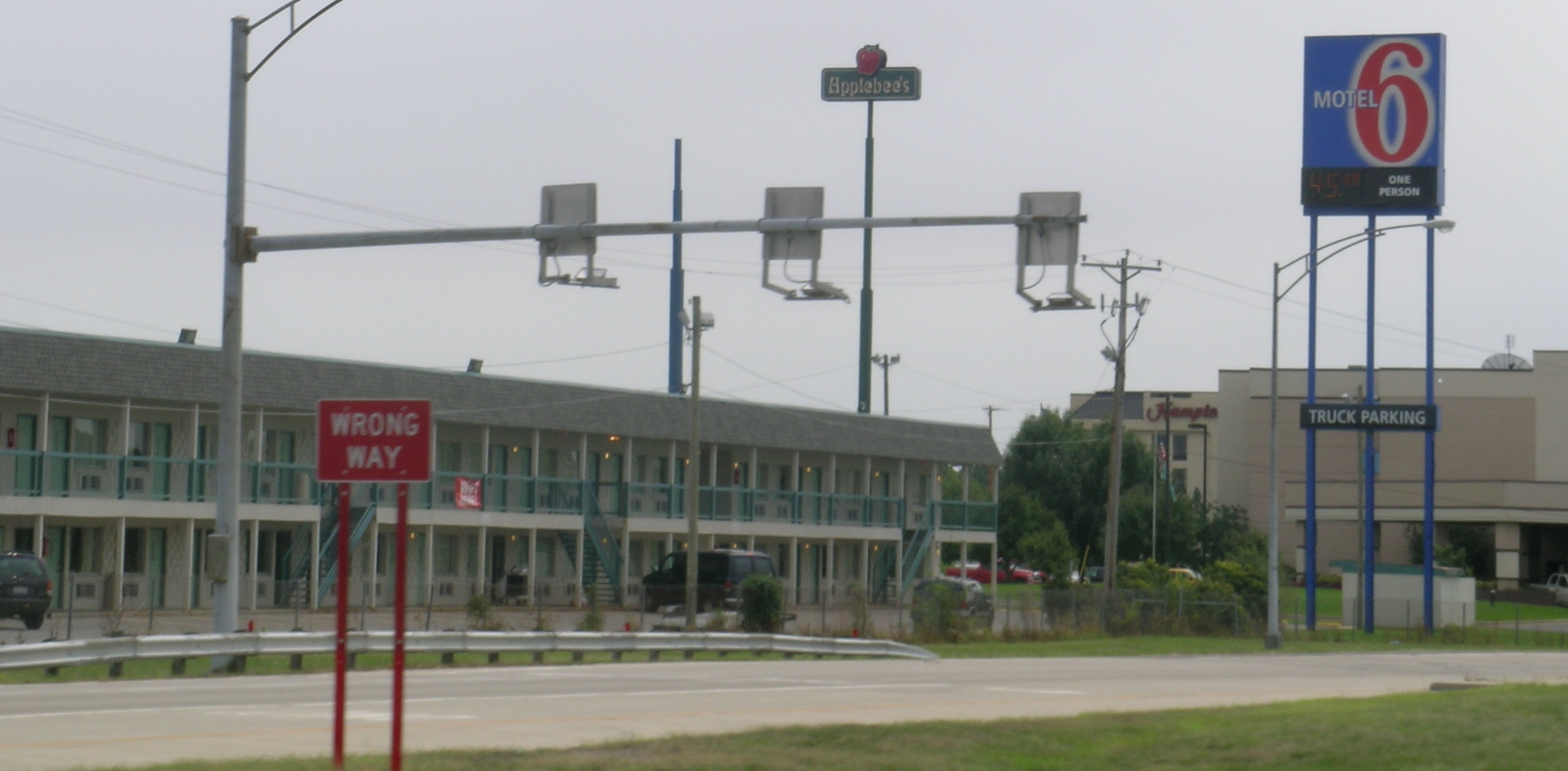
Motel 6 in Lima, Ohio

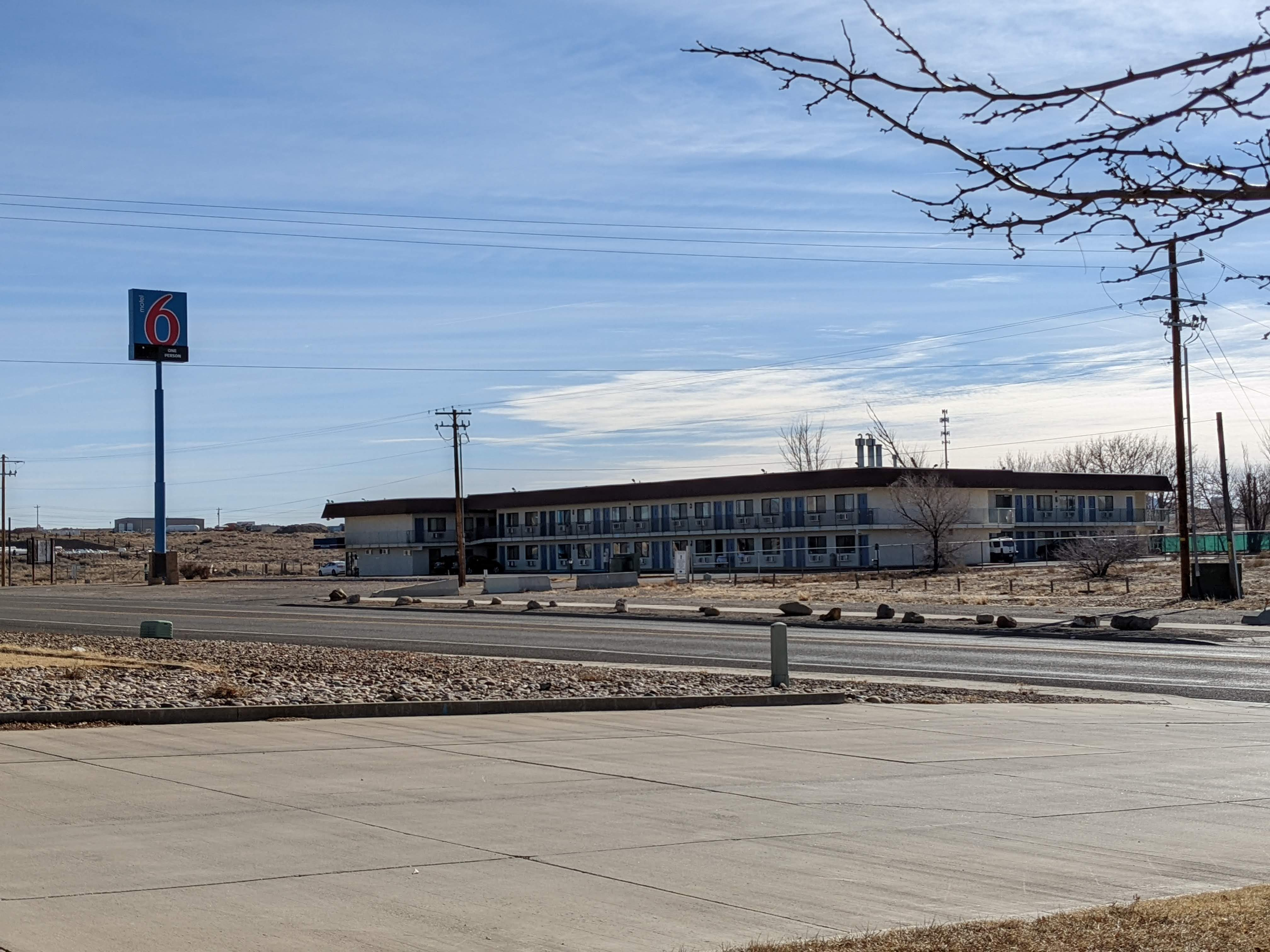
Motel 6 in Green River, Utah

Motel 6 was founded in Santa Barbara, California, in 1962, by two local building contractors: William Becker and Paul Greene. The partners developed a plan to build motels with rooms at low cost rates. They decided on a $6 room rate per night (equivalent to $64 in 2025), which would cover building costs, land leases, and janitorial supplies.

Becker and Greene had specialized in building low-cost housing developments, and they wanted to provide an alternative to other major hotel chains, such as Holiday Inn, whose locations were becoming increasingly upscale in quality and price in the 1960s, after starting out with a budget-oriented concept. Becker and Greene spent two years formulating their business model and searched for ways to cut costs as much as possible.

During the chain's early years, Motel 6 emphasized itself as a "no-frills" lodging chain with rooms featuring coin-operated black-and-white television receivers instead of the free color televisions found in the more expensive motels, along with functional interior decor, to reduce the time it took to clean the rooms. The first location in Santa Barbara had no restaurant on-site, a notable difference from other hotels of the era. To this day, most motels have no on-site dining, though there is usually a choice of restaurants nearby.

As the 1960s progressed, the Motel 6 idea became very popular in the lodging industry, and other chains began to imitate the concept, as Motel 6 was slowly beginning to take a small share of the market away from the traditional hotels. In 1965, Motel 6 opened its 15th property, and first location outside California, in downtown Salt Lake City, Utah. Realizing the need to move quickly, Becker and Green set out on an ambitious expansion program and had opened its 25th location in Gilroy, California, by 1966. The occupancy rate by then was about 85 percent, well above the industry average, and as a result of their success, Motel 6 became an attractive acquisition target. Becker and Greene sold the chain to an investment group in 1968.

In the early 1970s, Motel 6 opened its largest location, Motel 6 Tropicana, in Las Vegas, Nevada. Additionally, the chain moved east and opened a location in Fort Lauderdale, Florida, in 1972. By 1980, Motel 6 had reached 300 locations. It was sold to Kohlberg Kravis Roberts in 1985, who moved the chain away from its "no frills" approach and began including amenities such as telephones and color television.

Market share declined throughout the 1980s, in part because of increased competition from other budget hotels. During this time, it bought out the Sixpence Inn chain in the western U.S., and Envoy Inn (formerly Budgetel and Bargaintel) in the Midwestern United States and Pennsylvania. Regal 8 Motels were acquired in 1991. In 1990, the company was bought by the French-based Accor. In 1993, it opened its first high-rise location—Motel 6 LAX in Los Angeles, California.

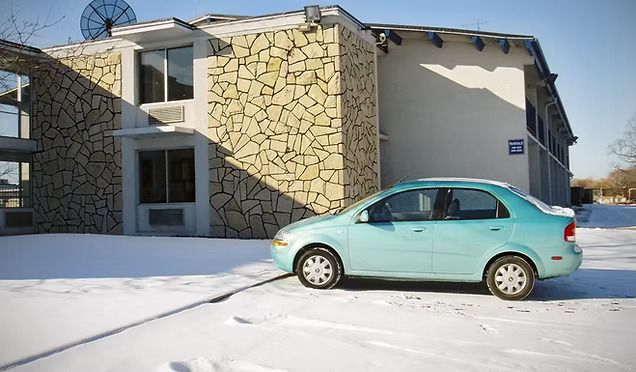
Motel 6 in Milwaukee, Wisconsin

Unlike the majority of hotel chains, Motel 6 directly owns and operates most of its locations. To expand more rapidly outside its traditional Western United States base, the chain started franchising in 1994. Accor management also took over motels that had been franchised by other chains. Motel 6 began to renovate all bedrooms, sold under-performing locations, and upgraded door locks and other security measures. Newer properties, as well as acquisitions, have interior corridors. Motel 6's competitors include America's Best Value Inn, Days Inn, Econo Lodge, Knights Inn, Red Roof Inn, Rodeway Inn, Super 8 and Travelodge. In 1999, Motel 6 launched Studio 6 Extended Stay, hotels with suites that are designed for longer stays and feature kitchenettes.

In 2000, Motel 6 went international by opening its first location outside the U.S. in Burlington, Ontario, Canada. Then, in 2002, Motel 6 celebrated its 40th anniversary at its first location in Santa Barbara, California.

In 2006, Accor and Motel 6 invested more than $6 million in properties to help rebuild New Orleans and Gulfport following Hurricane Katrina. One of the Motel 6 co-founders, William Becker, died of a heart attack at the age of 85 the next year.

The company was sold by Accor to The Blackstone Group in 2012 for $1.9 billion. Blackstone announced that Motel 6 would be operated on a stand-alone basis.

On April 24, 2018, the American Customer Satisfaction Index published a study of America's most popular hotel chains, placing G6 Hospitality's Motel 6 at the bottom of the category for the second year in a row.

As of August 2022, the most expensive motel in the entire Motel 6 chain was the first one in Santa Barbara, California. It had charged $6 per night before taxes for a room when it first opened in 1962. Sixty years later, during the late summer of 2022, the first Motel 6 was reportedly charging $426 per night for a room, before taxes.

In September 2024, Indian hospitality chain Oyo Rooms agreed to buy Motel 6 and Studio 6 in an all-cash deal worth $525 million.

== Controversies ==
=== Warrantless disclosure of Motel 6 occupancies ===
In September 2017, immigration attorneys accused Motel 6 desk clerks at two locations in the area of Phoenix, Arizona, of notifying U.S. Immigration and Customs Enforcement when guests checked in with identification from Mexico. The attorneys said court records showed that federal immigration agents arrested at least 20 people at the Motel 6 locations over the course of seven months in 2017. Motel 6 said the practice was "implemented at the local level without the knowledge of senior management" and every location had been given a directive that they were "prohibited from voluntarily providing daily guest lists to ICE." Motel 6 was sued for discrimination and privacy violations in connection with the case and on November 2, 2018, agreed to settle with the plaintiffs for $7.6 million.

Additionally, Washington state filed a lawsuit in January 2018 against Motel 6 for giving the names of thousands of other motel guests to U.S. Immigration and Customs Enforcement officers. In April 2019, Motel 6 agreed to pay $12 million to settle the lawsuit.

== Services ==
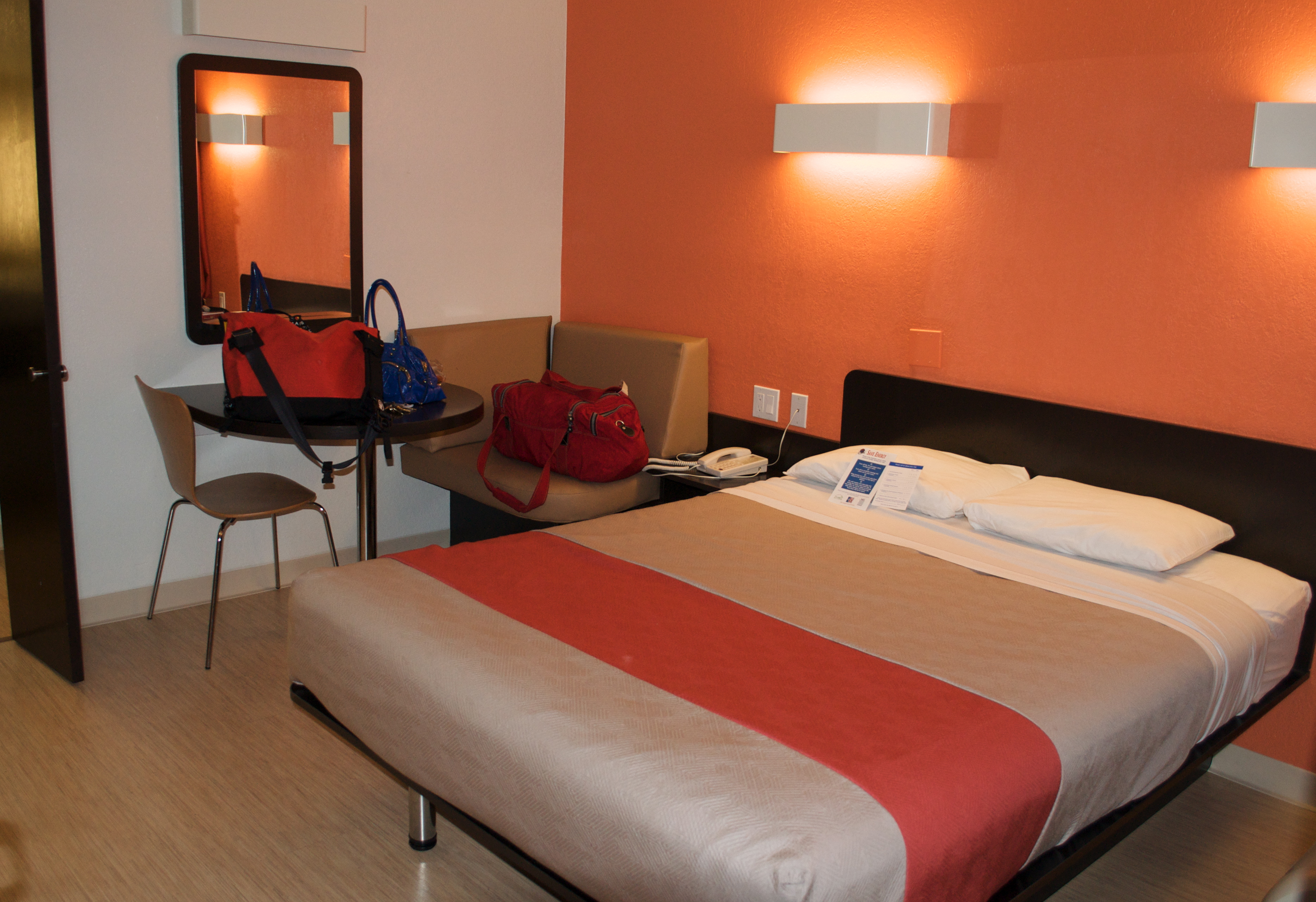
An updated Motel 6 room in Santa Barbara, California

In March 2008, Motel 6 began a system-wide renovation program called the "Phoenix Project" to update the look and amenities of all bedrooms. Before the remodel, most rooms had colorful road-trip inspired bed covers, carpeted floors, shower curtains, CRT televisions and beige furnishings. Stained carpets and dirty shower curtains were a common complaint on online customer reviews. The remodel was designed with an eye towards not only modernizing rooms but keeping room rates low for years to come. Designers accomplished this by making the rooms more energy efficient, easy to clean, and easier to keep clean in the long term (keeping housekeeping and maintenance costs low).

== Advertising ==
Beginning in 1986, Motel 6 has advertised through radio commercials featuring the voice of writer and National Public Radio commentator Tom Bodett, with the tagline "We'll leave the light on for you." The ads were created by Dallas advertising agency The Richards Group. They feature a tune composed by Tom Faulkner, performed by him on guitar and Milo Deering on fiddle. The first spots were conceived and written by David Fowler. In 1996, the ads won a Clio Award. The campaign itself has won numerous national and international awards and was selected by Advertising Age magazine as one of the Top 100 Advertising Campaigns of the Twentieth Century.
