= Knights Inn =

American hotel chain

- Type: Subsidiary
- Industry: Lodging
- Founded: 1974; 52 years ago
- Founder: Cardinal Industries, Inc.
- Headquarters: Denver, Colorado, U.S.
- Number of locations: 200+
- Area served: United States, Canada
- Parent: Red Lion Hotels Corporation
- Website: www.knightsinn.com

Knights Inn (officially Knights Franchise Systems, Inc.) is an American full-limited service hotel chain owned by Red Lion Hotels Corporation and based in Denver, Colorado. Knights Inn used to be built with all-exterior corridors and medieval-inspired architecture, but the chain now has updated options for all Knights Inn properties.

== History ==
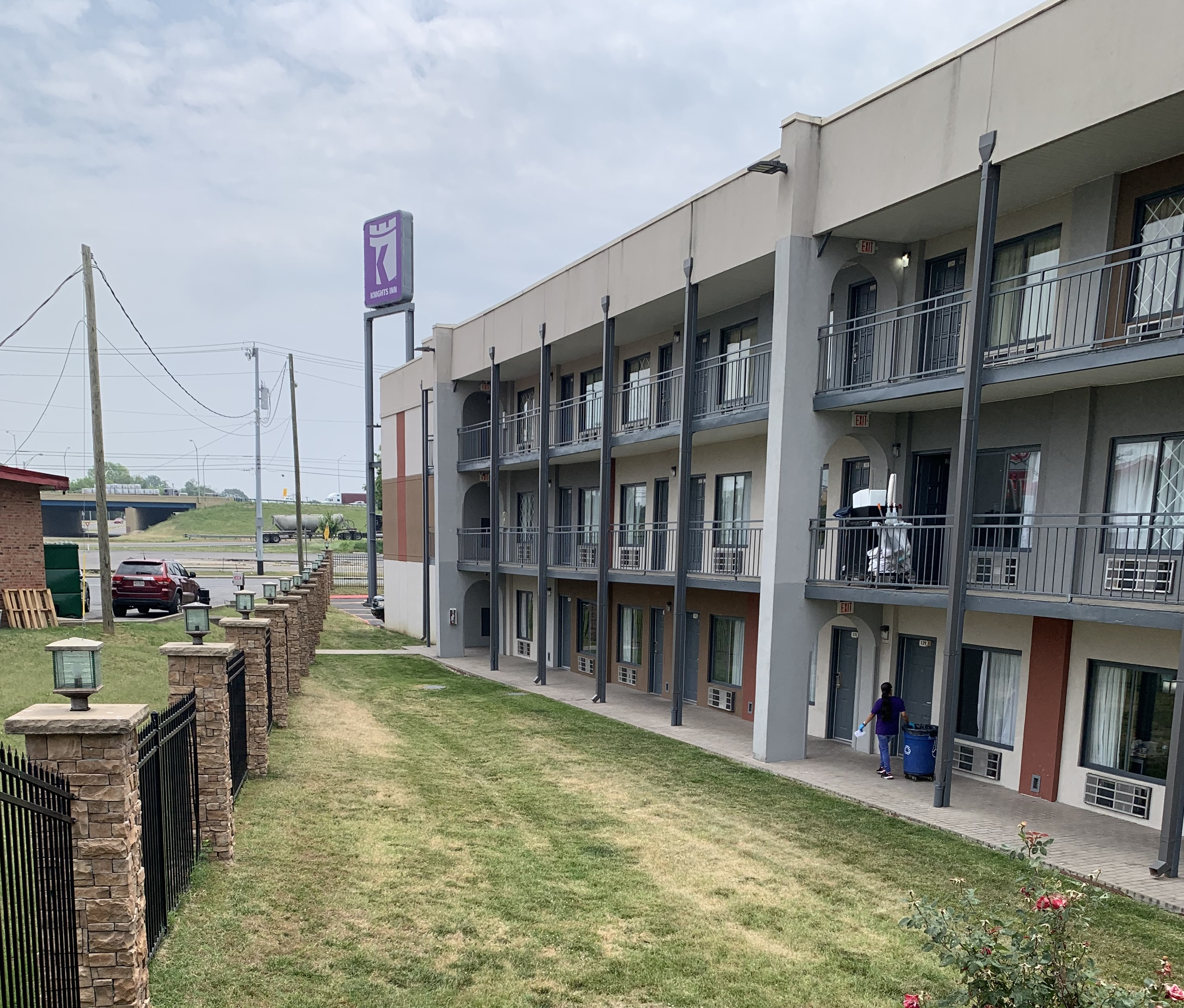
A Knights Inn in Nashville, Tennessee.

Knights Inn started in Columbus, Ohio when its first location opened in 1974. The Columbus-based Cardinal Industries, Inc., former manufacturer of prefabricated buildings such as apartments and motels, developed the chain. The chain utilized extensive landscaping and Tudor architecture, and all properties featured only one story. The buildings were also prefabricated, and were shipped on trucks to their sites.

Knights Inn introduced Arborgate Inn, a "no-frills" brand featuring fewer amenities and more modern architecture, along with a higher-end variant called Knights Stop. Knights Inn filed for Chapter 11 bankruptcy in 1989, one year after the introduction of Arborgate Inn.

Hospitality Management Systems (HMS) acquired the Knights Inn franchise and management contract rights from Cardinal Industries in 1991. At this point, many properties had begun re-branding to other companies, most notably Motel 6, Travelodge, and Days Inn; conversely, HMS began acquiring buildings from other chains and re-branding them to Knights Inn, thus abandoning the chain's architecture standards. HMS successfully sued the owners of properties re-branded from Knights Inn and forced them to alter the appearances of their buildings.

Cendant purchased Knights Inn in 1995. At this same time, the sister brands were discontinued. In 2004, Cendant merged the Villager Inn brand, which it had previously acquired, into the Knights Inn division.

Cendant spun off its hotel properties as Wyndham Worldwide in 2006. In November 2007, there were 225 properties open in the United States and Canada.

On April 4, 2018, Wyndham Worldwide announced it was selling Knights Inn to Red Lion Hotels Corporation, a transaction which closed on May 14, 2018. As part of the ownership transition, the brand was removed from the Wyndham Rewards loyalty program as of May 2, 2018 and is now part of Red Lion's Hello Rewards loyalty program.

== See also ==
- List of motels
