= Cardinal Industries =

Manufactured housing corporation

Cardinal Industries, Inc.
- Founded: 1954; 72 years ago
- Headquarters: Columbus, Ohio
- Key people: Austin Guirlinger (president and CEO); Larry Rosenthal (vice president of apartment products); David J. Baker (vice president)

Cardinal Industries, Inc. was a corporation headquartered in Columbus, Ohio, United States. Established in 1954, it produced manufactured housing, including thousands of apartments in the United States. These one-story apartments were assembled on-site from 12 by 24 foot (3.7 by 7.3 m) modules. It also began the Knights Inn motel chain.

== Apartments ==
Cardinal apartments can be found in a few different configurations, depending partly on the number of 12' x 24' modules used. One-module apartments are advertised as efficiency or studio apartments. Some have murphy beds. Two-modules have one bedroom, with some models containing a utility room with washer and dryer connections. Three-modules have two bedrooms. Some contain two equally sized bedrooms, while others have a master bedroom instead. Most have washer and dryer connections. In addition to the ground floor living area, many offer attic space over one of the modules.

Most of the apartments were built in the 1970s and 1980s. The corporation filed for bankruptcy in 1989, and reorganized as Cardinal Realty Services, Inc., a real estate ownership and management company. Cardinal Realty Services, Inc. was listed on the New York Stock Exchange [CRSI] before merging with Equity Residential. Ownership of many properties transferred to Equity Residential. Today many of the properties are managed by Elon Property Management.

== Example apartment communities ==
- Bridge Point, Jacksonville, Florida
- Cardinal Village, Sewell, New Jersey Cardinal Village
- Glenwood Village, Macon, Georgia
- Palatka Oaks Apartments, Palatka Florida 32177
- Riverwood Apartments, Palatka, Florida 32177
- Slate Run, Indianapolis, Indiana
- Longwood, Lexington, Kentucky
- Northrup Court, Coraopolis, Pennsylvania
- Annhurst, Belcamp, Maryland
- Wentworth, Roseville, Michigan
- Dartmouth Place, Kent, Ohio
- Millburn, Stow, Ohio
- Pinewood Apartments, Kent, Ohio (not owned by Empirian)
- Bellflower Apartments, Lebanon, Ohio (owned by Central Management)
- Woodlands Apartments, Columbus, Ohio www.woodlandsohiobyelon.com
- Retreat at Indian Lake, Hendersonville, Tennessee
- Pinewood Village Apartments, Chattanooga, Tennessee (Owned by Beverly, LLC)
- Lakeshore II Apartments, Fort Oglethorpe, Georgia
