= Red Lion Hotels Corporation =

American hotel company

- Formerly: Goodale & Barbieri Companies; (1950s–1997); Cavanaughs Hospitality Corporation; (1997–2000); WestCoast Hospitality Corporation; (2000–2005)
- Type: Subsidiary
- Industry: Hospitality
- Founded: 1937; 89 years ago (as a property management division of a bank, later becoming Goodale & Barbieri Companies); Spokane, Washington, U.S.
- Headquarters: Denver, Colorado, U.S.
- Area served: United States, Canada
- Key people: John Russell (CEO)
- Products: Hotels and resorts
- Revenue: ▼US$142.92 million (2015)
- Operating income: ▲US$13.88 million (2015)
- Net income: ▲US$2.7 million (2015)
- Total assets: ▲US$287.22 million (2015)
- Total equity: ▲US$167.60 million (2015)
- Number of employees: 1,783 (2015)
- Parent: Sonesta International Hotels
- Subsidiaries: Vantage Hospitality; GuestHouse International; Hotel RL; Red Lion Hotels
- Website: redlion.com

Red Lion Hotels Corporation, doing business as RLH Corporation, is an American hospitality corporation that primarily engages in the franchising, management and ownership of upscale, mid-scale and economy hotels. Red Lion, headquartered in Denver, Colorado, has 90,000 rooms across more than 1,400 properties (as of May 2018) in North America.

== History ==
=== Goodale & Barbieri era ===
==== 1930s–1970s: Origins as a local property management company ====
Red Lion Hotels Corporation's roots can be traced back to Spokane, Washington in 1937 when the property management division of Washington Trust Bank, then known as The Washington Trust Company, was established and led by a man named Frank M. Goodale. Goodale quickly hired Louis Barbieri, who was from nearby De Smet, Idaho and a recent business degree graduate from Gonzaga University, to work under him. In 1937, the company would be founded as the "West Coast Hospitality Corporation." Frank Goodale purchased the property management business from Washington Trust in 1944 and kept Barbieri on as an employee. By the mid-1950s, Barbieri was elevated to a partner in the business, and the company formally became known as Goodale & Barbieri Companies. Though Barbieri went on to buy out Goodale's share in the company in 1959, he maintained the company's name. The company focused primarily on commercial real estate and development, but expanded into housing in 1972.

==== 1970s–1990s: Diversification into lodging and entertainment operations ====
In 1976, Goodale & Barbieri launched its hospitality division, constructing and opening its first hotel near present-day Riverfront Park. The hotel, originally called the TraveLodge River Inn (unrelated to Travelodge), was constructed in a limited liability partnership with the Burlington Northern Railroad on a four-acre plot of land, then-utilized as a coal storage yard, that the railroad owned but no longer needed, in part because of the urban transformation and redevelopment of Spokane's riverfront for Expo '74.

Goodale & Barbieri eventually created a brand name for the company's hotel operations, launching the Cavanaughs brand in 1980. By 1987, the company established a computerized event ticketing company, G&B Select A Seat, which is now known as TicketsWest. In 1991, the company briefly ventured into food production, purchasing a local Spokane dairy, Broadview Dairy, out of bankruptcy and operating it until its closure in 1997.

=== Going public ===
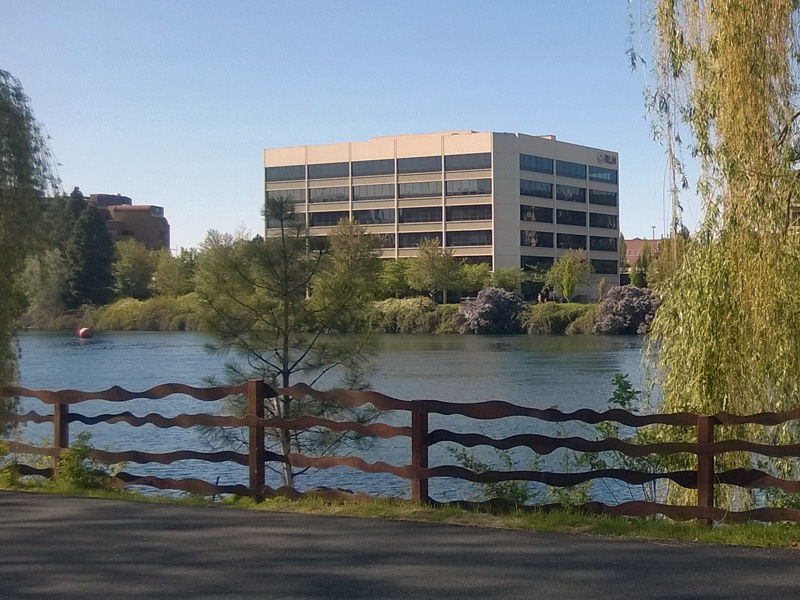
Red Lion Hotels Corporation's Spokane regional office, formerly its corporate headquarters

==== 1990s–2000s: IPO, mergers, and corporate rebrandings ====
===== Rebranding as Cavanaughs Hospitality Corporation =====
Preparing for an initial public offering, Goodale & Barbieri Companies adopted its hotel brand into its corporate identity in 1997, changing its name to Cavanaughs Hospitality Corporation. The IPO was completed in April 1998, and Cavanaughs began trading under the ticker CVH.

===== Merger and rebranding to WestCoast Hospitality Corporation =====
By the end of 1999, Cavanaughs announced it would acquire its regional rival, Seattle-based WestCoast Hotels, Inc. with transaction closing on January 7, 2000. On March 1, 2000, the combined company began trading under the new ticker, WEH. Recognizing the broader geographic reach of the WestCoast name, Cavanaughs also changed its name to WestCoast Hospitality Corporation with the launch of its new stock ticker and announced plans to rebrand its hotels into the WestCoast name.

In addition to the expanded hotel portfolio following the acquisition of WestCoast, the company also announced plans to franchise properties under its brand.

===== Red Lion Hotels acquisition =====
By 2001, the company grew again; this time by announcing it would acquire the Red Lion Hotels brand and properties (along with several other DoubleTree properties) from Hilton Hotels. The $51 million acquisition expanded the company's footprint to every Western state, except New Mexico, and grew its portfolio to nearly 90 hotels and 15,000 rooms. Capitalizing on the Red Lion brand, a majority of the company's WestCoast Hotels properties were rebranded to the Red Lion name within the two years following the acquisition.

=== Red Lion Hotels Corporation era ===
==== 2005–2016: Further rebranding, divestitures, and acquisitions ====
In September 2005, further realizing the revitalization of the Red Lion name, WestCoast Hospitality Corporation assumed its present-day name, Red Lion Hotels Corporation and changed its stock ticker to RLH. It also announced its ambitions to double in size from 50 markets to 100 markets by 2010 through company-owned, joint venture, and franchised hotel openings.

In April 2006, RLHC divested its real estate management business, G&B Real Estate Services, spinning it off into a separate company. The spun-off company was reestablished as Goodale & Barbieri Company, a nod to its historical past, and as of 2020, remains based in Spokane and led by members of the Barbieri family.

In mid-2008, Columbia Pacific Opportunity Fund, an investment manager for the Baty family, the Seattle founders of Emeritus Corporation, submitted an unsolicited acquisition offer of $9.50 per share to acquire Red Lion. At the time, Columbia Pacific held 12.7 percent of Red Lion. By October, Columbia Pacific had withdrawn its offer and, shortly thereafter, the Red Lion board of directors enacted a poison pill plan, drawing the ire of Columbia Pacific which stated its belief that Red Lion should be liquidated because company-owned assets were in "excess of Red Lion's market capitalization". Later that year, after the share price increased significantly, Red Lion removed its poison pill.

Growth of its hotel operations continued into the 2010 decade. In October 2014, RLHC announced a new upscale conversion brand, Hotel RL. In April 2015, RLHC acquired GuestHouse International, LLC and its two brands, GuestHouse International and Settle Inn & Suites, from Boomerang Hotels in a deal with up to $10 million. The acquisition more than doubled Red Lion's size from 57 properties to 130 properties and added 5,187 rooms to its portfolio.

==== 2016–present: Vantage acquisition, headquarters relocation, and refocus ====
In September 2016, RLHC acquired Vantage Hospitality Group and its brands Vantage Hotels, Americas Best Value Inn, Canadas Best Value Inn, Lexington by Vantage, America's Best Inns and Suites, Country Hearth Inns, Jameson Inns, Signature Inn, and 3 Palms Hotels & Resorts.

Following up on its acquisition of Vantage and its nine brands, RLHC pared down its brand lineup and positioning in May 2017 to eliminate market position overlaps and provide its franchisees the flexibility to move between brands. In addition to retiring the Vantage name, the announcement eliminated five of the nine Vantage brands – keeping only Signature Inn, Americas Best Value Inn, Canadas Best Value Inn, and Country Hearth Inn & Suites. All five of Red Lion's pre-acquisition brands were maintained. The eliminated Vantage brands competed directly with Red Lion's existing brands or had a very small footprint. With the brand realignment, RLHC also subdivided its economy segment into three tiers – upper economy, economy, and lower economy – and promoted its existing GuestHouse brand to the upper economy segment. The retired Vantage brands and properties were reorganized into an RLHC-owned entity called the Stays Inns Collection.

Former logo of Red Lion Hotels Corporation, used until around July 2017, when it rebranded itself as RLH Corporation.

The company quietly rebranded itself as RLH Corporation around July 2017, though still maintaining its legal name of Red Lion Hotels Corporation. The company also began using a new logo that could be best described as an evolution to the old logo.

As a result of its acquisition of Vantage Hospitality, which transformed the company's footprint from regional to national, Red Lion Hotels Corporation moved its corporate headquarters from Spokane to Denver, Colorado, in August 2017, to be more centrally located to its franchisees, partners, vendors, and two regional offices. The former headquarters office in Spokane will be maintained as a regional office along with the former headquarters of Vantage Hospitality in Coral Springs, Florida.

On August 17, 2017, RLHC announced it had sold its TicketsWest business to Paciolan, a ticketing business which is owned by Learfield. On April 4, 2018, RLHC announced it had reached an agreement with Wyndham Worldwide to acquire the Knights Inn brand for $27 million. The transaction closed on May 14, 2018. On December 30, 2020, it was announced RLHC would be acquired by Sonesta International Hotels Corporation. The acquisition was finalized on March 17, 2021.

== Hotels ==
Red Lion Hotels Corporation operates six hotel brands within the following market segments:

Brand	Market segment
Hotel RL	Upscale
Red Lion Hotels	Upper midscale
Red Lion Inn & Suites	Midscale select service
Americas Best Value Inn; Canadas Best Value Inn	Economy
Knights Inn	Lower economy

=== Franchising ===
The Franchise Segment licenses the Red Lion brand to third-party hotel owners. As of 2009, there were approximately 17 franchised Red Lion hotels. Hotel owners can franchise as either a full-service Red Lion Hotel, which offer restaurant and banquet meeting space; a limited-service Red Lion Inn & Suites; or under the Leo Hotel Collection, for unique, boutique, or historic hotels. The Las Vegas Hotel & Casino was the first hotel to join the Leo Collection in February 2013.

== Loyalty program ==
RLHC operates a loyalty program called Hello Rewards with support provided within a mobile app provided by Monscierge. Each qualifying stay will earn the guest 10 Hello Bucks, which can be used towards future stays with no blackouts.
