= Roger Sonnabend =

American hotelier and businessman

Roger P. Sonnabend (September 17, 1925 – December 7, 2008) was an American hotelier and businessman. He was the head of Sonesta International Hotels.

== Early life and education ==
Roger, the eldest of three brothers, graduated from MIT and took the helm at the Nautilus Hotel and Beach Club, in Atlantic Beach, New York, when he was 21. He graduated Harvard Business School in 1949.

== Career ==
The family business was known as Sonnabend Operated Hotels, which later merged with Childs Restaurant Group when A.M. Sonnabend purchased a controlling interest in Childs in 1955. Childs was renamed Hotel Corporation of America when the Sonnabend Operated Hotels were merged with Childs. Two prominent hotels included were the Plaza Hotel (New York) and the Mayflower Hotel (Washington DC). Roger was promoted to President upon the death of his father, the founder of the chain.

In 1969, the company engaged an advertising agency to create a new brand name. The agency felt the company already had a great name that was used by the Rib Room restaurants that operated at many of the hotels. The name was Sonesta. Sonesta is derived from "Sonny" and "Esther". AM Sonnabend was known to many as "Sonny". Among the many commercial interests of AM Sonnabend, was a Holstein dairy farm located in Massachusetts. The Sonnabends often enjoyed "baked potato Sonesta" when entertaining at the farm and the recipe was later used when serving baked potatoes at the Rib Room restaurants. Baked potatoes Sonesta were topped with butter, sour cream and chives. This popular American tradition was first introduced by the RIb Room restaurants.

Among the hotels managed by HCA was a 400-room luxury ocean-front hotel in Southampton Parish, Bermuda—originally named the Carlton Beach. It became entangled in extensive litigation between the builder/owner, the J. Irwin Miller family, and HCA. After a Court resolution that satisfied no one, the hotel was purchased by HCA and later renamed the Sonesta Beach. It was demolished after suffering severe damage in a hurricane around 2005.

Roger's political work landed him on the master list of Nixon political opponents.
