= Baymont by Wyndham =

American hotel chain

- Type: Subsidiary
- Founded: 1973; 53 years ago
- Headquarters: Parsippany, New Jersey
- Number of locations: 546 (December 31, 2023)
- Products: Hotels
- Parent: Wyndham Hotels & Resorts
- Website: www.baymontinns.com

Baymont by Wyndham, formerly branded as Baymont Inn & Suites, is a hotel franchise owned by Wyndham Hotels & Resorts and based in the United States. As of December 31, 2023, it has 546 properties with 41,357 rooms.

== History ==
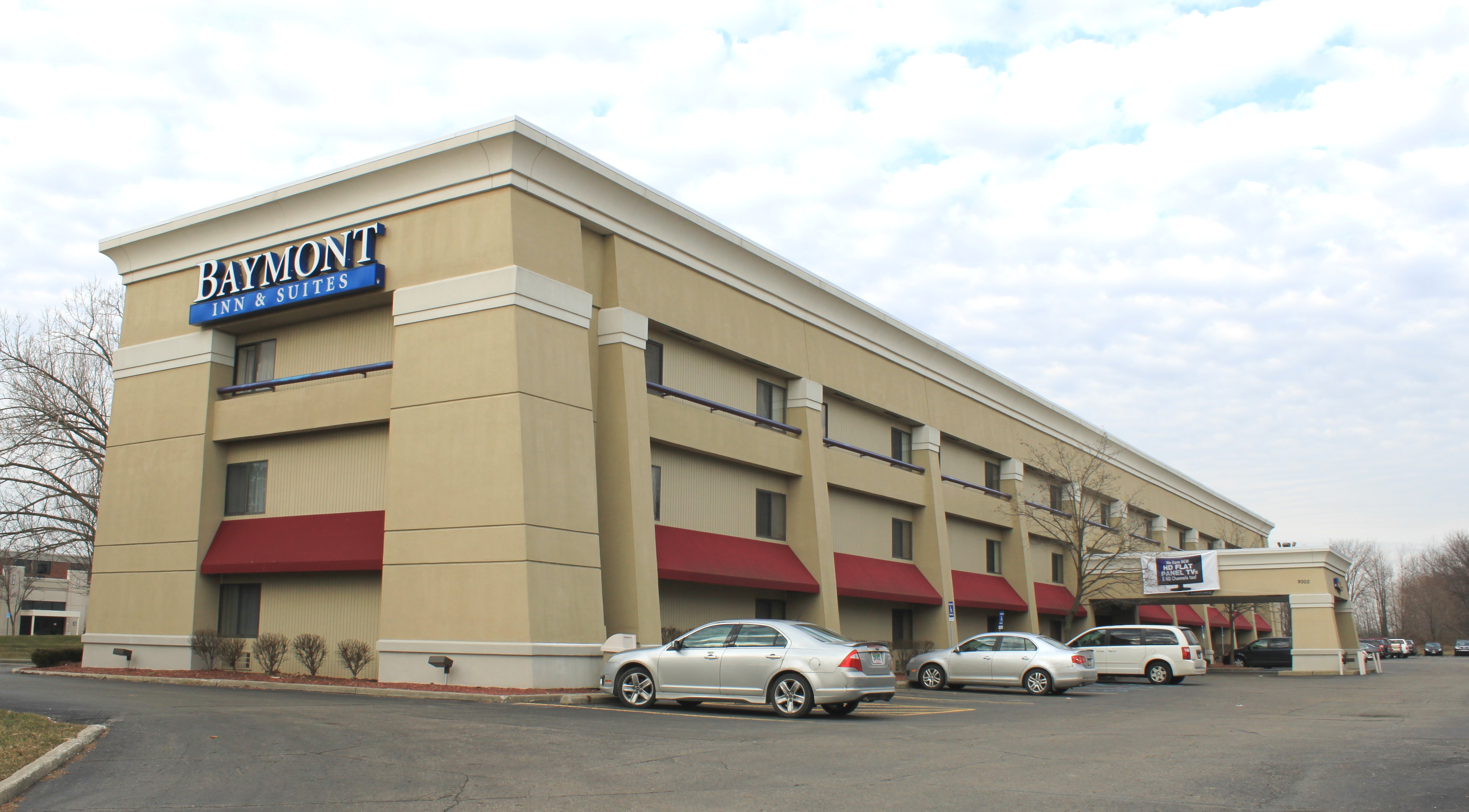
Baymont Inn in Romulus, Michigan

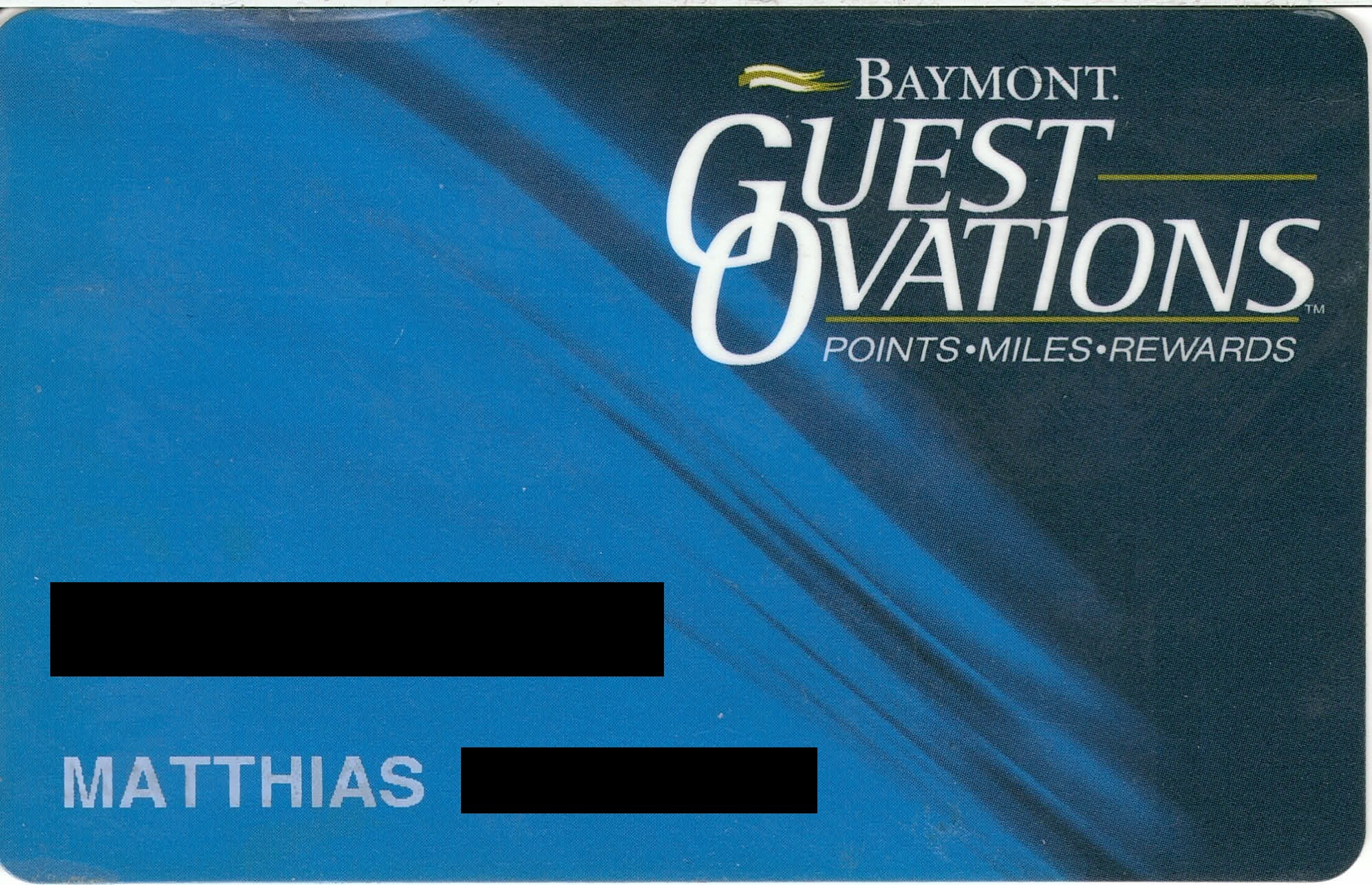
Baymont Inn & Suites customer card

=== Foundation ===
The chain began as an idea by the former CEO of Marcus Corporation, Steven Marcus to create a limited-service, discount-priced motel chain. The first property, located in Oshkosh, Wisconsin, opened in 1973 and was named Budgetel (the property later became a La Quinta Inn). A prototype hotel was designed in 1984 in the form of a long, linear three or four story boxlike building covered by precast concrete slabs. This design gave the Budgetel hotels a distinctive appearance. Today, however, Baymont properties can have a variety of appearances, and some have been converted from other brands. Each hotel features oversized rooms and interior corridors.

=== Development since 2000 ===
The name was changed to Baymont Inn in early 1999. In July 2004, Marcus Corporation sold the Baymont chain to the La Quinta Corporation, the Dallas parent of La Quinta Inns and La Quinta Inns & Suites. In November 2005, La Quinta was sold to affiliates of the Blackstone Group for approximately $3.4B. Following that acquisition, Blackstone converted certain Baymont Inns to La Quinta and in March 2006, Blackstone sold the Baymont brand name to what was then the Cendant Hotel Group (since renamed Wyndham Hotels & Resorts). America's Best Franchising revived the Budgetel name in 2008 for a new chain.

In January 2016, there were over 400 Baymont Inns and Suites open in the United States. Former Baymont Inns retained by Blackstone Group has since transitioned to that company's La Quinta Inn brand. Most locations are in the South and the Midwest, with a handful of locations in California. Entrepreneur listed Baymont as one of the fastest-growing franchises in 2016.
