= Red Lion Hotels =

Hotel chain

- Type: Subsidiary
- Industry: Hotel
- Founded: 1959; 67 years ago
- Number of locations: 39
- Area served: United States
- Parent: Red Lion Hotels Corporation
- Website: www.redlion.com/red-lion-hotels

Red Lion Hotels is a full-service, midscale hotel brand owned by Red Lion Hotels Corporation.

Red Lion competes in the moderate-priced, full-service segment of the lodging industry, along with Holiday Inn, Ramada. Its complementary brand, Red Lion Inn & Suites competes in the moderate-priced limited-service segment of the lodging industry, along with Holiday Inn Express, Comfort Inn, and La Quinta Inns & Suites. They have 53 hotels in their system with 12,344 total rooms, and 712,687 square feet of meeting space.

== History ==
=== Early years ===
Red Lion Hotels' roots began in 1959 in the Portland metropolitan area by two local business partners, Tod McClaskey and Ed Pietz. The two had met at McClaskey's first business, the Frontier Room, in Vancouver, Washington and went on to purchase the 89-room Thunderbird Motor Inn in Portland, Oregon, located along the Willamette River, at the east end of Portland's Broadway Bridge, across the street from the Memorial Coliseum. It was the first property in what was initially called Thunderbird-Red Lion Inns.

McClaskey's business background and Pietz's construction background allowed the hotel company to grow rather quickly and the two continued constructing and acquiring motels in the Western United States under the Thunderbird name, until they ran into a situation in Medford, Oregon where a Thunderbird already existed, at which point they launched the Red Lion brand. At that point, they branded their motels under the Thunderbird name, and their full-service hotels under the Red Lion name. By the time the pair sold the company in 1984, the chain had grown to over 50 properties.

A 1960s-era postcard depicting the very first Thunderbird Motor Inn. The property was the first motel in the company that would become the Red Lion brand. Portland's Broadway Bridge can be seen in the background.

The original Thunderbird Motor Inn motel remained operating under the Thunderbird/Red Lion brand throughout its entire history, ultimately growing to 212 rooms, despite the Red Lion company and brand being sold numerous times through the 1980s and 1990s. The original motel would eventually land in the hands of Microsoft co-founder Paul Allen's Aegean Development Company, which purchased it on November 1, 1992 for $5 million. Allen had purchased the Portland Trail Blazers of the NBA several years prior and was planning a new arena next to the existing Memorial Coliseum. The new arena, known today as the Moda Center, opened in 1995 and would become part of the larger Rose Quarter sports and entertainment district. The motor inn's proximity to the new district greatly increased its redevelopment potential. Allen's company continued to own and operate the motel, then known as the Red Lion Inn Coliseum, until it was permanently closed on October 31, 2001. Aegean, cited the extraordinary maintenance costs of operating a 40-year hotel, weighed against potential revenues that would be generated by a redevelopment of the site, as its reason for closing the inn. The motel was demolished in 2002, clearing land for redevelopment, however, at the time of its demolition, it was unknown what the site would become, and as of December 2020, the site is still owned by Aegean and remains vacant.

=== 1980s–late 1990s: Growth, multiple sales, and decline ===
In 1984, Ed Pietz was ready to sell, so McClaskey and Pietz sold the chain—which had grown to 52 properties—to Kohlberg, Kravis, Roberts & Co. for a reported $600 million. At the time of the sale, the company had a footprint stretching across eight states and employed 11,000 workers, becoming the largest privately owned hotel chain west of the Mississippi River. McClaskey stayed on with Red Lion as its CEO until his retirement in 1989, while Pietz would go on to operate Raffle Hotels and Inns for a brief time, before transitioning into real estate development.

In July 1995, Kohlberg, Kravis, Roberts & Co. took Red Lion Hotels, Inc. public, with the stock ticker RL, at an initial stock price of $19 per share.

On September 13, 1996, Red Lion Hotels, Inc., still based in the Portland area in Vancouver, entered into an agreement to be acquired by then-Phoenix based Doubletree Corp. in a cash and stock deal worth $1.2 billion. At the time of the merger's closing on November 8, 1996, Red Lion had 56 properties, about half of which were company-owned. Doubletree acquired Red Lion to strengthen its footprint in the upscale hotel market and compete with other upscale brands like Marriott, Hilton, Sheraton, and Hyatt Therefore, it rebranded most of Red Lion's properties, a majority of which were upscale, full-service hotels as Doubletree Hotels, a process that was decided through individual vetting of each property. Mid-scale operations remained under the Red Lion banner. By the time Doubletree would go on to merge with Promus Hotel Corporation in December 1997, only 19 hotels remained under the Red Lion name.

=== Late 1990s–early 2000s: Brand revival ===
Promus Hotel Corporation recognized the equity of the Red Lion brand in the Pacific Northwest (in a consumer study, Red Lion had the highest brand recognition in the region). In May 1999, Promus moved forward on a plan to relaunch the fledging Red Lion brand in the mid-scale market and grow it to over 100 properties by 2004. The revival plan included transitioning nine properties from the Doubletree brand back to the Red Lion brand, and opening up the brand name to franchising.

However, Promus never had the opportunity to complete the revival. In the fall of 1999, Hilton announced it would acquire Promus, along with its brands that included Red Lion. While Hilton initially intended to continue with Promus' plan to reestablish the Red Lion brand in the west, the brand, now positioned in the mid-scale hotel market, ultimately became a misfit with Hilton's customer base and portfolio, which already had other mid-scale brands such as Hilton Garden Inn, and the Hampton Inn brand it had also acquired from Promus. As a result, in 2001, Hilton announced it would sell the Red Lion brand to Spokane, Washington-based WestCoast Hospitality. By the time of the sale, the chain had rebounded to 42 hotels, 22 of which were franchises.

Seeking to revitalize some of its aging properties, in 2004 WestCoast Hospitality announced plans to sell 11 company-owned hotels to fund a $40 million "rejuvenation project" for the rest of the chain. The following year WestCoast Hospitality changed its name to Red Lion Hotels Corporation, part of its effort to emphasize a renewed focus on the Red Lion brand.

== Operations ==
Red Lion hotels are currently located in Arizona, California, Colorado, Connecticut, Florida, Idaho, Maryland, Michigan, Mississippi, Missouri, Montana, Nevada, New Mexico, Ohio, Oregon, Pennsylvania, Utah, Washington, Wisconsin, as well as British Columbia in Canada. This includes approximately 30 company-owned and 17 franchised properties. The majority of these are full-service properties, though there are a growing number of limited-service locations.

In 2006 Red Lion Hotels announced plans to double the number of properties under the Red Lion brand within five years through acquisitions in Texas, California and Nevada and a gradual eastward expansion. However, by 2009 the chain had only managed to increase its holdings by two hotels. Between 2007 and 2008 parent company Red Lion Hotels Corporation lost one-third of its market value and subsequently instituted a wage freeze and five percent pay reduction for salaried employees. In a 2008 interview, CEO Anupam Narayan stated he expected the chain to lose six properties by the end of that year; franchises that did not commit to a required remodel program.

In early 2014 Red Lion Hotels Corp shifted the company focus away from the financial struggles of the market to the operation of the hotels under the Red Lion banner. This was due to a stabilization in the hospitality market following the economic downturn of 2007. The new CEO of the company coming from over 25 years in the hospitality industry wanted to focus more on providing a high quality brand for guests of the corporation.

== Marketing and promotions ==
In 2004 Red Lion launched a major advertising campaign under the tag line "Stay Comfortable". Featuring a cartoon lion caricature, the campaign included full-page ads in daily newspapers in nine U.S. cities, as well as regional editions of USA Today. Created by ISM Boston, the campaign was recognized with an Adrian Award by the Hospitality Sales and Marketing Association International (HSMAI).

In February 2008 Red Lion announced it had revamped and renamed "GuestAwards", its customer loyalty program. The newly debuted "Red Lion R&R Club" featured lower point redemption thresholds. In May 2014, the company announced it was changing its rewards program, and no longer issuing points. They began announcing in August 2013 their rewards program, called "Hello Rewards". The announcement offered little in details, but claimed to be the "most innovative rewards program yet" that will provide "a personalized experience with every reservation and hotel stay".
