= William W. Becker =

American entrepreneur (1921–2007)

William Walter Becker (May 18, 1921 – April 2, 2007) was an American hotelier. He is best known for creating the Motel 6 concept of inexpensive motel rooms.

Born in Pasadena, California, he was working as a house painter in Santa Barbara, California when he took a trip in 1960. The price and quality of the motel rooms were substandard, and he contacted a building contractor friend named Paul Greene about building low-cost hotels. The first Motel 6 opened in Santa Barbara in 1962 and offered rooms for $6. They sold the chain of 180 motels in 1968 for $14 million.

He then bought a cattle ranch in 1970 and in 1980 started the Stockmen's Bank, which was purchased in 2007 by National Bank of Arizona.

Becker died of a heart attack at his ranch outside Kingman, Arizona.
