= Sonesta International Hotels =

American hotel company

Sonesta International Hotels Corporation
- Formerly: Sonnabend Operated Hotels; Hotel Corporation of America
- Type: Private
- Industry: Hospitality
- Founded: 1937; 89 years ago
- Founder: A.M. "Sonny" Sonnabend
- Headquarters: Newton, Massachusetts
- Key people: John Murray (CEO)
- Brands: Royal Sonesta; Sonesta Hotels & Resorts; Sonesta Select; Sonesta ES Suites; Sonesta Simply Suites; Sonesta Posadas del Inca; Sonesta Cruise Collection
- Owner: Service Properties Trust
- Subsidiaries: RLH Corporation
- Website: sonesta.com

Sonesta International Hotels Corporation is an American hotel company based in Newton, Massachusetts. Founded in 1937, the company operates in eight countries and has over 1,200 properties as of 2023.

== History ==
In 1937, real estate mogul A.M. "Sonny" Sonnabend pooled his resources with six other investors to purchase the Preston Beach Hotel in Swampscott, Massachusetts. Sonnabend personally managed the hotel and began focusing on the hospitality industry. Over the following years, Sonnabend invested in other hotel properties, which he managed through Sonnabend Operated Hotels in 1944.

He purchased a series of properties in Florida, including the Palm Beach Biltmore and the Palm Beach Country Club, from oil magnate Henry Latham Doherty in 1944. Around the same time, he also purchased a series of hotels in Cleveland, Ohio, from Robert R. Young, including the Terminal Tower and Hotel Cleveland. Sonnabend Operated Hotels expanded west in 1948, when Sonnabend purchased the Edgewater Beach Hotel in Chicago. In 1953, he purchased the Plaza Hotel in Manhattan from hotelier Conrad Hilton for a reported $15 million.

In 1956, Sonnabend merged Sonnabend Operated Hotels with Childs Company, forming the Hotel Corporation of America. The company purchased the Mayflower Hotel in Washington, D.C., that year. The first Charterhouse Hotel was opened in Bangor, Maine, in 1957. Twenty-five other Charterhouse Hotels were built between 1957 and 1983. Beginning in the late 1950s, the name "Sonesta" became affiliated with hotels in the US and abroad. In 1968, the corporation began to grow internationally with the construction of the Sonesta Montreal. In 1969, the first Royal Sonesta Hotel was built in New Orleans.

In 1970, the Hotel Corporation of America was rebranded Sonesta International Hotels. The name "Sonesta" was a portmanteau of A.M. Sonnabend's nickname "Sonny" and his wife Esther's name. The company introduced "Just Us Kids", a children's club program, in 1975. The Sonesta Art Collection, formed in 1976, was one of the first corporate hotel programs to showcase original art. As of 2012, the collection included over 7,000 works of original art.

Throughout the 1980s and 1990s, Sonesta built several hotel properties in Egypt, and began operating Nile cruises. In the 1990s and 2000s, the company opened several new hotels in South America and the Caribbean.

=== Expansion and acquisition of Red Lion Hotels Corporation ===
Sonesta was sold in 2011 to an affiliate of Newton-based Hospitality Properties Trust (subsequently named Service Properties Trust), and it became a privately owned company again. 34% of Sonesta International Hotels Corporation is owned by Service Properties Trust (SVC), a real estate investment trust. In 2015, the company created Sonesta ES Suites, in cities like Columbus, Ohio, Cincinnati, and Cleveland.

In 2020, Sonesta became one of the fastest-growing hospitality companies in the United States. It had 80 hotels in early 2020. From September 2020 to March 2021, Service Properties Trust transferred over 200 hotels from Marriott Hotels & Resorts and IHG Hotels & Resorts to Sonesta brands, after the previous managers were negatively impacted by the COVID-19 pandemic. In September 2021, Sonesta began hotel franchising in the United States under Sonesta Franchising.

As of 2023, the company operates in eight countries and has over 1,200 properties. It is the 8th-largest hotel company in the United States as of 2024.

Sonesta's largest hotels are in Los Angeles, Houston, Chicago and New Orleans.

== Sonesta brands ==
As of April 2025, Sonesta operates under the following brands:

- Americas Best Value Inn by Sonesta
- Canadas Best Value Inn by Sonesta
- Classico
- MOD, a Sonesta Collection
- Red Lion Inn, Hotels and Suites
- Signature Inn by Sonesta
- Sonesta Essential
- Sonesta ES Suites
- Sonesta Hotels, Resorts & Cruises
- Sonesta Select
- Sonesta Simply Suites
- The James Hotels
- The Royal Sonesta

== See also ==
- Red Lion Hotels Corporation
- Roger Sonnabend
- The Benjamin Royal Sonesta New York
- The Chase Park Plaza Hotel
- The Clift Royal Sonesta Hotel
- The Royal Sonesta Washington DC Dupont Circle
