= La Quinta Inns & Suites =

North and Central American hotel chain

La Quinta Franchising LLC
- Type: Subsidiary
- Industry: Hotels
- Founded: 1968; 58 years ago San Antonio, Texas, U.S.
- Headquarters: 909 Hidden Ridge; Irving, Texas, U.S. 75038
- Number of locations: 918 (December 31, 2023)
- Area served: North America
- Key people: Krishna Paliwal, Brand President
- Number of employees: 9000
- Parent: Wyndham Hotels & Resorts
- Website: www.lq.com

La Quinta by Wyndham, also known as La Quinta Inn & Suites (Spanish: La Quinta, "the country villa", pronounced [la ˈkinta]), is a chain of limited-service hotels in the United States, Canada, Mexico, and Honduras owned by Wyndham Hotels & Resorts. La Quinta Holdings, Inc. first sold shares to the public in April 2014. La Quinta is headquartered in Irving, Texas. As of December 31, 2023, the chain owned and operated 918 properties with 89,391 rooms.

== History ==
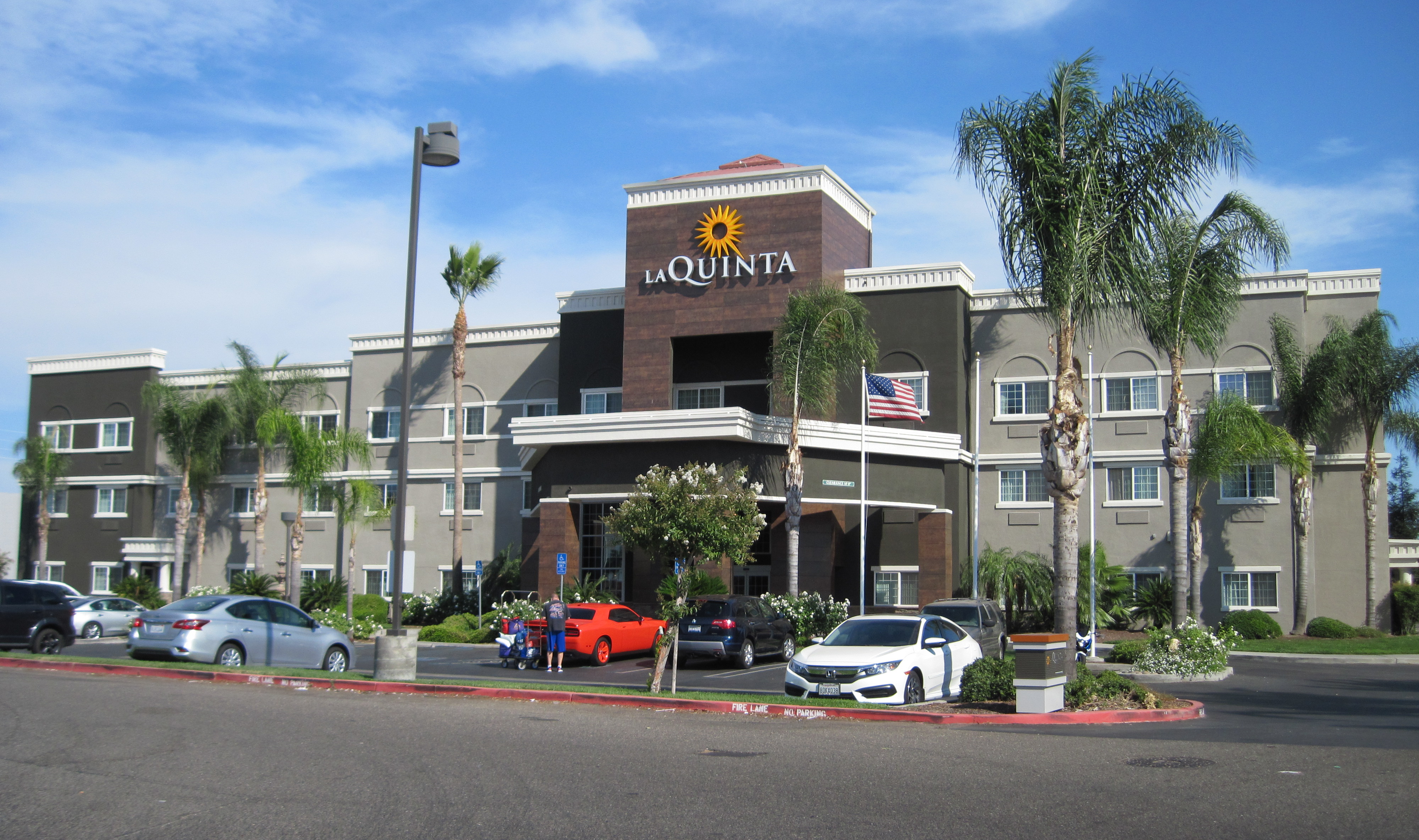
La Quinta in Salida, California

=== 1968 launch ===
The first La Quinta Inn location was opened in 1968 by real estate entrepreneur Sam Barshop (1929–2013) and his brother Phil (1935–1998) in San Antonio, Texas, across the street from the site of the HemisFair '68 World's Fair.

La Quinta's first headquarters were in San Antonio. In 1999, the company announced its relocation, transferring over 100 jobs to its new site. The company cited a lack of nonstop flights from San Antonio International Airport as a reason for the move, wishing to be closer to Dallas/Fort Worth International Airport. La Quinta retained around 300 employees in San Antonio to handle accounting, information systems, and reservations.

=== 2005 Blackstone acquisition ===
LQ Corporation, the parent company of the subsidiary LQ Properties, Inc., announced on November 9, 2005, that it had agreed to be acquired by the private equity firm Blackstone Group for $3.4 billion in cash and debt. The merger closed on January 25, 2006. At that point, La Quinta ranked as the 13th-largest hotel group worldwide, owning 360 hotels and franchising 250 under the names La Quinta Inn, La Quinta Inn & Suites, Baymont Inn & Suites, Woodfield Suites, and Budgetel (totaling about 65,000 rooms). A few months prior, Blackstone had purchased Wyndham Hotels, the group that would later acquire La Quinta in 2018.

In 2011, La Quinta phased out pay-per-view in-room entertainment to focus on allowing customers to use their own devices. In 2012, La Quinta launched an "Instant Hold" option, which allowed customers to make last-minute reservations using just their phone numbers.

In 2013, Blackstone began to prepare for the sale of La Quinta. Leading up to the 2014 public stock offering, all La Quinta properties were owned or franchised by the company's subsidiary, La Quinta Properties, Inc., a real estate investment trust (REIT) that leased the properties back to the parent company. In 2015, La Quinta launched its "Del Sol" prototype, featuring LED lighting, indoor and outdoor pools, and modernized decor. In September 2015, President and CEO Wayne Goldberg stepped down, with CFO Keith Cline stepping in as interim CEO.

=== 2018 Wyndham acquisition ===
On January 18, 2018, Wyndham Worldwide Corporation and La Quinta Holdings Inc. announced they had entered into a definitive agreement under which Wyndham Worldwide would acquire La Quinta's hotel franchise and hotel management businesses for $1.95 billion in cash. The loyalty programs of La Quinta and Wyndham were planned to be merged. The deal also stipulated that La Quinta's real estate assets be spun off into a separate, publicly traded real estate investment trust called CorePoint Lodging. Buying La Quinta enabled Wyndham to become the third-largest hotel room operator in the world, surpassing InterContinental. The acquisition was completed on May 31, 2018, adding more than 900 franchised hotel properties to the Wyndham portfolio.

In June 2019, La Quinta signed a deal with Caribbean developer Profusion Group to develop the brand in the Dominican Republic, targeting eight locations within five years.

== Description ==
In some Spanish-speaking countries, la quinta means "the country place" or "mansion". While room types and layouts vary by hotel, company-owned properties maintain standardized room settings, whereas franchised locations offer more variety. Room rates fluctuate daily. The chain targets middle-income, price-conscious travelers. Most properties have a pool.

The operating entity, LQ Management LLC, is headquartered in the Las Colinas area of Irving, Texas, near Dallas.
