= Vantage Hospitality =

American hotel corporation

Vantage Hospitality Group Inc.
- Type: Subsidiary
- Founded: 1999
- Defunct: September 30, 2016; 9 years ago
- Fate: Acquired by Red Lion Hotels Corporation
- Headquarters: Coral Springs, Florida, United States
- Number of locations: 1000+ (United States and Canada)
- Parent: Red Lion Hotels Corporation (2016–present)

Vantage Hospitality Group Inc. was an American hotel corporation, operating hotels in the United States and internationally. Its brands include Best Value Inn and Lexington by Vantage. In 2016, Vantage Hospitality Group was acquired by Red Lion Hotels Corporation.

== History ==
Vantage Hospitality Group was founded in 1999 and had over 1,000 properties around the U.S. and Canada by 2016. By 2016, Vantage Hospitality operated 10 brands, including Best Value Inn and Value Inn Worldwide. America's Best Value Inn received a Hotel Vikas diamond award in 2010 in the Best Hotel Franchisor category. Hotel Vikas is a trade publication targeted to hotel CEOs. In 2005, Vantage introduced the Lexington by Vantage brand.

In 2014, Vantage acquired America's Best Franchising and its brands: America's Best Inns & Suites, Country Hearth Inns & Suites, Jameson Inn, Signature Inn, and 3 Palms Hotels and Resorts. As of August 2015 Vantage planned to re-launch the then inactive Signature Inn brand as a budget chain, with newly constructed properties.

On September 14, 2016 the Red Lion Hotels Corporation announced it was acquiring Vantage for $23 million.

On December 30, 2020, it was announced RLHC would be acquired by Sonesta International Hotels Corporation. The acquisition was finalized on March 17, 2021. The America's Best Value Inn and Canada's Best Value Inn names remain in use as Sonesta's economy brands.

== Brands ==
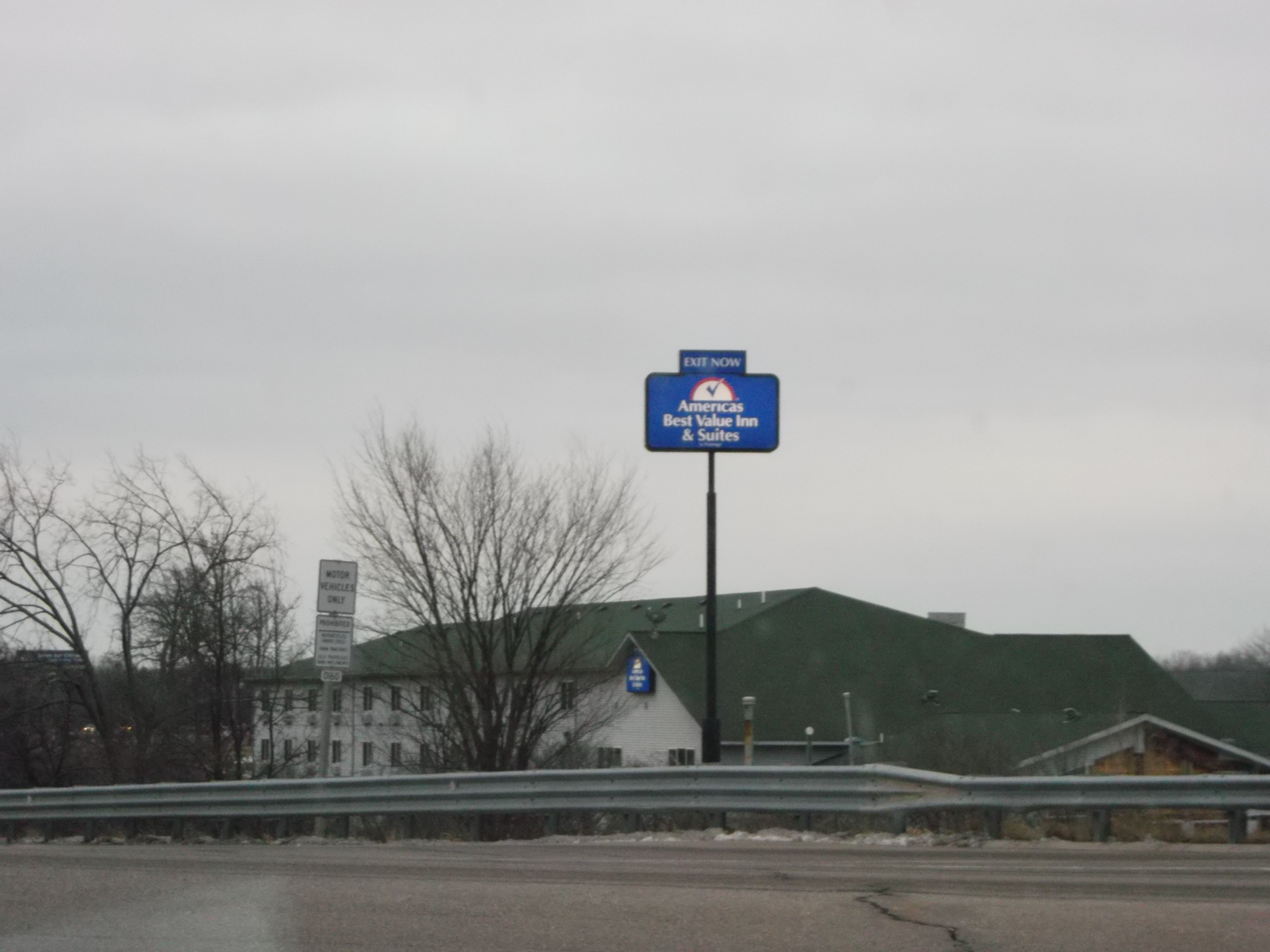
America's Best Value Inn in Flint, Michigan

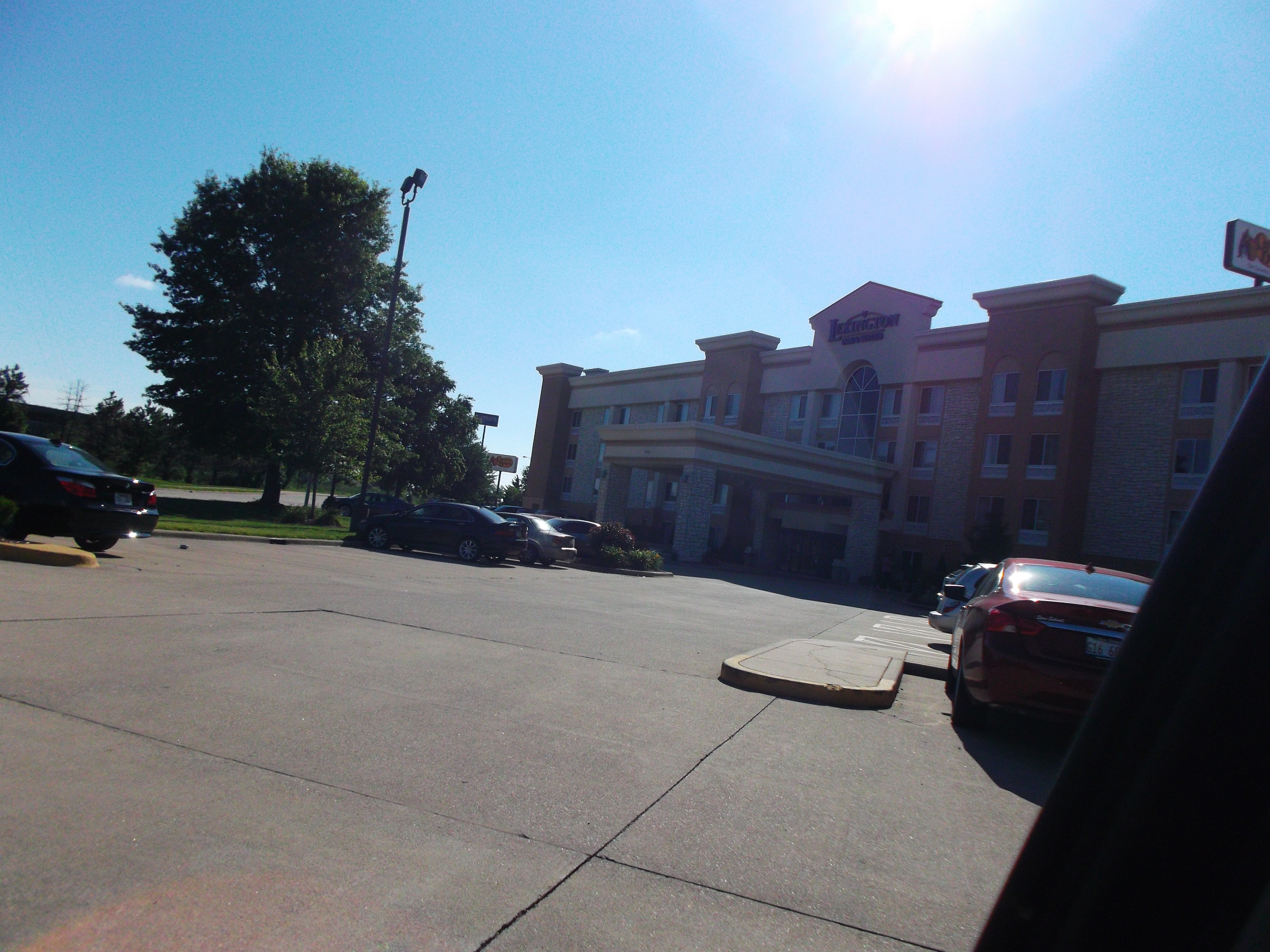
Lexington by Vantage in Effingham, Illinois

- America's Best Inns: A chain of economy hotels. Vantage plans to eliminate this brand, with most properties transitioning into America's Best Value Inns.
- America's Best Value Inns: Mid-economy hotels with over 1,000 locations nationwide.
- Canada's Best Value Inns A chain of economy properties located across Canada.
- Country Hearth Inns & Suites: An upper-economy and lower midscale brand. Country Hearth Inns feature rooms, suites, and a complimentary breakfast.
- Jameson Inn: A midscale chain operating primarily in the Southern United States.
- Lexington Hotels & Inns: A collection of mid-scale and upscale inns, suites, and resorts. Typical Lexington properties feature on-site dining, business centers, and fitness centers. Many Lexington properties are brand conversions, but the chain has begun building new properties.
- Value Inns Worldwide A chain of economy properties located across the world
- 3 Palms Hotels & Resorts: A small chain of hotels and resorts.

== Loyalty programs ==
Vantage offered two loyalty programs for its guests. Guests at America's Best Value Inn and Canada's Best Value Inn properties are eligible to sign up for a Value Club Card, which entitles them to 15% off of Best Value Inn stays, plus additional discounts from partners. Vantage's Lexington properties participate in the Voilà Hotel Rewards program. Participants receive points and other benefits.

America's Best Value Inn and Canada's Best Value Inn are now linked to the Sonesta loyalty program.

== America's Best Franchising ==
(Not to be confused with America's Best Value Inn)

America's Best Franchising
- Owner: Vantage Hospitality

America's Best Franchising, based in Atlanta, Georgia, was an American lodging company. Its brands comprised America's Best Inn, Country Hearth Inns & Suites, Jameson Inn, 3 Palms Hotel, Parkside Hotels, and Budgetel. Of the brands, America's Best Inn was founded in Marion, Illinois, The Budgetel name is a revival of a brand which was renamed Baymont Inn & Suites. Country Hearth opened its first location in 1983 as Homeplace Inn in Angleton, Texas.

Budgetel Franchise System is an American-based hotel franchiser to United States and Canada. The current Budgetel was established in Atlanta, Georgia in 2007 by brothers Mike and R. C. Patel who bought the brand from Blackstone Group. In 2009, America's Best Franchising, Inc. began franchising the brand.

In 2014, America's Best Franchising was acquired by Vantage Hospitality. All ABF brands are now part of Vantage with the exception of Budgetel, which is part of Hospitality Lodging Systems.
