= Henry Silverman =

American entrepreneur and investor (born 1940)

- Born: Henry R. Silverman; August 1, 1940 (age 86); New York City, U.S.
- Education: Williams College (BA, 1961); University of Pennsylvania Law School (JD, 1964)
- Occupations: Businessman; investor
- Years active: 1965-present
- Employer(s): Apollo Global Management; Cendant Corporation (prior)
- Known for: Founder of Hospitality Franchise Systems (later Cendant Corporation); Co-Founder of Univision
- Spouse(s): Susan Anne Herson (divorced); Nancy Ann Kraner (divorced); Karen Hader
- Children: 4

Henry R. Silverman (born August 1, 1940) is an American entrepreneur and private equity investor. Silverman is best known for his role in building Cendant Corporation into a multibillion-dollar business services company that provided car rentals, travel reservation services as well as real estate brokerage services; it was also the largest franchisor of hotels globally.

Among the brands that Silverman controlled included hotels and motels such as AmeriHost Inn, Days Inn, Howard Johnson's, Ramada, Super 8 and Travelodge; car rental operators such as Avis Rent a Car System and Budget Rent a Car; real estate brokerages such as Coldwell Banker, Century 21 Real Estate and Sotheby's International Realty; as well as Orbitz Worldwide.

== Early life and education ==
Born to a Jewish family in Brooklyn, New York on August 1, 1940, the son of the chief executive of commercial finance firm James Talcott Inc., Silverman graduated with a B.A. from Williams College in 1961 and then a J.D. from University of Pennsylvania Law School in 1964. He served in the United States Navy Reserves and then practiced tax law.

== Career ==
=== Early career (1965-1990) ===
Silverman began his career in business as an assistant to Steve Ross, who was then assembling the future Warner Communications. Silverman had graduated from Williams College with a BA in Art History in 1961 and spent the following three years earning a JD from the University of Pennsylvania, where he graduated in 1964. Silverman left the job with Ross, which had been secured by Silverman's father, a well known businessman himself, to join White, Weld & Company an investment banking firm.

After a short stint in investment banking, Silverman pursued a number of entrepreneurial ventures in the late 1960s and through the 1970s. In 1984, Silverman joined Reliance Group Holdings, which was run by corporate raider Saul Steinberg. Silverman then was president and CEO of Telemundo, the Spanish-language television network from 1986 through 1990. While at Reliance, Silverman acquired Days Inn, the US hotel chain in a $590 million deal. Silverman is estimated to have made a $125 million profit on the sale of Days Inn.

In 1990, Silverman accepted a position as partner at Blackstone Group, a private equity firm. However his tenure at Blackstone was cut short because of litigation between Prudential Insurance, one of Blackstone's largest investors, over a Steinberg deal in which Silverman had been involved. In 1991, he left to head Hospitality Franchise Systems, an investment of Blackstone's that Silverman had overseen. He would later build HFS into Cendant Corporation.

=== Creating Cendant Corporation (1991-2006) ===
Building on his experience with Days Inn, while at Blackstone Silverman created Hospitality Franchise Systems (HFS) which would acquire a number of hotel franchises. Among Silverman's purchases were such brands as Ramada and Howard Johnson's as well as Days Inn, which he was able to buy for $290 million (almost half what he had sold it for) after the company had filed for bankruptcy in 1991. Hospitality Franchise Systems went public in a 1992 IPO.

HFS was among the fastest growing companies of its size in the 1990s and the company's stock had risen from its IPO price of $4 per share to $77 per share by 1998. However, in 1998, Silverman led Cendant into what would prove a disastrous merger with CUC, a direct marketing company that operated Shoppers Advantage and Travelers Advantage (now part of Affinion Group. The $14 billion merger of HFS and CUC resulted in Cendant Corporation, which was formed in December 1997. Also, as part of the merger, Silverman announced he would reduce his day-to-day involvement with the company and assume the company's chairmanship in preference of CUC's founder and CEO Walter Forbes.

Just months after the merger, in April 1998 Cendant uncovered massive accounting improprieties at CUC and resulted in one of the largest financial scandals of the 1990s. After the accounting scandal was uncovered, Silverman and the Cendant board forced Forbes’ resignation and Silverman assumed the CEO post. Under Silverman, Cendant bounced back from the accounting scandal far outperforming the markets in the early 2000s.

Silverman's compensation was the subject of scrutiny in 2004. In 2002, on the back of strong performance at Cendant, Silverman signed a 10-year contract that provided for medical benefits, office space as well as travel perks including a corporate airplane and a company car and driver. Of greater attention was the compensation Silverman received in 2003. Silverman's 2003 compensation was estimated at $60 million, which included $14 million in cash salary and bonus, $37 million in stock options and $4.6 million paid as premiums on a company funded life insurance policy.

In September 2006, Silverman championed the separation of Cendant Corporation into four independent companies. Cendant spun off its real estate brokerage division, Realogy which was sold to Apollo Global Management and sold its travel distribution services division, Travelport, to The Blackstone Group. Cendant's hospitality services division, became a separate company Wyndham Worldwide. The remaining Cendant Corporation, which renamed itself Avis Budget Group, operates the company's car rental businesses.

=== Career since 2006 ===
In February 2009, Silverman assumed a position as chief operating officer of Apollo Global Management, a New York-based private equity firm.

In March 2012, Silverman assumed a position as Vice Chairman of Asset Management at Guggenheim Partners, a New York-based private equity firm.

== Personal life ==
Silverman has been married three times. In 1965, he married Susan Anne Herson; they had two children and divorced in 1977. In 1978, he married Nancy Ann Kraner; they had one child and divorced in 2012 after 30 years of marriage. In 2009 he moved into an apartment in 15 Central Park West in Manhattan.
