= Glenn Laumeister =

Glenn Laumeister is a serial entrepreneur and CEO.

He is currently the CEO of AllWork, a freelancer management and payment platform for the Gig Economy. Prior to AllWork he launched and scaled numerous E-commerce and SaaS businesses, including CoachMarket, an online marketplace that connects individuals and organizations with career and executive coaches; Thuzio, a freelancer marketplace for professional athletes; and PartStore.com, an E-commerce, Saas and supply chain business for consumer electronic, computer and appliance replacement parts.

He co-founded PartStore, which developed to over $75m in revenue. The company's awards include the INC 500 list, and Deloitte’s top 500 growth businesses nationally. Laumeister was selected as an Ernst and Young Entrepreneur of the Year finalist.

Prior experience included working for CUC International (now Cendant) building AutoVantage, a national car buying network; AAdvantage Dining, a network of 2,000 fine dining restaurants for American Airlines; and Shoppers Advantage, a catalog shopping business with over $120m in annual sales.

Laumeister began his career working for General Motors in Germany, where he doubled the size of their European automatic transmission business to over $120m in annual revenue and established a sales and marketing office in Frankfurt Germany selling to Jaguar, Rolls-Royce, Opel, Volvo and BMW.

Laumeister graduated with a BA in International Relations and German from Colgate University, and received an MBA from the Thunderbird School of Global Management.
