= Webloyalty =

American technology company

Webloyalty is an online marketing company, part of Affinion Group, that runs reward programs 'Shopper Discounts & Rewards' and 'Complete Savings'. These programs require a monthly subscription in return for access to discounts similar to those on a cashback website. Previously, the company's marketing practices have attracted significant controversy and substantial lawsuits.

Its founding partner and CEO was Richard Fernandes, who stepped down from his role in May 2013.

== History ==
Webloyalty launched its first online discount programs in the United States in 1999. It later launched the 'Shopper Discounts & Rewards' program in the UK in 2007. It introduced its 'Remises & Réductions' program in France in 2008 and 'Shoppen und Sparen' in Germany in 2010.

In 2011, Webloyalty was acquired by American customer engagement company Affinion Group. Webloyalty launched 'Privilegios en Compras' in Spain and 'Acquisti e Risparmi' in Italy, with Ryanair as its primary launch client that same year.

Webloyalty announced in February 2013 that it will expand its programs into the Republic of Ireland.

== Operations ==
Webloyalty (and other loyalty program companies) have contracts with popular retail websites to offer various 'online membership programs'. When a consumer has made a purchase on one of contracted retail websites, the consumer will be offered a cashback or money-off voucher for the next purchase via a pop-up ad or image banner.

By clicking on the link, the consumer is offered a sign-up page where personal details are required to complete the registration for the service. The consumer is asked to fill in their personal details, payment method and agree with the terms and conditions.

Up until 2010, Webloyalty and other loyalty companies used a different method for registration. Via the so-called 'data-pass', these companies were able to instantly make use of the consumer's credit card data after its initial purchase on the retailers’ website and bill the consumer a monthly membership fee. As the consumer was not prompted to enter their payment data again to register, many were unaware that clicking 'yes' enrolled them automatically in a monthly paid program, often only discovering months later that they subscribed.

This practice generated numerous complaints resulting in coverage on international newspapers and money advice websites. These practices were described as "misleading, but [...] not illegal'.

This resulted in some retailers in the UK, including Debenhams and B&Q, to sever and suspend their links with Webloyalty after a wave of complaints.

Webloyalty and other loyalty program companies no longer makes use of the data-pass method. They now require all consumers to manually re-enter their credit card details in order to register.

== Court cases, convictions, and settlements for fraudulent practices ==
Affinion has paid millions of dollars in civil claims and state attorney general claims, in 47 states, for unfair and deceptive trade practices, and faced multiple class-action lawsuits. For example, Afinion settled a case with the state of New York for consumer fraud, as a result of which a fund is maintained to fully reimburse people whose money was stolen by Affinion's fraudulent practices.

=== US Senate Committee on Commerce, Science and Transportation Hearing ===
The United States Senate Committee on Commerce, Science and Transportation announced on 28 May 2009 a Senate Commerce Committee investigation, led by chairman Jay Rockefeller into "certain e-commerce marketing practices that generate thousands of mysterious monthly charges to consumer credit cards". On 17 November 2009, Webloyalty in the US, Affinion Group and Vertrue were called before the Committee on Commerce, Science and Transportation to explain its business practices during a full committee hearing on "Aggressive Sales Tactics on the Internet and their Impact on American Consumers".

On 17 November 2009, Webloyalty in the United States, Affinion Group and Vertrue were called before the Committee on Commerce, Science and Transportation to explain its business practices during a full committee hearing on "Aggressive Sales Tactics on the Internet and their Impact on American Consumers".

The hearings investigated the companies' business practices, whereby consumers were enrolled in a "membership rewards" or "loyalty" club, often without their knowledge, after having purchased something through a separate website.

The committee investigation found that Webloyalty and other "loyalty club" companies "used aggressive sales tactics to enroll online consumers in services without their consent".

The chairman of the committee introduced the "Restore Online Shoppers’ Confidence Act" on 5 January 2010 to "end the deceptive online sales tactics" as a conclusion to the investigation.

The Congress' act was considered and passed by the Senate on 30 November 2010, and considered and passed the House of Representatives on 15 December 2010. The act was eventually approved on 29 December 2010.

Webloyalty responded on 19 May 2010 to the introduction of the act by stating it had "refined its practices to help address senators' concerns and that it will fully comply with the bill once it is enacted" and that it changed its business practices by requiring consumers to enter their full credit card information to enroll. Additionally, the company claimed to have improved their after-sales (or post-enrollment) process by sending frequent communications to its members and introduced “no hassle” cancellations.
