= Chartwell (disambiguation) =

Chartwell, near Westerham, Kent, England, is the former home of Sir Winston Churchill.

Chartwell may also refer to:

- Chartwell, Hamilton, New Zealand
  - Chartwell Shopping Centre
- Chartwell, Wellington, a suburb of Wellington City, New Zealand
- Chartwell, Gauteng, a suburb of Johannesburg, South Africa
- Chartwell Leisure, an American hotel company
- Chartwell Court, a residential tower block in Brighton, England
- Chartwell Mansion, Bel-Air, California, United States
- Chartwell Retirement Residences, seniors' housing provider in Canada
- Chartwell Technology, a software developer
- Chartwells, a division of Compass Group
