= Restore Online Shoppers' Confidence Act =

United States federal law

- Long title: To protect consumers from certain aggressive sales tactics on the Internet.
- Enacted by: the 111th United States Congress

Citations
- Public law: Pub. L. 111–345 (text) (PDF)

Legislative history
- Introduced in the Senate as S. 3307 by Jay Rockefeller (D-WV) on May 19, 2010; Committee consideration by United States Senate Committee on Commerce, Science, and Transportation; Passed the Senate on November 30, 2010; Passed the House on December 15, 2010; Signed into law by President Barack Obama on December 29, 2010

The Restore Online Shoppers' Confidence Act (ROSCA) is a United States federal law passed during the 111th United States Congress and signed into law by President Barack Obama. The legislation was introduced as S.B.3386 by Senator Jay Rockefeller (D-WV) on May 19, 2010, and signed into law on December 29, 2010.

The legislation was drafted to protect online consumers from being automatically enrolled in services that would lead to them receiving recurring charges without their explicit consent. Additionally, the law places certain limits on online sellers' ability to share consumer data with third party actors.

== History and background ==
The bill was introduced in the aftermath of the release of two reports by the committee regarding the spread of deceptive internet sales practices. One of the reports, titled "Aggressive Sales Tactics on the Internet and Their Impact on American Consumers", centered on how three companies (Affinion, Webloyalty, and Vertrue) engaged in deceptive practices to auto-enroll consumers without their consent.

Senator Jay Rockefeller, then-chair of the Senate Committee on Commerce, Science, and Transportation, formally introduced the legislation as S.B.3386 May 19, 2010. The legislation passed both houses of Congress ultimately signed into law by President Barack Obama on December 29, 2010.

== Provisions ==
ROSCA limits sellers ability to engage in "negative option marketing", which refers to a tactic in which an online seller considers a customer's silence or inaction as acceptance of an offer and permission to charge them.

The legislation mandates that online sellers disclose specific terms of their offers to customers. Additionally, the law requires covered sellers to directly obtain consumers' billing information, rather than obtain the information through third-party online partners.

== Reception and legacy ==
The Washington Post reported in 2021 that the law successfully "combated some abuses, such as the sharing of sensitive customer data with third parties" and put rules in place requiring companies to implement "simple mechanisms for a consumer to stop recurring charges".

However, the report noted that the law has criticism from consumer advocates, who argue the law provides companies' loopholes to charge customers while limiting their ability to stop recurring charges. This includes company policies that require customers to sign up for a service online but prevent cancelations using the same method, and instead require customers to call customer service during business hours to cancel.
