= Gabriel Wilensky =

American author, software developer and entrepreneur

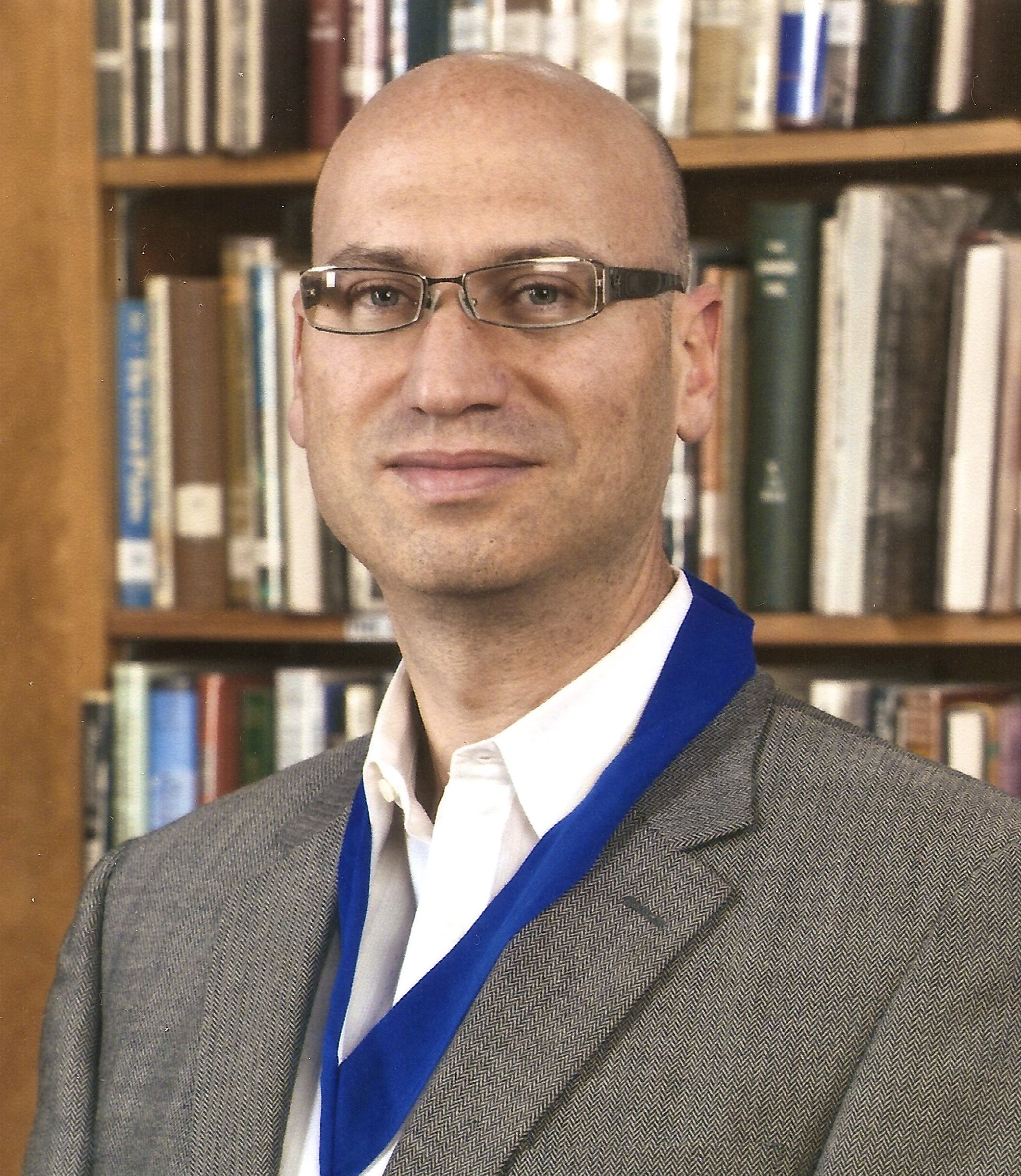
- Born: April 23, 1964 (age 62)
- Occupations: Author, Software Developer
- Writing career
- Notable work: Six Million Crucifixions
- Website: www.gabrielwilensky.com

Gabriel Wilensky (born April 23, 1964) is an American author, software developer and entrepreneur. He was born in Uruguay, where his Eastern-European grandparents had emigrated to before the Second World War. He is the author of the books Six Million Crucifixions (2010), which traces the history of antisemitism in Christianity and the role it played in the Holocaust, Two Dozen Thoughts (2022), a collection of essays on topics related to antisemitism and Israel, and Fuel for Thought (2025), which examines the changes needed in both society and individuals to create a future guided by reason, compassion, and progress, leading to a more enlightened world.

== Software development ==
Wilensky co-founded the software company Gryphon Software in the early 1990s. The company produced the software product Morph, which introduced the computer graphics effect of morphing to personal computers. Gryphon Software then developed a pioneering new line of edutainment products, the Activity Centers. Gryphon developed many products in that line, some of which used well-known characters from Disney, Warner/DC Comics, and others. The Activity Center line of products introduced video from the feature films and cartoons in the application. Gryphon was acquired by Cendant Software (then CUC International).

Wilensky contributed to the development of these various products in the areas of software and user interface design, product management, audio and video production and new research and development work on audio/video compression. His software was used to make some of the special effects of several feature films, such as Francis Ford Coppola's Bram Stoker's Dracula (1992), Robin Hood: Men in Tights (1993), Dragon: The Bruce Lee Story (1993) and others.

After Gryphon Software Wilensky worked on the development of other software products in the areas of user interface software for wireless devices, web site development, and TV broadcasting for mobile devices. Most recently he was responsible for the development of the GoPro software applications.

== Research and writing Six Million Crucifixions ==
Wilensky spent years of research into the question of why the Holocaust happened. He used his technical background for a methodical study of the question and then wrote Six Million Crucifixions: How Christian Teachings About Jews Paved the Road to the Holocaust, published in 2009.

Six Million Crucifixions provides an account of the almost two-thousand-year-old Christian teaching of contempt for Jews, and argues that it was this relentless animosity and even hatred toward Jews and Judaism in predominantly Christian lands that laid the foundation on which racial antisemitism stood, and which eventually led to the Holocaust. As Holocaust scholar John K. Roth argued in the foreword of the book, "Absent Christianity, no Holocaust would have taken place."

The book provides an account of how antisemitism developed from the very early days of the Christian movement into full-blown hatred by the time of the Crusades. Six Million Crucifixions shows how anti-Jewish sentiment stemmed out of Christian Scriptures and the teachings of the Church Fathers, until it became second-nature to European Christians. As Dr. Carol Rittner, Distinguished Professor of Holocaust & Genocide Studies at The Richard Stockton College wrote, "Too many of those hate-filled words had their origin in the Christian Scriptures and were uttered by Christian preachers and teachers, by Christians generally, for nearly two millennia."

The book also describes the role of both the Catholic and Protestant churches in the period leading to and beyond the Second World War, and sharply criticizes the Catholic Church (in particular), as well as the Protestant churches for their lack of loud and clear objection to the extermination of the Jews, for the assistance some members of the clergy gave the Nazis in their persecution of the Jews and the help some members of the Vatican gave to people who should have been regarded as war criminals to escape justice after the war. As Holocaust scholar and Director of the Sigi Ziering Institute Michael Berenbaum wrote, "Gabriel Wilensky's Six Million Crucifixions is a powerful and passionate indictment of the Vatican for acts of omission and acts of commission."

Six Million Crucifixions further presents material that he asserts could have been used for a potential indictment of any Christian clergy who may have been guilty of crimes of incitement and/or persecution against Jews before, during and after World War II, had the Allies pursued another international prosecution after the Nuremberg Trials.

== Fuel for Thought ==
In 2025, Gabriel Wilensky published Fuel for Thought: Ideas to Revolutionize Our Lives, Improve Civilization, and Build a Better World. This work examines factors hindering human progress and societal well-being, offering recommendations for actions that individuals—such as parents, educators, policymakers, and concerned citizens—can take to foster a more enlightened society. The book emphasizes the importance of education, critical thinking, and the reduction of superstitious beliefs to create an environment conducive to human flourishing. Wilensky advocates for empowering youth through enhanced reasoning skills and a solid scientific and humanistic foundation, aiming to establish a continuous state of enlightenment for a better future.

Wilensky also explores ways to improve governance by advocating for electoral reforms that would lead to choosing better leaders and initiatives. He argues that democratic systems should recognize variations in voter competence, suggesting that more informed individuals should have greater influence in shaping policy. Additionally, he promotes a meritocratic approach to leadership, emphasizing the importance of electing highly capable and ethical individuals who prioritize reason, science, and long-term societal progress.

The book has received commendations for its insightful analysis and practical recommendations. Michael Shermer, Presidential Fellow at Chapman University and publisher of Skeptic Magazine, described it as “a delightful tutorial on how to think.” Frederick M. Hess, Senior Fellow and Director of Education Policy Studies at the American Enterprise Institute, noted that “those thinking about the future of education would do well to explore this intriguing volume.”

== Awards ==
- Two Software and Information Industry Association Codie awards
- BYTE Magazine Award of Excellence
- UCSD Connect Most Innovative New Product Award
- Bronze Award in New Media Magazine's InVision Contest
- Two MacUser Editor's Choice Awards - Finalist
- Discover Magazine Award for Technological Innovation - Finalist

== Published works ==
- Six Million Crucifixions: How Christian Teachings About Jews Paved the Road to the Holocaust, San Diego : QWERTY Publishers, 2010, ISBN 978-0-9843346-4-3
- Two Dozen Thoughts: Collected Essays on Christian Antisemitism and the Role it Played in the Holocaust, San Diego : QWERTY Publishers, 2022
- Fuel for Thought: Ideas to Revolutionize Our Lives, Improve Civilization, and Build a Better World, San Diego : QWERTY Publishers, 2025, ISBN 978-0-9843346-0-5
