= NetMarket =

Online marketplace

- Type: Subsidiary
- Founded: 1994
- Founder: Dan Kohn, Roger Lee, Guy H. T. Haskin, Eiji Hirai
- Parent: Trilegiant
- Website: netmarket.com/store (dead link)

NetMarket is an online marketplace owned by Trilegiant that sells various goods ranging from electronics to jewelry. It was founded in 1994 by Dan Kohn and Roger Lee, both former London School of Economics students, and by Guy H. T. Haskin and Eiji Hirai from Swarthmore College. The New York Times has credited the company with performing the first secure retail transaction on the Internet.

== History ==
NetMarket was initially conceived by Dan Kohn while he was studying at the London School of Economics after finishing an honors degree in economics from Swarthmore College. He recruited classmate and Yale graduate Roger Lee to become president of the company. The company's management team was rounded out by Guy H. T. Haskin and Eiji Hirai, both from Swarthmore and both hired for their technical skills. The firm's initial headquarters was a house in Nashua, New Hampshire. It started out selling goods such as CDs and books for various offline stores using non-digital payments.

On August 11, 1994, NetMarket sold Ten Summoner's Tales, a CD by Sting, to Phil Brandenberger of Philadelphia using a credit card over the Internet. The New York Times characterized this as "...apparently the first retail transaction on the Internet using a readily available version of powerful data encryption software designed to guarantee privacy." The encryption used in the transaction was provided by the Pretty Good Privacy (PGP) program, incorporated into the X Mosaic browser. The author of PGP, Phil Zimmermann, called the transaction an important step towards the creation of digital cash.

NetMarket was soon purchased by CUC International and despite expectations to the contrary, continued to be successful. While general online malls were superseded by specialty shops and forced to close, NetMarket continued to expand the range of its inventory. In 1997 the chairman of CUC estimated the company could fill approximately 20% of a family's retail needs with that number going up to 95% in three years. The company was also profitable, estimating doing more than $1 billion in sales in 1998. The Economist called NetMarket's business model the third wave of online retailing - one site providing goods found in an entire mall, but focused on the efficiency and low prices provided by specialized retailers. Also in 1997, CUC paid America Online $50 million to set up and promote NetMarket's services on AOL's Shopping Channel.

In 1999, NetMarket, now owned by Cendant, had its ordering system breached due to a bug in its software. Customer names, addresses, and phone numbers could have been shown publicly along with order details for as many as 983,000 orders stretching back to June 1998.

NetMarket was spun off by Cendant in 2001 under a new parent company, Trilegiant.
