= Six Million =

Six Million may refer to:

== In history ==
- The estimated 5.1 to 6.2 million Jews (often rounded to six million) murdered during the Holocaust
- Nakam was a group of Jewish Holocaust survivors that tried to kill six million ethnic Germans

== In popular culture ==
Six Million is a number incorporated into the names of various works over time:

=== Works about the Holocaust ===
- Did Six Million Really Die?, a 1974 Holocaust denial pamphlet allegedly written by British National Front member Richard Verrall, and published by Nazi propagandist Ernst Zündel. The pamphlet is banned in Germany and South Africa.
- Paper Clips Project (Six Million Paper Clips), a U.S. middle school history project started in 1998, forming the basis for:
  - Das Büroklammer-Projekt (The Paper Clip Project), a 2000 history and documentary book written and published in Germany by Peter W. Schroeder
  - Paper Clips, a 2004 documentary film by Elliot Berlin and Joe Fab
- Six Million Crucifixions, a 2010 history book by Gabriel Wilensky
- Six Million and One, a 2011 documentary film by David Fisher

=== Other works ===
- Symphony of Six Million, a critically acclaimed 1932 U.S. Pre-Code film directed by Gregory La Cava
- The Six Million Dollar Man, a 1973–1978 U.S. science fiction television show
- Six Million Ways to Die, a 1996 album by Cutty Ranks
- Six Million Ways to Live, a 2001/2005 electronica album by Dub Pistols
- "The Six Million Dollar Mon", seventh episode of the seventh season of Futurama, first aired in 2012
