= Vivendi Games =

American video game company

Vivendi Games, Inc.
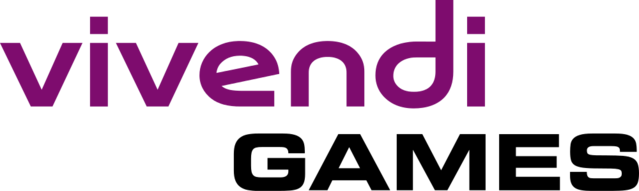
- Final logo, used from 2006 to 2008

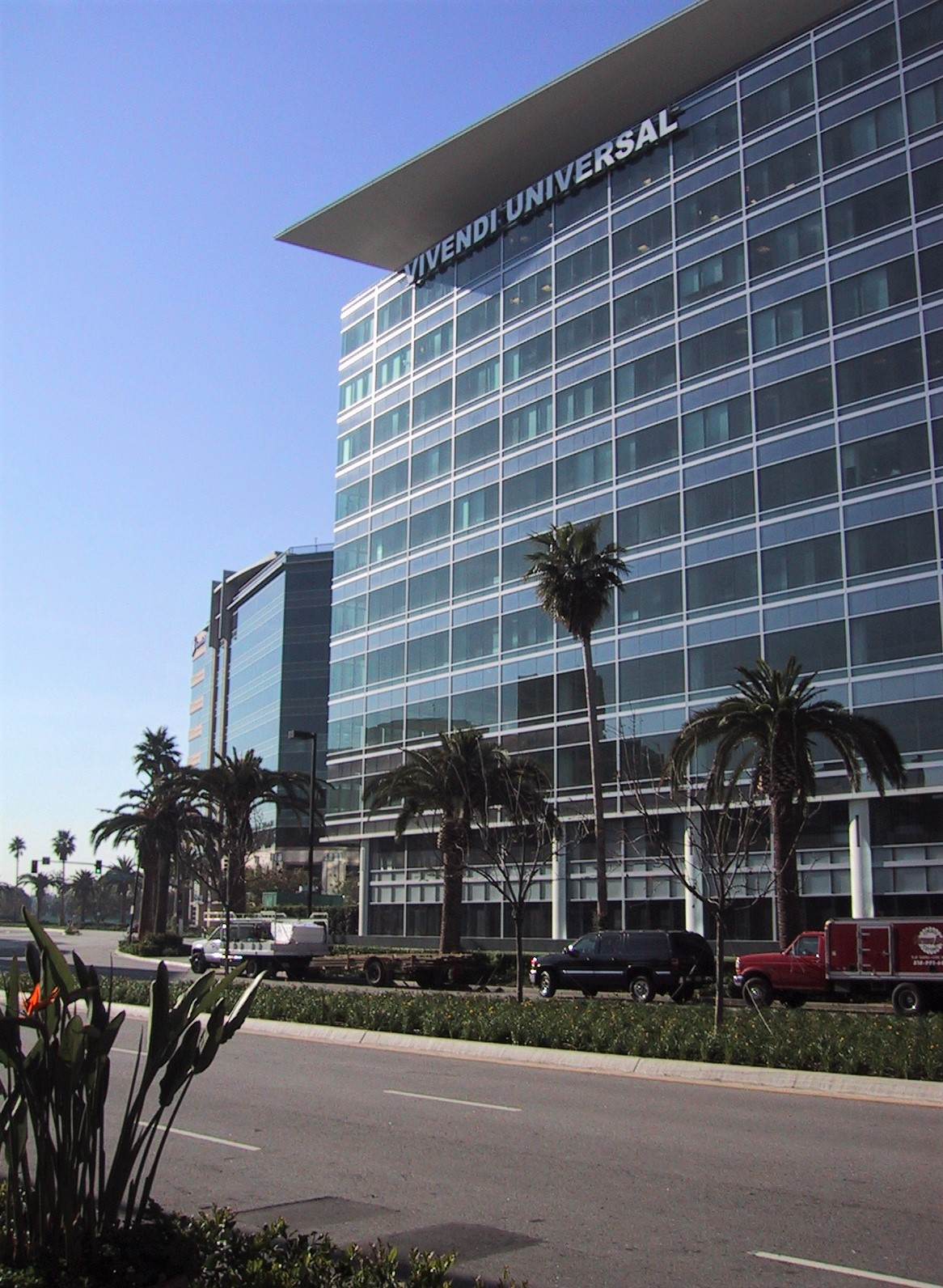
- Vivendi Universal Games' headquarters at 6080 Center Drive in Los Angeles in 2001
- Formerly: CUC Software (1996–1997); Cendant Software (1997–1998); Havas Interactive (1998–2001); Vivendi Universal Interactive Publishing (2001); Vivendi Universal Games (2001–2006)
- Type: Division
- Industry: Video games
- Founded: July 24, 1996; 30 years ago in Torrance, California
- Defunct: July 10, 2008; 18 years ago
- Fate: Merged with Activision
- Successor: Activision Blizzard
- Headquarters: 4247 South Minnewawa Avenue, Fresno, California, U.S.
- Area served: North America; Europe
- Key people: Bruce Hack (CEO)
- Parent: CUC International (1996–1997); Cendant (1997–1998); Vivendi Universal Publishing (1998–2002); Vivendi (2002–2008)
- Website: vivendi.com (archived October 24, 2007)

Vivendi Games, Inc., formerly Vivendi Universal Games, Inc., was an American video game publisher and holding company based in Los Angeles. It was founded in 1996 as CUC Software, the publishing subsidiary of CUC International, after the latter acquired video game companies Davidson & Associates and Sierra On-Line. Between 1997 and 2001, the company switched parents and names multiple times before ending up organized under Vivendi Universal (later renamed Vivendi). On July 10, 2008, Vivendi Games merged with Activision to create Activision Blizzard.

== History ==
=== CUC/Cendant ===
On February 21, 1996, CUC International announced its intention to acquire Davidson & Associates (including Blizzard Entertainment) and Sierra On-Line, two American video game companies, in a US$1.8 billion stock swap. The deal closed on July 24, 1996. CUC International previously only operated membership shopping clubs, wherefore analysts were surprised by the company's move into the software industry.

Subsequently, following the acquisitions, CUC International established CUC Software around the Torrance, California-based operations of Davidson & Associates to oversee the new video game properties. Under that new umbrella, both Davidson & Associates and Sierra On-Line would act independently from CUC International. Bob Davidson, co-founder of Davidson & Associates, became chairman and chief executive of the new establishment. On November 5 that year, CUC International announced that it would additionally acquire Knowledge Adventure, another developer, in a stock deal valued between $50 million and US$100 million. The acquisition was completed on February 3, 1997. On February 10, Davidson announced that he had stepped down from his positions at CUC Software, and that his wife, Jan, ceased as president of Davidson & Associates, while both Davidsons stayed on CUC International's board of directors. Christopher McLeod, an executive vice-president for CUC International, took over CUC Software in Bob Davidson's place. In April 1997, CUC International acquired Berkeley Systems for an undisclosed sum.

On May 28, 1997, CUC International announced plans to merge with Hospitality Franchise Systems to create a single, "one-stop" entity. The merger was finalized in December that year and created Cendant. As a result of the merger, CUC Software was renamed Cendant Software.

=== Havas/Vivendi ===
On November 20, 1998, French media company Havas (acquired by Vivendi earlier that year) announced that it would acquire Cendant Software for $800 million in cash, with up to an additional $200 million contingent on its performance. Subsequently, the division was renamed Havas Interactive.

On May 16, 2001, Havas Interactive was renamed Vivendi Universal Interactive Publishing, after Havas itself became Vivendi Universal Publishing months prior. The new name was likely due to the merger between Universal and Vivendi; the company also received ownership of properties from Universal Interactive Studios. Under the new name, the company was split into two parts: Vivendi Universal Interactive Publishing North America and Vivendi Universal Interactive Publishing International, both of which took responsibility for their respective publishing regions. On November 13, 2001, both parts were streamlined under the name Vivendi Universal Games. This new company was placed directly under Vivendi Universal after Vivendi Universal Publishing was sold off.

When Vivendi Universal sold all of its media operations to General Electric in October 2003, Vivendi Universal still held on to Vivendi Universal Games. On March 3, 2006, with the sale completed, Vivendi Universal announced it would be dropping the "Universal" part of its name. The same day, the company opened a mobile games division known as Vivendi Universal Games Mobile.

=== Merger with Activision ===
In December 2007, American publisher Activision announced a proposed merger deal with Vivendi Games that would create a new holding company named Activision Blizzard. The deal was approved by Activision's shareholders on July 8, 2008, and the merger was finalized on July 10, creating Activision Blizzard while dissolving Vivendi Games. Bruce Hack, who was chief executive officer of Vivendi Games, became vice-chairman and chief corporate officer of the new company. Many of Vivendi Games' properties were later dropped by Activision, citing that they would not make for a good fit for the company's long-term strategy.

== Subsidiaries ==
Name	Founded	Acquired	Defunct/Sold	Ref.
Davidson & Associates	1982	July 24, 1996	1998	
Blizzard Entertainment	February 1991	July 24, 1996	2008	(Note: Part of Davidson & Associates since March 1994)
Sierra Entertainment	1979	July 24, 1996	2004 (as a company); 2008 (as a label)	
Coktel Vision	1984	July 24, 1996	2005	(Note: Part of Sierra at the time)
Knowledge Adventure	1991	February 1997	2004	
Berkeley Systems	1987	April 1997	2000	
Universal Interactive	January 4, 1994	June 2000	2004	(Note: Absorbed through the Vivendi–Universal merger in June 2000, became label)
NDA Productions	March 2002	N/A	2003	
Black Label Games	August 2002	N/A	2003	
Massive Entertainment	1997	October 2002	2008	
Fox Interactive	May 1994	March 2003	2006	(Note: Acquired from News Corporation in March 2003, became label)
Radical Entertainment	September 1991	March 2005	2008	
Swordfish Studios	2002	June 2005	2008	
High Moon Studios	April 2001	January 2006	2008	
Vivendi Games Mobile	March 2006	N/A	2008	
Centerscore	2000	September 2006	2008	
Wanako Games	2002	February 2007	2008	
