= Vacasa =

Vacation rental management company

Vacasa, Inc.
- Type: Subsidiary
- Industry: Travel (lodging)
- Founded: 2009; 17 years ago, in Portland
- Founder: Eric Breon; Cliff Johnson
- Headquarters: Portland, Oregon
- Key people: Rob Greyber (CEO); Bruce Schuman (CFO); John Banczak, COO; T.J. Clark (CCO); Bob Milne (SVP) Operations
- Products: vacation rentals, vacation rental property management, vacation rental real estate, lodging, vacation rental community management, vacation rental interior design
- Revenue: ▲US$889 Million (2021)
- Parent: Casago
- Website: vacasa.com

Vacasa, Inc. is an international vacation rental management company based in Portland, Oregon. It provides property management services for over 35,000 vacation rentals in North America, Belize, and Costa Rica. Vacasa manages properties in 34 U.S. states.

== History ==
Eric Breon, along with attorney Cliff Johnson, co-founded Vacasa in 2009 after experiencing difficulties renting out his family vacation home in Long Beach, Washington.

In June 2014, Vacasa topped the Portland Business Journal's list of Fastest-Growing Private 100 companies, with an established three-year growth rate of 3,034.59%. In August 2014, it was named the #9 fastest-growing privately held company in the nation by Inc. Magazine in its annual Inc. 5000 list, with an updated three-year growth rate of 16,192%. On November 16, 2016 Vacasa was ranked number 67 out of 500 on the 2016 Technology Fast 500 by Deloitte, which recognizes the fastest-growing technology companies in North America.

In March 2018, Vacasa announced the company would be expanding its Portland office to a newly constructed building in the Pearl District. The 61,000 square foot space provides the company space for an additional 400 employees in Portland.

On October 2, 2018, Vacasa acquired Oasis Collections, which was previously owned in part by Hyatt Hotels Corp.

In 2019, Vacasa acquired Wyndham Vacation Rentals from Wyndham Destinations for $162 million. Vacasa has also partnered with Google to integrate available rental properties into search results for traveling and lodging. It is the first vacation rental management company to do so.

Eric Breon stepped down as CEO of Vacasa on February 11, 2020. Vacasa board member and former OpenTable CEO Matt Roberts replaced Breon as interim chief, and was then named permanent CEO in the summer of 2020.

On April 1, 2021, Vacasa finalized the acquisition of TurnKey Vacation Rentals, adding more than 6,000 U.S. properties to its portfolio, and bringing its total property count to more than 30,000 units. On August 24, 2022, it announced former Expedia executive Rob Greyber will succeed Matt Roberts as CEO.

In May 2024, Vacasa announced a workforce reduction of approximately 13%, affecting 800 employees, as part of a restructuring to address continued net losses. This followed an earlier cut of 5% of its staff in February 2024.

Following a 97% decline in its stock price and multiple rounds of layoffs, Vacasa agreed to be taken private by portfolio company Casago. On May 1, 2025, Casago completed the acquisition in an all-cash transaction valued at approximately $130 million ($5.30 per share). Upon closing, Vacasa's stock was delisted from the Nasdaq exchange.

As of 2026, Vacasa's Maine portfolio is managed by Tides to Pines, a Casago franchise.

== Funding ==
On April 12, 2016, Vacasa announced securing $35 million in financing led by Series A investor Level Equity. On November 14, 2016 Vacasa announced extending the Series A round to $40 million following a $5 million investment from risk management provider Assurant. This is the first round of outside capital the company accepted, as it was bootstrapped since its founding in 2009.

On October 17, 2017, Vacasa raised $103.5 million in Series B funding. To date, this is the largest funding round ever raised in the vacation rental management sector, and the largest series B funding round ever raised for an Oregon technology company.

On October 18, 2018, Vacasa raised a Series B extension of $64 million, bringing the company's total funds raised to $207.5 million. In 2018, Vacasa became the largest vacation rental management company in North America overtaking Wyndham Vacation Rentals.

On October 29, 2019, Vacasa announced it had raised $319 million in Series C funding valuing the company at over $1 billion.

On June 2, 2020, Vacasa announced it had raised $108 million in Series D funding led by existing investor Silver Lake.

In July 2021, Vacasa announced that it would become a publicly traded company through a merger with TPG Pace Solutions, a special purpose acquisition company (SPAC) sponsored by TPG Pace Group. The business combination provided Vacasa with an equity valuation of $4.5 billion. Vacasa debuted on the NASDAQ with the completion of the merger on December 7.

== Technology ==
The company developed the Vacasa Field App to provide its local operations teams with real-time information and updates on home maintenance tickets, as well as its HomeCare Hub, which includes a scheduler algorithm that optimises home clean scheduling across geographic regions.

In November 2021, the company released its Vacasa Homeowner app to share home performance information with their homeowners in a native mobile experience.

== Real estate ==
In July 2018, Vacasa launched Vacasa Real Estate to support buyers and sellers of vacation rentals through a national expert agent network. As Vacasa's real estate arm continued to expand, the company launched brokerages in Arizona, Florida, Hawaii, Oregon and South Carolina, with future plans to expand throughout the country. Vacasa also provides real-estate brokerage services in North Carolina through Vacasa North Carolina LLC.

== Other services ==
In 2018, the company launched Vacasa Community Association Management and Multifamily Services to round out its full suite of services for vacation homeowners.

In 2019, Vacasa launched an interior design service for property owners and developers.

== Awards ==
- Growth Stage Company Award, 2018 Tom Holce Entrepreneurship Awards
- Technology Association of Oregon's Most Disruptive Technology of the Year Award 2016
- Deloitte Fast 500 for 2016
- Pearl Business Association's Technology Champion of the Year for 2016
- Better Business Bureau's Large Business of the Year Award for 2015
- Inc. 5000 Fastest Growing Private Companies in America 2014
