= Dan Kohn =

American entrepreneur (1972–2020)

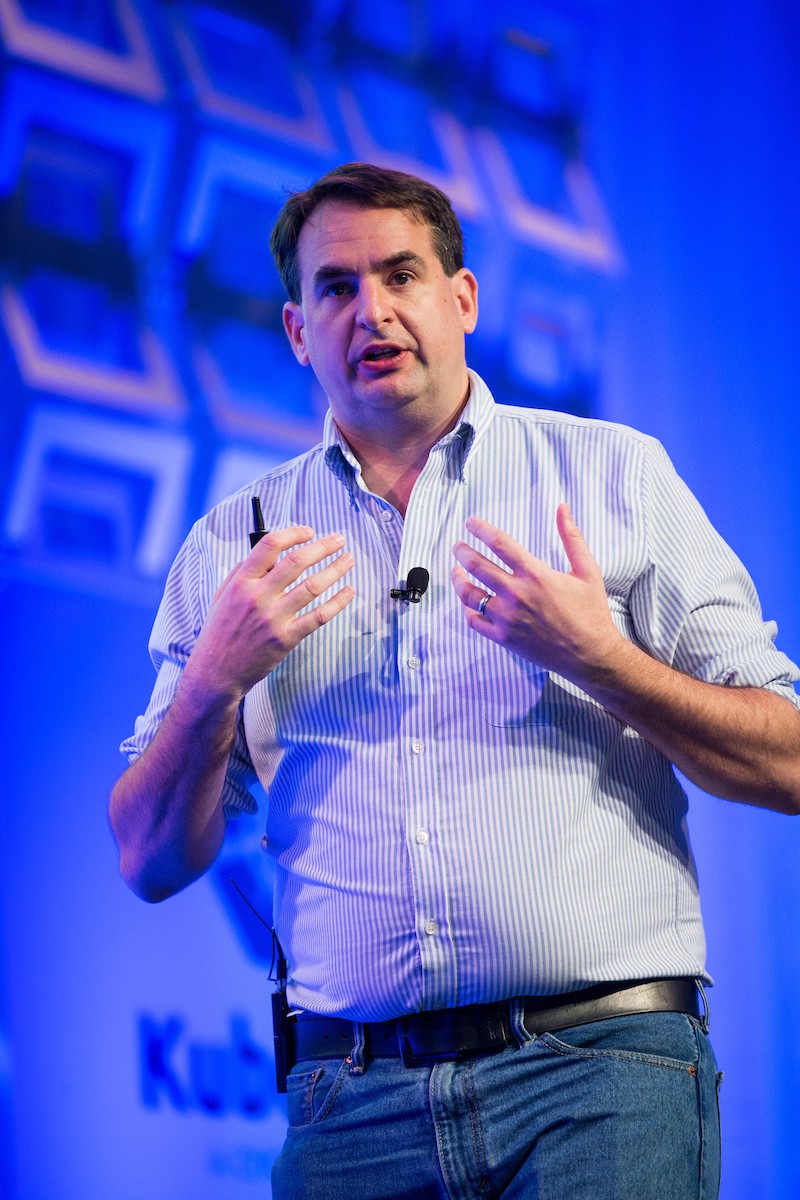
- Kohn in 2016
- Born: November 20, 1972; Philadelphia, Pennsylvania, U.S.
- Died: November 1, 2020 (aged 47); New York City, New York, U.S.
- Education: Swarthmore College (B.S.)
- Known for: First secure commercial transaction on the web
- Spouse: Julie Pullen
- Children: 2
- Website: www.dankohn.com

Dan Kohn (November 20, 1972 – November 1, 2020) was an American serial entrepreneur and nonprofit executive who led the Linux Foundation's Public Health initiative. He was the executive director at Cloud Native Computing Foundation (CNCF), which sustains and integrates open source cloud software including Kubernetes and Fluentd, through 2020. The first company he founded, NetMarket, conducted the first secure commercial transaction on the web in 1994.

== Early life and education ==
Kohn was born in Philadelphia on November 20, 1972. He studied at Phillips Exeter Academy, and graduated with a bachelor's degree from Swarthmore College in 1994.

== Career ==
=== NetMarket ===
Kohn co-founded and was CEO of NetMarket, an online marketplace. On August 11, 1994, NetMarket sold Ten Summoner's Tales, a CD by Sting, to Phil Brandenberger of Philadelphia using a credit card over the Internet. The New York Times described this as "...the first retail transaction on the Internet using a readily available version of powerful data encryption software designed to guarantee privacy." The encryption used in the transaction was provided by the Pretty Good Privacy (PGP) program, incorporated into the X Mosaic browser.

=== Other work ===
Kohn worked as chief technology officer at Spreemo, a healthcare marketplace, and at Shopbeam, a shoppable ads startup. Earlier, he worked as vice president at Teledesic, the satellite-based Internet provider funded by Craig McCaw and Bill Gates and then became a general partner at Skymoon Ventures.

Kohn co-authored RFC 3023, XML Media Types, which defined how XML and MIME interoperate and is the origin of the widely used +suffix in MIME types. He also contributed two chapters to The Bogleheads' Guide to Retirement Planning.

=== The Linux Foundation and CNCF ===
As executive director of CNCF, Kohn helped expand CNCF membership to include the largest public cloud and enterprise software companies. He led the efforts to create a conformance standard for Kubernetes and a Kubernetes certified service provider program in 2017. During Kohn's tenure at CNCF, he oversaw the growth of KubeCon (the foundation's primary event) from 500 attendees in 2015 to over 12,000 at the KubeCon + CloudNativeCon North America 2019 in San Diego, California.

Kohn was chief operating officer of the Linux Foundation and helped launch the Linux Foundation's Core Infrastructure Initiative, a project created after Heartbleed to fund and support free and open-source software projects that are critical to the functioning of the Internet. More recently, he helped create their open source best practices badge.

As general manager of LF Public Health, Kohn helped "public health authorities use open source software to fight COVID-19 and other epidemics."

== Personal life ==
Kohn was married to climate scientist Julie Pullen. Pullen and Kohn had two sons.

=== Death ===
Kohn died of complications from colon cancer in New York City on November 1, 2020, at age 47.
