= Club Wyndham South Pacific =

- Company type: Subsidiary
- Industry: Hospitality, Timeshare
- Founded: 1999
- Headquarters: 1 Corporate Ct, Bundall Queensland, Australia
- Number of locations: 26
- Area served: Australia, New Zealand, Pacific
- Key people: Barry Robinson (CEO) and Managing Director
- Number of employees: 1,500 corporate
- Parent: Travel + Leisure Co.
- Website: clubwyndhamsp.com

Club Wyndham South Pacific (formerly Wyndham Vacation Resorts Asia Pacific and Trendwest South Pacific) is a wholly owned subsidiary of Travel + Leisure Co. which operates as a vacation ownership, allowing vacationers to own real estate interest in one of the Wyndham resorts.

== History ==
=== 20th century ===
Wyndham Vacation Resorts Asia-Pacific was founded in November 1999 and opened its Corporate Offices at Bundall on Australia's Gold Coast in January 2000. Wyndham Vacation Resorts Asia Pacific opened its first South Pacific sales center at WorldMark Denarau Island, Fiji in March 2000. This was followed by sales centers at Upper Mount Gravatt & Lutwyche (Brisbane), Lane Cove, Parramatta (Sydney), Newcastle (NSW), Port Macquarie (NSW), Hawthorn and Doncaster (Melbourne), Kirra Beach (Gold Coast), and Auckland (New Zealand).

== See also ==
- Wyndham Hotels and Resorts
- Resort Condominiums International, a timeshare company that is a division of Wyndham Destinations
