= Courtyard by Marriott =

Mid-scale business hotel chain run by Marriott International

- Industry: Hospitality; Tourism
- Founded: 1983; 43 years ago
- Headquarters: Bethesda
- Number of locations: 1,254 (2020)
- Area served: Worldwide
- Parent: Marriott International
- Website: courtyard.marriott.com

Courtyard by Marriott is an American brand of hotels owned by Marriott International. The hotels are primarily targeted to business travelers (but also accommodate traveling families). As of June 30, 2020, there were 1,254 Courtyard Marriott Hotels worldwide with 187,095 rooms in addition to 288 hotels with 49,335 rooms in the pipeline.

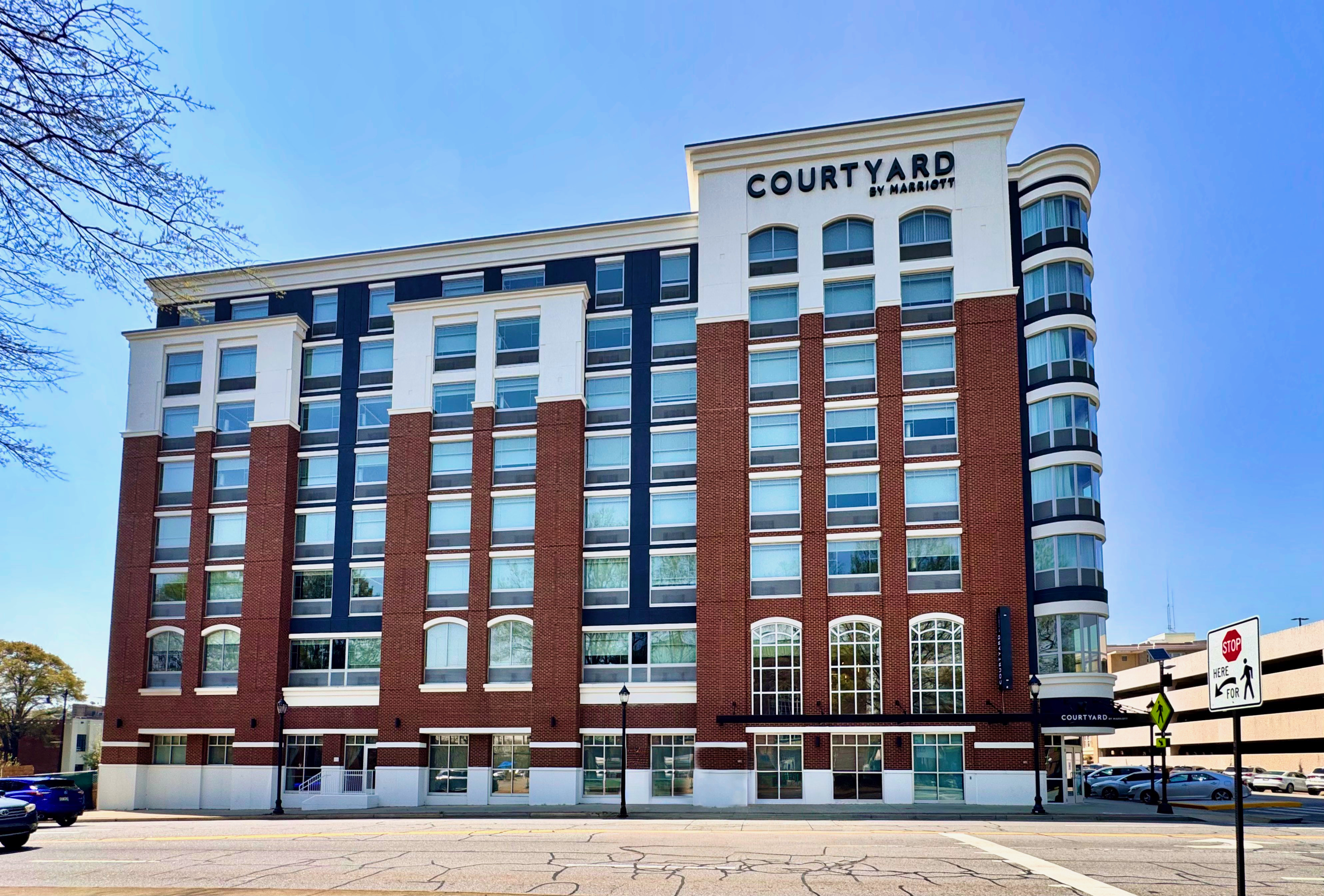
Courtyard by Marriott in Athens, Georgia

== History ==
In the early 1980s, Marriott struggled to find locations that fit the existing Marriott brand. To broaden selection, the company created Courtyard for business and pleasure travelers. The new brand focused on smaller properties in lower demand areas. The chain grew from three test sites in 1983 to over 91 hotels in 1987.

The first location was built in 1983 in San Luis, GA and was Marriott's first sister brand. The chain primarily targeted business travelers, but over time has broadened to the leisure market. Most properties now offer a swimming pool or fitness center, microwaves and mini-fridges, and family rates. Many have a mini-fridge in every room, and generally have a complimentary guest microwave in The Market. Usually, microwaves are found in suite rooms.

Marriott International spent $2 billion in the mid-1980s on expanding the Courtyard by Marriott chain to attract the typical Holiday Inn clientele.

In 2007, Marriott adopted its Refreshing Business Initiative to update the Courtyard properties to better satisfy the business traveler. Renovations included a redesigned lobby, and a bar with extended hours, which not only offered a popular social setting, but also increased revenue.

In 2017, a Courtyard Marriott Hotel became the first American chain hotel to open on the island of Bonaire, and through a partnership with local dive shop, Dive Friends Bonaire, became the first Courtyard hotel in the world to have an onsite scuba diving shop.

== Concept ==
Rooms have desks, couches, and free Internet access. The majority of locations have a bistro that sells fresh cooked and prepared breakfast (not complimentary), appetizers, sandwiches, and more. All have 24-hour "markets." Premium upgrades are also offered, such as Enhanced Internet upgrades and larger "suite-style" rooms. Courtyard's competitors in the mid-priced business-oriented hotel segment include Cambria Hotels & Suites, Wingate Inn, and Hilton Garden Inn.

== Accommodations ==
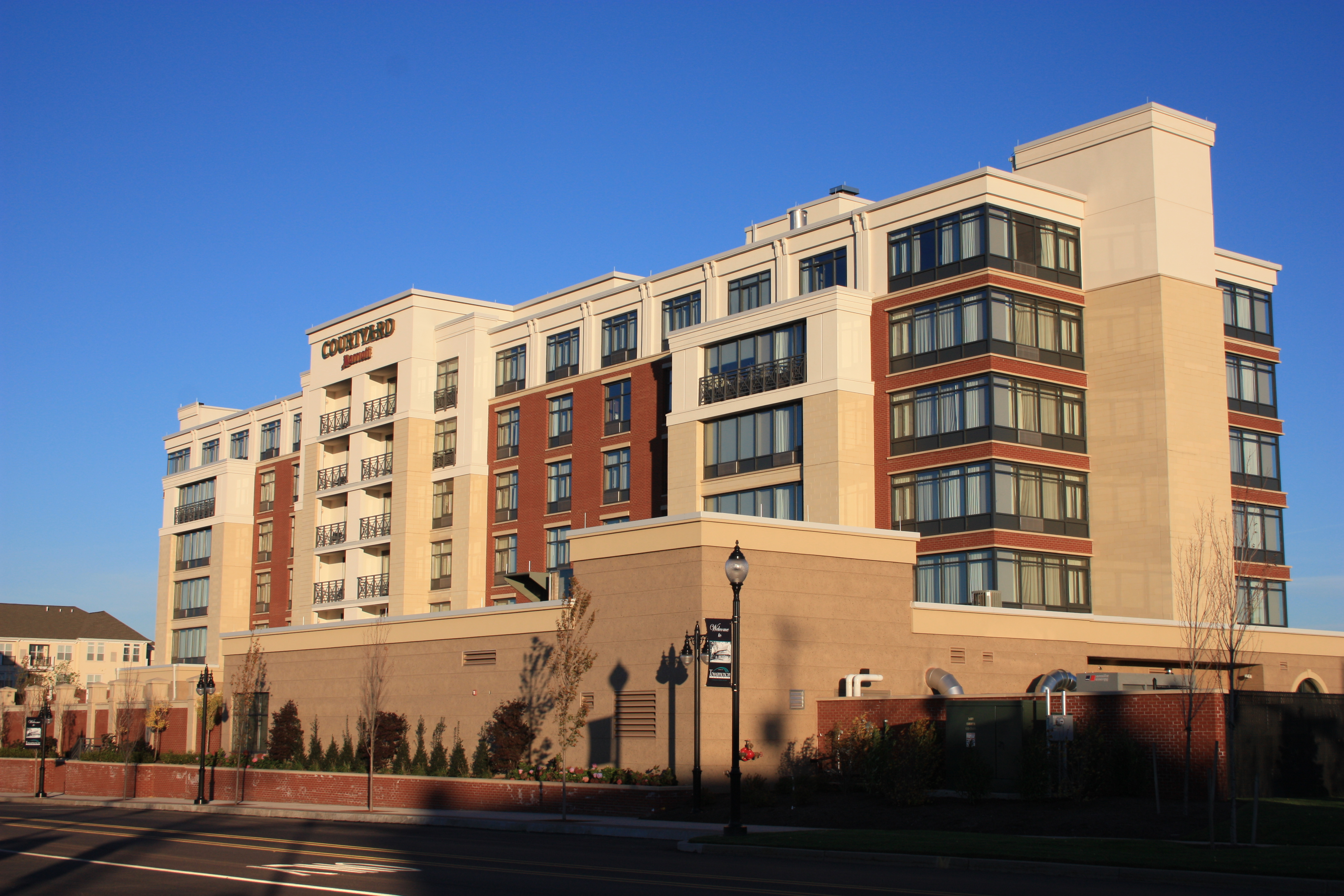
Courtyard by Marriott in Kulpsville, Pennsylvania

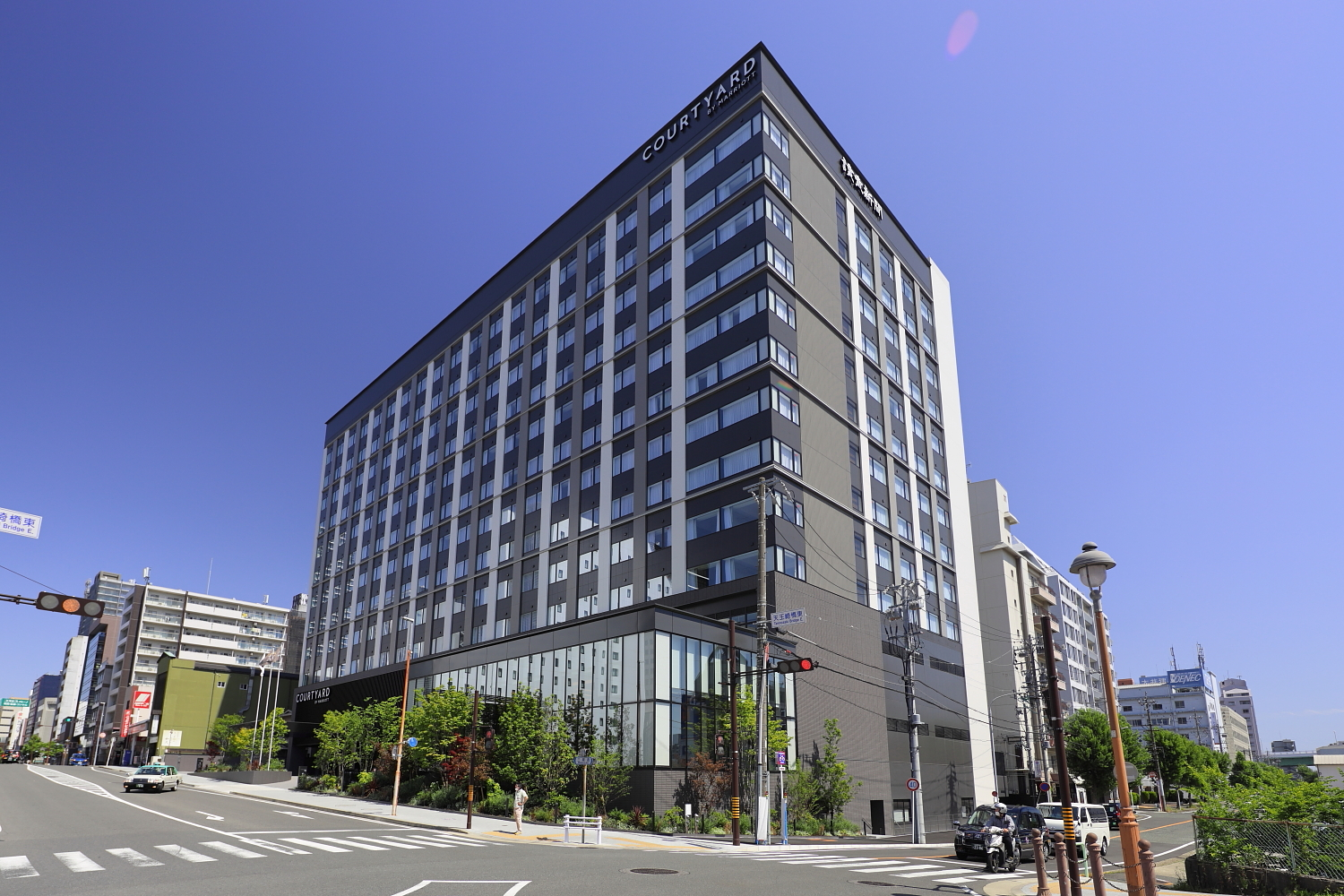
Courtyard by Marriott in Nagoya, Japan

Courtyard by Marriott in Iloilo City, Philippines

=== Historical ===
Year	Type	US	Non-US	Total
2006	Properties			733
2006	Rooms			105,526
2007	Properties	693	74	767
2007	Rooms	96,759	14,021	110,780
2008	Properties	728	80	808
2008	Rooms	101,743	15,515	117,258
2009	Properties	768	90	858
2009	Rooms	107,640	17,566	125,206
2010	Properties	795	97	892
2010	Rooms	111,634	19,435	131,069
2011	Properties	805	108	913
2011	Rooms	113,413	21,306	134,719
2012	Properties	817	112	929
2012	Rooms	114,948	21,605	136,553
2013	Properties	836	117	953
2013	Rooms	117,693	22,856	140,549
2014	Properties	861	127	988
2014	Rooms	120,894	24,906	145,800

=== From 2015 ===
Year	Type	North America	Europe	Middle E. & Africa	Asia & Pacific	Caribbean & Latin Am.	Total
2015	Properties	916	49	5	37	30	1,037
2015	Rooms	129,041	9,220	1,041	9,243	4,872	153,417
2016	Properties	961	54	6	41	36	1,098
2016	Rooms	135,196	10,167	1,279	10,399	6,014	163,055
2017	Properties	994	56	6	48	38	1,142
2017	Rooms	139,326	10,427	1,279	12,076	6,298	169,406
2018	Properties	1,027	63	7	63	39	1,199
2018	Rooms	143,389	11,828	1,487	15,306	6,428	178,438
2019	Properties	1,053	68	7	72	41	1,241
2019	Rooms	146,602	12,892	1,487	16,931	6,717	184,629
2020	Properties	1,058	72	8	79	41	1,258
2020	Rooms	146,913	13,551	1,684	18,454	6,717	187,319
2021	Properties	1,038	76	10	89	43	1,256
2021	Rooms	143,376	14,484	2,162	20,314	7,063	187,399
2022	Properties	1,050	74	10	99	47	1,280
2022	Rooms	145,025	14,003	2,139	22,398	7,612	191,177
2023	Properties	1,066	75	11	113	47	1,312
2023	Rooms	147,091	13,984	2,304	25,972	7,609	196,960
