= Wingate by Wyndham =

Hotel chain run by Wyndham hotels & resorts

Wingate by Wyndham Wingate Inns International Inc.
- Product type: Hotel chain
- Current owner: Wyndham Hotels & Resorts
- Country: United States
- Introduced: 1996
- Website: Official website

Wingate by Wyndham (formerly known as Wingate Inn) is a brand of independently owned hotels that targets business travelers.

== History ==
Wingate opened its first hotel in July 1996. Since then, over 100 new Wingate by Wyndhams have been opened. Wingate by Wyndham is a part of Wyndham Hotels & Resorts, formerly part of Cendant. In late 2007, Wingate Inn officially changed its name to Wingate by Wyndham. As of December 31, 2023, it had 205 properties with 18,652 rooms. It competes with chains like Hilton Garden Inn, Courtyard by Marriott, and Hyatt Place.

== Description ==
The typical Wingate by Wyndham property offers free hot breakfast, free high-speed Internet access, upscale bedding, and workrooms. Most properties have a 24-hour snack bar or mini-mart, but unlike its previously mentioned competitors, it usually does not have full-service restaurants.
