= WorldMark by Wyndham =

Timeshare resort brand

WorldMark by Wyndham logo

WorldMark by Wyndham (formerly Trendwest) is the developer and marketer of WorldMark, The Club, a vacation ownership program. Worldmark by Wyndham is part of the Travel + Leisure Co. family of travel brands (Formerly Wyndham Worldwide and Wyndham Destinations). The original development partner of the club was Trendwest International (TWI), a subsidiary of Jeld-Wen, a door and window manufacturer.

Worldmark by Wyndham (WbW), which does not own WorldMark, the club (WMtC or "the Club"), has a dual role for the club. First, WbW develops new properties for the club and sells vacation credits for these properties at a profit. Additionally, WbW manages existing WMtC resort properties, the funds for which come from annual maintenance dues commensurate with the number of vacation credits each WMtC owner's account contains.

WorldMark by Wyndham operates nearly 100 vacation club properties across the United States, Canada, and Mexico.

== Timeline ==
WorldMark Timeline

- 1989: The club, then known as Club Esprit, is founded by Bill Peare, with TWI as developer.
- 1991: The Club Esprit name is dropped due to a trademark conflict with a similarly named manufacturer of clothing.
- 1993: Club Esprit officially renamed WorldMark, The club.
- 1998: Trendwest is spun off from Jeld-Wen, and Trendwest filed to become a closely held company recognized by the NYSE. At this time Jeld-Wen owned 80% of TrendWest, with the remaining being owned by TrendWest Management.
- May 2002: Cendant Corp. acquires Jeld-Wen’s interest in Trendwest.
- July 2002: By this time all shares in Trendwest had been tendered, and Trendwest became a wholly owned subsidiary of Cendant Corp, and part of the Wyndham Worldwide brand.
- April 2006: Cendant Corp spins off Wyndham Worldwide as a separate entity.
- April 2007: Wyndham Worldwide renames Trendwest (TWI) as WorldMark by Wyndham.

== See also ==
- Wyndham Vacation Resorts, a division of Travel + Leisure Co.
- RCI, another timeshare company that is a division of Travel + Leisure Co.
