= Partsearch Technologies =

Partsearch Technologies Inc.
- Industry: Replacement Parts
- Founded: New York, New York, U.S. (January 1, 2001)
- Founder: Dean Summers; Glenn C. Laumeister
- Headquarters: New York, New York, U.S.
- Area served: USA, Canada
- Key people: Ron Totaro (CEO)
- Products: PartStore.com; PartStorePRO; Partsearch Enterprise; PartStoreCanada.ca
- Website: Partsearch.com

Partsearch Technologies, a Manhattan-based company started in 2001, had compiled an online catalog of more than eight million spare parts for electronics, appliances, and other items. It offers repair technicians and consumers a single place to find obscure parts and commonly lost items such as batteries.

“Partsearch Technologies Inc.” is an organization that specializes in parts management. The company operates the website PartStore.com, providing parts to individual customers, technicians, retailers, and service providers as one stop shop. The Partsearch platform is an outlet for parts and accessories. Since 2001 the company had teamed up with major retailers such as Best Buy, Radio Shack, and Circuit City.

Partsearch Technologies, Inc. operates as a subsidiary of Best Buy Enterprise Services, Inc.

== History ==
Partsearch was founded by Dean Summers in 1998 during the dot-com boom as Ineedapart.com. A 2000 article in Fortune magazine entitled "The Survival of the Fittest" captured Summers' early attempts to get the company funded. In part, the article read: "(FORTUNE Magazine) – A few short months ago, Dean Summers was on a roll. His business plan for Ineedapart.com, which proposed to sell electronic parts over the Web, was hot: Chase Capital Partners wanted to invest $2 million; Idealabs wanted to incubate it; a slew of other investors lined up to meet him. But in mid-April, around the time other e-commerce dot-coms began dropping like flies, Summers' phone stopped ringing. Chase pulled out. Idealabs dropped its offer. Other investors stopped returning his calls. In June, desperate for cash, Summers paid $295 for the privilege of pitching his business plan to a panel of investors at a conference for entrepreneurs. They gave him a few tips on improving his pitch, but no money."

Things changed when Summers received an agreement from Best Buy, the No. 1 consumer electronics retailer in the U.S., to become Ineedapart.com's first customer, conditioned on the new company having to agree to begin accepting phone calls from Best Buy customers in need of parts within the first 30 days of contract signing. Summers used the Best Buy offer as a tool to raise the venture capital needed to hire the staffing and build the infrastructure.

Summers again approached Idealab, the premier "internet incubator" of the time, which agreed to fund the company with $500,000 in a Series A round, in exchange for 20% of the company. Summers agreed to the deal. The new company, Partsearch Technologies, was established in 2001 by Dean Summers and Glenn C. Laumeister, with the mission of "solving the parts problem". The company's initial goal was to serve its customers' direct needs, whether a retailer, a consumer, a service company or a small business. The more immediate goal was to take Best Buy customer calls within 30 days of the Best Buy contract signing, which was consummated immediately following the company's Series A funding.

To get Best Buy's business, they had to meet their March deadline. This required building what was an 8 million SKU database from multiple disaggregated data sources, a shopping cart, and hire and train staff to answer Best Buy's calls. Summers and Laumeister met Kenny Byrne at PC Expo on a Wednesday and by Thursday the new chief architect started building the database and engineering team. Just thirty days later, in nothing short of a herculean effort, Partsearch successfully took the first calls from Best Buy.

In early November 2001, Partsearch publicly announced an alliance with Best Buy. By the end of 2002, in December, Partsearch launched its MPC (Master Parts Catalog) that provides a comprehensive research and procurement solution that will centralize model-specific parts information. Best Buy and Partsearch worked together to aggregate the extensive data. Adding to its list of clients, Partsearch partnered with Brandsmart USA to serve South Florida's discount retailer of consumer electronics, appliances, and housewares.

Early in March 2005, RadioShack signed on with Partsearch to give their customers access to new replacement parts. Within the same year, in November, Partsearch brought on its 16th client, RC Willey, a furnishings retailer west of Mississippi.

In late 2005, after signing nearly every major consumer electronics retailer, founder Summers believed the company was hitting a ceiling and should diversify its portfolio of offerings to achieve further growth. The board of directors sided with Laumeister to stay focused on the core business. As a result, Dean Summers stepped down from his role as Partsearch president to pursue other entrepreneurial interests. He subsequently sold the majority of his company shares in 2006.

In April 2006, Partsearch announced their partnership with Crutchfield to co-brand Crutchfield Partsearch. According to Rick Souder, executive vice president and chief operating officer of Crutchfield, Partsearch, in particular has made it easier for consumers to find spare parts. Late in 2006, Partsearch signed Circuit City as another client. At that point, Partsearch could offer over 7 million parts to Circuit City Customers.

In April 2007, Partsearch signed a deal with the National Service Alliance to create a single source to access and order service parts for its service providers around the country.

By 2007, Glenn Laumeister was named Ernst & Young Entrepreneur of the Year for the Metro New York Area. The awards program was designed to recognize outstanding entrepreneurs on a regional, national and global level who are building and leading dynamic, growing businesses. Later in 2007, Partsearch was given the title of No. 93 on Entrepreneur magazine's 2007 Hot 500 Company Rankings. To top the year off, Partsearch also made the INC.’s 5000 – 2007 Fastest Growing Private Companies in America. In August 2007, Partsearch named Gary Kazmer President. As the company grew, it achieved profitability in 2009. By July 2009, Partsearch reached a new benchmark in sales – the sale of the five-millionth part. During this same year, PartStore.com also jumped 51 places from No. 401 to No. 350 on the Internet Retailers Top 500 List and again to No. 273 in 2010.

In 2009, Glenn Laumeister left the role of CEO and became vice chairman of the board. As a board member, he assisted with the transition and search for a new CEO. In March 2010, Partsearch named its new CEO, Ron Totaro. Totaro brought more than 20 years of experience to his new role as CEO of Partsearch Technologies. He has served in a range of general management, operations, sales and marketing positions. Most recently, Totaro was the chief operating officer of ACI Worldwide, the world leader in electronic payment software, where he was responsible for all aspects of the global P&L.

Toward the end of 2010, Best Buy and Partsearch got into a contract dispute related to rebates, as Best Buy was trying to claim that they were entitled to receive additional rebates that were not part of the original Best Buy contract. Eventually Best Buy stopped paying Partsearch when Partsearch refused to agree to their demands. Having lost its largest customer, Partsearch filed for bankruptcy in January, 2011 At the bankruptcy auction, Best Buy acquired Partsearch for $6.1 million. Best Buy today continues to operate PartStore.com and utilize Partsearch's B2B services internally for their service and parts operations.

== Call Center ==
Opened in 2003, Partsearch also maintained a New York–based call center in upstate New York in Kingston. The company investigated India but elected to put the center closer to its Manhattan headquarters and in a city where it became a major source of employment. Previously called "Partsolvers", the Partsearch CSRs (callcenter service representatives) provided each of Partsearch's clients world-class service and parts expertise. This Call Center closed in 2011.

== Technology ==
Partsearch does not actually keep spare parts in a warehouse. Rather, it provides inventory information from suppliers and manufacturers in various industries. The parts are then drop shipped to the customers.

== E-Commerce ==
Partsearch Technologies' e-commerce platforms included: PartStore, PartstorePro and Partsearch Enterprise

=== PartStore ===
The PartStore website was launched in 2003 to serve consumers directly. It was Partsearch's main e-commerce website. PartStore was No. 286 on the Internet Top 500 List. The PartStore.com website served as Partsearch's outlet to serve individual customers as well as small business owners.

=== PartStorePRO and Enterprise ===
PartStorePro.com is a service provided by Partsearch which is geared towards smaller businesses and service technicians. The PartStorePRO website offers an on-account ordering availability and special rebates. PartstorePRO supports tax exempt institutions with their parts and accessories needs and has the ability to bill based on state-specific exemption status. Partsearch Enterprise caters to large service providers and third party warranty administrators.
