= Chartwell Leisure =

American hotel company

Chartwell Leisure was an American hotel company. It was formed in 1994 as National Gaming, a spin-off of the gaming businesses of Hospitality Franchise Systems (HFS). A year later, after finding little success, the company said it was leaving the casino industry, and would seek to acquire a business in a less risky field.

In January 1996, the company changed its name to National Lodging, and paid $98 million to buy 16 Travelodge hotels and joint venture interests in 96 more from Forte, as part of a deal that also saw HFS acquire the Travelodge trademark and franchise operation. In August, the company was renamed Chartwell Leisure after taking a $57 million investment from groups affiliated with the Fisher family, the Gordon Getty family, and the de Gunzburg family, giving them a total 52 percent stake in the firm.

In March 1998, the company was acquired by a partnership of Whitehall Street Real Estate (a Goldman Sachs affiliate) and Westmont Hospitality Group for $349 million, including $77 million in assumed debt. Westmont received a minority share, and took over operations of the company's 124 properties, under the new name WW Leisure.
