= Tides to Pines =

Maine hospitality company

Tides to Pines is an American vacation rental and property management company. Based in Rockland, Maine, Tides to Pines oversees about 475 curated homes across the state, making it the largest vacation rental management company in Maine.

Most of the Tides to Pines homes are along the Maine coast, in addition to the Moosehead Lake region. The company also offers concierge services to guests.

== History ==
Tides to Pines was founded in December 2023. It was co-founded by Molly Hooper and Paige Teel, who are Maine natives and previously worked for other real estate and property management companies.

In the fall of 2024, Tides to Pines represented 80 homes. As of 2026, the company manages a collection of about 475 properties, employing more than 70 full-time and part-time workers. All of the homes are carefully inspected and required to meet state and local safety codes.

== Leadership ==
Hooper is the owner and chief executive officer of Tides to Pines. Teel is the company's co-owner and chief experience officer.
