= Cendant =

American conglomerate (1997–2006)

Cendant Corporation
- Formerly: Hospitality Franchise Systems
- Type: Public
- Traded as: NYSE: CD
- Industry: Business and consumer services
- Founded: December 18, 1997; 28 years ago (as Cendant Corporation)
- Defunct: 2006
- Fate: Renamed as Avis Budget Group after divestiture of real estate, travel and hotel divisions
- Successor: Avis Budget Group (vehicle rental operations); Travelport (travel operations); Realogy (real estate operations); Wyndham Worldwide (hospitality operations)
- Headquarters: New York City, United States
- Key people: Henry R. Silverman (CEO)
- Website: cendant.com

Cendant Corporation was an American provider of business and consumer services, primarily within the real estate and travel industries. In 2005 and 2006, it broke up and spun off or sold its constituent businesses. Although it was based in New York City, the majority of its headquarters employees were in Parsippany-Troy Hills, New Jersey.

Its last CEO was Henry Silverman.

== History ==
=== Founding ===
Hospitality Franchise Systems Inc. (HFS) was created as an affiliate of the Blackstone Group, a private equity firm, as a vehicle to acquire hotel franchises. It was led by Henry Silverman, a Blackstone partner and former CEO of Days Inn. It began in 1990 by buying Howard Johnson's and the U.S. rights to the Ramada brand from Prime Motor Inns for $170 million. In 1992, HFS bought the Days Inn franchise out of bankruptcy for $290 million. This purchase made HFS the largest hotel franchisor in the world, with its brands licensed to 2,300 hotels.

Blackstone took Hospitality Franchise Systems public in a December 1992 IPO. HFS was among the fastest growing companies of its size in the 1990s and the company's stock rose from its IPO price of $4 per share to $77 per share in 1998.

In 1993, HFS purchased the Super 8 brand, franchised to 1,000 motels, for $125 million, and bought the 61-hotel Park Inn brand. The company made a brief foray into the casino industry, but then spun off that business in November 1994 as National Gaming. In 1995, HFS launched a new hotel brand, Wingate Inn.

After company management found that they had mostly exhausted the field of desirable acquisition targets in the hotel industry, Hospitality Franchise Systems expanded into the real estate business. Silverman hoped that HFS's skills at franchise management would bring success in fields outside of hospitality. In August 1995, it acquired Century 21, a franchised chain of brokerages, from MetLife for $200 million. The company changed its name to HFS Inc. the same month, to reflect its broadened scope. This was followed the next year with the acquisition of Electronic Realty Associates for $37 million, and Coldwell Banker for $740 million, making HFS the largest franchisor of real estate brokerages in the U.S.

In 1996, HFS acquired the Avis car rental company for $793 million. In keeping with HFS's strategy of being primarily a franchisor, it kept ownership of the Avis brand name and reservations system, while selling off the operations of Avis's corporate-owned locations as a new company, Avis Rent a Car, Inc. HFS also bought Resort Condominiums International, a timeshare exchange service, for up to $825 million.

In 1997, HFS acquired PHH Corp. for $1.8 billion. PHH's businesses of mortgage brokerage, relocation services, and fleet management were expected to synergize with HFS's real estate and car rental businesses.

However, later that year, Silverman led HFS into what would prove a disastrous merger with CUC International, a direct marketing company that operated discount membership programs like Shoppers Advantage and Travelers Advantage. HFS and CUC combined in a "merger of equals" on December 18, 1997, to form Cendant Corporation. As part of the merger, Silverman announced he would reduce his day-to-day involvement with the company and assume the company's chairmanship in preference of CUC's founder and CEO Walter Forbes.

In January 1998, Cendant purchased Jackson Hewitt, a franchised chain of tax preparation offices, for $480 million.

=== Accounting scandal ===
Just months after the merger, in April 1998 Cendant uncovered massive accounting improprieties at CUC which resulted in one of the largest financial scandals of the 1990s. At the time, Vice Chairman E. Kirk Shelton was reported to have inflated the company's revenue by $500 million over a period of three years. He had reported a 1997 net income of $55.4 million when the true 1997 result was a net loss of $217.2 million. As these irregularities in the books of Cendant were discovered in early 1998, an audit committee set up by Cendant's Board of Directors launched an investigation and discovered that the former management team of CUC, including its top executive Kirk Shelton, had been fraudulently preparing false business statements for several years. When this report was released to the public, the resulting damage to the market value for the company was approximately $14 billion, with their stock tumbling from a high of $41 down to nearly $12. At the time, this fiasco was the largest case of accounting fraud in the country's history. After the accounting scandal was uncovered, Silverman and the Cendant board forced Forbes’ resignation and Silverman assumed the CEO post.

In March 2001, Shelton was indicted by a federal grand jury and sued by the Securities and Exchange Commission, which accused the company of directing the massive accounting fraud that ultimately cost the company and its investors billions of dollars. Shelton served 8 of his 10-year prison sentence before being released early for exemplary behavior.

Under Silverman, Cendant bounced back from the accounting scandal far outperforming the markets in the early 2000s.

=== Post-scandal ===
Following the fraud debacle, Cendant began selling businesses to reduce its debt and repair the financial damage caused by the accounting scandal. In 1998 the company sold Hebdo Mag, a publisher of classified advertising publications, for $450 million to a management buyout group. In 1999 it sold its consumer software division, Cendant Software (consisting of Blizzard Entertainment, Davidson & Associates, Knowledge Adventure, and Sierra On-Line), to French publisher Havas for $770 million.

By 2001, Cendant was again in acquisition mode. It re-acquired the operations of Avis Rent a Car for $937 million. It made moves towards building a major online travel portal by acquiring Galileo International for $2.9 billion, and Cheap Tickets for $425 million. It entered the timeshare sales and management business by buying Fairfield Communities for $690 million, and Trendwest Resorts for $980 million. In 2002, Cendant bought Budget Rent a Car out of bankruptcy for $110 million plus $2.8 billion in assumed debt. The combination of Budget with Avis made Cendant the second-largest car rental company in the U.S.

In 2004, Cendant began a series of moves to simplify its business and focus on its core areas of real estate and travel.

As part of this strategy, several non-core businesses were sold or spun off. In June 2004, Cendant sold Jackson Hewitt for $638 million through an initial public offering. In January 2005, Cendant spun off its mortgage and fleet management businesses as PHH Corporation. The next month, Cendant sold its Wright Express division, a provider of fleet cards, for $1.03 billion through an initial public offering. In October 2005, Cendant sold its marketing services division, including its membership shopping programs, to Affinion Group, a vehicle of Apollo Management, for $1.8 billion.

Meanwhile, proceeds from these sales were used for acquisitions to expand Cendant's core businesses. In November 2004, Cendant purchased Orbitz, the third-largest travel booking site in the U.S., for $1.2 billion. In December 2004, Cendant consolidated its control of the Ramada name by buying out Marriott International's stake in the hotel brand. In February 2005, Cendant acquired Ebookers, the second-largest travel booking site in Europe, for $350 million. In April 2005, Cendant acquired Gullivers Travel Associates, a British seller of travel packages and wholesale hotel nights, for $1.1 billion. In October 2005, the company bought the Wyndham hotel brand from Blackstone for $111 million.

=== Breakup ===
On October 23, 2005, Cendant's strategy of simplification culminated in the announcement that it would split into four separate companies, focused respectively on hotels, real estate, travel services, and rental cars. Silverman said the breakup would improve shareholder value by allowing the market to better recognize the value of Cendant's component businesses.

Cendant originally planned to spin off its travel services division to shareholders as a company named Travelport, but on June 30, 2006, Cendant announced it would sell Travelport to Blackstone for $4.3 billion.

On July 31, 2006, Cendant's real estate and hotel divisions were spun off and became separate companies under the names Realogy and Wyndham Worldwide, respectively.

The sale of Travelport to Blackstone was completed on August 23, 2006. This left Cendant with only its car rental business, comprising Avis, Budget Rent a Car, and Budget Truck Rental. The company retired the Cendant name and renamed itself to Avis Budget Group on September 1, 2006.

== Former brands ==
=== Automobile rentals ===
Cendant owned the rental brands of Avis and Budget, holding these properties in the CCRG (Cendant Car Rental Group). Avis and Budget operate a shared fleet of cars, and have the same "back end" system, but operate at different locations, offer different service levels, and have somewhat different pricing. After the Cendant name was dissolved, the car rental segment became known as Avis Budget Group and currently trades on the NASDAQ stock exchange under the ticker symbol CAR.

=== Hotel franchises ===
These brands were spun off into Wyndham Worldwide.

- AmeriHost Inn
- Baymont Inn & Suites
- Days Inn
- Days Inn China
- Hawthorn Suites by Wyndham
- Howard Johnson
- Knights Inn (includes Villager Inn, which was merged into Knights Inn in 2004)
- Ramada
- Ramada Asia-Pacific
- Super 8 Worldwide
- Travelodge
- Wingate Inn
- Wyndham Hotels & Resorts

=== Real estate franchises ===
These companies are now under the Realogy banner.

- Century 21 Real Estate
- Citi-Habitats
- Coldwell Banker
- Corcoran Group
- ERA Real Estate
- NRT
- Sotheby's International Realty

=== Membership programs ===
These companies are now under the Affinion Group banner.

- CUC International (Comp-U-Card)
- Shopper's Advantage
- AutoVantage
- Traveler's Advantage
- Buyer's Advantage
- NetMarket
- PrivacyGuard

=== Travel services ===
These brands were separated into a new company called Travelport.

- CheapTickets
- TripRewards
- HotelClub.com
- AoYou.com
- RatesToGo.com
- Galileo CRS
- Orbitz
- ebookers
- Lodging.com
- Asia-hotels.com
- Away.com
- travelbag.co.uk
- OctopusTravel.com
- Travelport.com
- Gta-travel.com (Gullivers Travel Associates)
- Trust International

=== Timeshare companies ===
These companies are owned by Wyndham Worldwide.

- Fairfield Resorts
- Trendwest Resorts
- Shell Vacation Club

=== Vacation network groups ===
- RCI
- Cuendet
- Landal GreenParks
- French Life
- Novasol

== See also ==
- Lightfoot v. Cendant Mortgage Corp.
