= Chartwell Technology =

Canadian gaming software developer

- Company type: Public
- Industry: Online Casino Software
- Headquarters: Calgary, Alberta, Canada
- Number of employees: 100

Chartwell Technology was a gaming software developer focused largely on the online casino market. The company was based in Calgary.

== History ==
Chartwell Technology was originally founded in British Columbia on 16 December 1987 as Napier Explorations Inc., a mineral exploration company with interests in mineral exploration in British Columbia. In 1989, the name changed to Brockton Resources Inc. In 1992, the company stopped its mineral activities and moved to oil and gas, changing its name to Chartwell Ventures Ltd.

In 1998, after acquiring Gateway Technology, a software developer, the company completely changed its business module by shifting to software developing and licensing. Few months later, on 8 December 1998, the name was eventually changed to Chartwell Technology Inc. In 2005, Chartwell acquired MicroPower, an online poker software developer.

The company developed a wide range of online casino games including slot games, table games and fixed odds games, mini games, and networked multiplayer baccarat and blackjack.

Chartwell Technology had over 130 employees in three countries, Canada, the United Kingdom, and Malta.

Chartwell provided gaming software to notable companies and websites to power their online games, such as Betfair, Bwin, Casinos Austria, Bet365, and 888casino. It also partnered with many gaming software developers, such as Macau-based Entertasia and UK-based HoGaming.

Previously traded on the Alberta Stock Exchange and the TSX Venture Exchange, in 2004, Chartwell Technology was listed on the Toronto Stock Exchange under the trading symbol TSX:CWH, and delisted in May 2011 after Amaya's acquisition.

== Acquisition ==
In July 2011, Chartwell Technology was sold to The Stars Group (then Amaya Gaming Group) in a $23 million deal. As a result, it became a wholly owned subsidiary of Amaya Gaming Group Inc., and its name was changed to Amaya Alberta Inc. In 2015, Amaya sold the company—along with other subsidiaries, to Las Vegas-based NYX Gaming Group, which in turn was acquired a few years later by Scientific Games.
