= Ramada Asia-Pacific =

Regional arm of the Ramada International hotel chain

Ramada Asia-Pacific is the regional arm of the Ramada International hotel chain operated by the Wyndham Hotel Group. The Wyndham Hotel Group franchises hotels and provides property management services around the globe.

The Ramada Asia-Pacific network began with one hotel in Guangzhou, China, in 1991, the Ramada Pearl Guangzhou. Since then, it has grown to include 79 Hotels located across 12 countries in the region. Several new properties are planned for the Asia-Pacific region within the next few years.

== Properties in Asia-Pacific ==
Ramada hotels in Asia Pacific are individually owned and are positioned to appeal to mid-market leisure and business travelers. They are full-service hotels with onsite food and beverage outlets, business facilities, and fitness facilities.

Ramada Asia-Pacific properties in the region include:

Australia

- Ramada Encore Melbourne, Dandenong
- Ramada Hotel and Suites Ballina
- Ramada Hervey Bay

China

- Ramada Parkside Beijing
- Ramada Plaza Changchun
- Ramada Parkview Changzhou
- Ramada Plaza Chongqing West
- Ramada Plaza Dalian
- Ramada Dongguan
- Ramada Fuzhou
- Ramada Pearl Guangzhou
- Ramada Plaza Guangzhou
- Ramada Plaza Guiyang
- Ramada Hotel Hangzhou
- Ramada Plaza Hangzhou
- Ramada Huangshan Hotel
- Ramada Kunshan
- Ramada Meizhou
- Ramada Plaza Nanjing
- Ramada Shanghai Caohejing
- Ramada Plaza Gateway Shanghai
- Ramada Plaza Peace Shanghai Luwan
- Ramada Plaza Shanghai, Pudong
- Ramada Pudong Airport
- Ramada Plaza Sino-Bay Shanghai
- Ramada Hotel Shanghai Wujiaochang
- Ramada Shanghai Zhabei
- Ramada Plaza Pudong South Shanghai
- Ramada Pudong Shanghai Expo
- Ramada Shunde
- Ramada Plaza Taian
- Ramada Ürümqi
- Ramada Plaza Optics Valley Wuhan
- Ramada Plaza Tianlu Wuhan
- Ramada Wuxi
- Ramada Encore Wuxi
- Ramada Plaza Wuxi
- Ramada Xiamen
- Ramada Plaza Yantai
- Ramada Plaza Yiwu
- Ramada Plaza Zhengzhou
- Ramada Zibo

Guam

- Ramada Hotel & Suites Tamuning

Hong Kong

- Ramada Kowloon
- Ramada Hong Kong

India

- Ramada Plaza Agra
- Ramada Plaza Aligarh
- Ramada Chennai Egmore
- Ramada Plaza Chennai Guindy
- Ramada Caravela Beach Resort Goa
- Ramada Plaza Palm Grove
- Ramada Plaza JHV Varanasi
- Ramada Khajuraho
- Ramada Powai
- Ramada Resort Cochin
- Ramada Jaipur
- Ramada Jammu
- Ramada Jamshedpur
- Ramada Gurgaon BMK
- Ramada Gurgaon Central
- Ramada Bangalore
- Ramada Ahmedabad
- Ramada Encore Bangalore Domlur
- Ramada Alleppey Kerala
- Ramada Amritsar
- Ramada Navi Mumbai
- Ramada Udaipur Resort and Spa

Indonesia

- Ramada Resort Bintang Bali
- Ramada Resort Benoa Bali
- Ramada Resort Camakila, Legian, Bali

Japan

- Ramada Osaka
- Ramada Sapporo

Korea

- Ramada Plaza Gwangju
- Ramada Dongtan
- Ramada Plaza Suwon
- Ramada Hotel & Suites Seoul Central
- Ramada Seoul
- Ramada Songdo
- Ramada Plaza Jeju
- Ramada Encore Pohang
- Ramada Plaza Cheongju

Malaysia

- Ramada Plaza Melaka

New Caledonia

- Ramada Plaza Nouméa

Pakistan

- Ramada Multan
- Ramada Plaza Karachi International Airport
- Ramada Islamabad

Sri Lanka

- Ramada Resort Kalutara
- Ramada Katunayaka - Colombo International Airport
- Ramada Colombo

Thailand

- Ramada Resort Khao Lak
- Ramada D'MA Bangkok
- Ramada Plaza Menam Riverside Bangkok
- Ramada Hotel & Suites Bangkok

== Planned future developments ==
=== Singapore ===
The Wyndham Hotel Group recently announced plans to enter the Singapore hotel and lodging market with a new property expected to open in 2014, the 391-room Ramada Singapore, to be located in the Balestier Park area.

The 17-story Ramada Singapore at Zhongshan Park will include a full-service restaurant, fitness center, swimming pool, business center and more than 600 square-meters of meeting space.

This will be the first Ramada International property in Singapore.

=== China ===
In February 2010, the Wyndham Hotel Group announced its expansion in China with the development of an additional four hotels in China, bringing the total number of Ramada properties there to 39.

These four properties are the Ramada Sanya hotel, the Ramada Plaza Wenzhou, the Ramada Longyan hotel, and the Ramada Xi'an Bell Tower hotel. All four are currently under development and will be full-service hotels featuring business and conference facilities, onsite food and beverage outlets, as well as fitness facilities.

=== India ===
The group also plans to expand its presence in India with four additional properties in the country, for a total of 14 properties in India.

These are the 140-room Ramada Amritsar hotel, the 130-room Ramada Gurgaon Expressway New Delhi hotel, the 392-room Ramada Plaza Dwarka New Delhi hotel, and the 100-room Ramada Gurgaon Central hotel.

=== Thailand ===
The group signed its first management agreements in Bangkok, Thailand at the end of 2009. New properties now under development include the 188-room Ramada Encore Soi 10 – Bangkok, the 98-room Ramada Hotel & Suites Soi 12 – Bangkok, and the 150-room Ramada Bangkok Sukhumvit. The new properties bring the number of Ramada hotels in Thailand to six in total.
