= Gryphon Software =

American software publisher

- Industry: Software
- Founded: 1991; 35 years ago San Diego, California, U.S.
- Area served: Worldwide

Gryphon Software Corporation was a software publisher founded in 1991 that specializing in a broad range of graphics-oriented software. The company had two product lines: one focused on graphics for video professionals, graphic designers and hobbyists; and the other focused on children's software with a strong graphic orientation. Its best-known program was Morph.

One of the first software programs to bring Hollywood special effects to the personal computer, Morph enabled users to transform still images and videos into another. Video professionals used Morph in a variety of ads, television commercials, music videos and film productions such as Francis Ford Coppola's Bram Stoker's Dracula, Robin Hood: Men in Tights and Dragon: The Bruce Lee Story. Time magazine used the software to illustrate one article and to make two front covers.

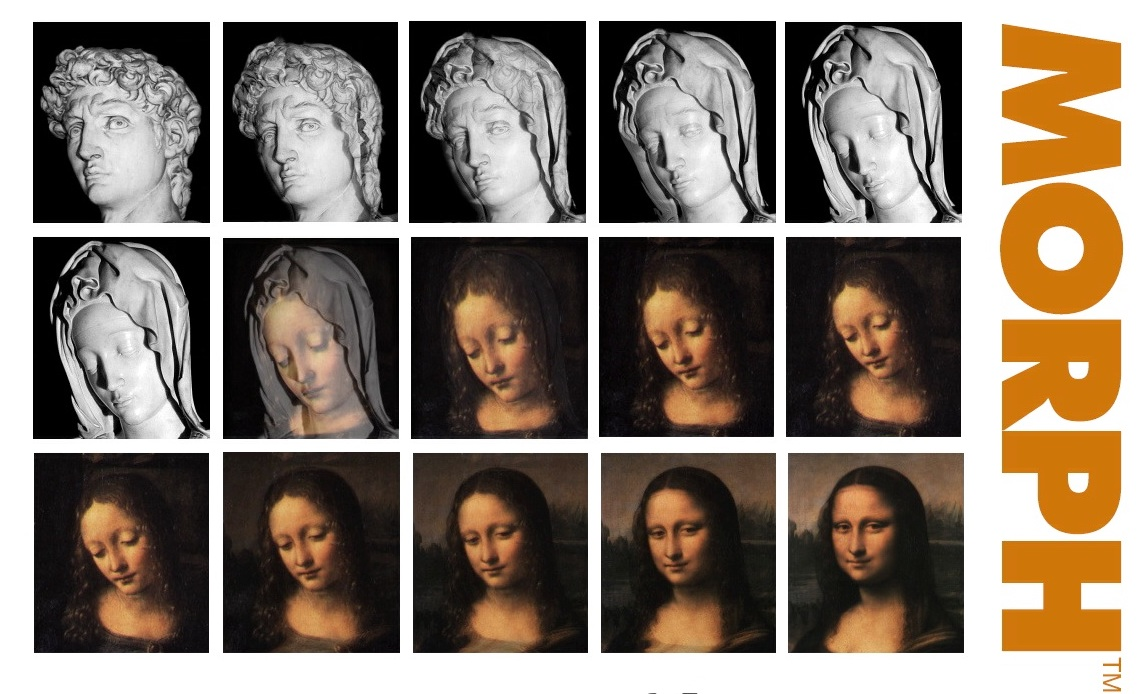
Morph sequence

In mid-1997, Gryphon Software was acquired by CUC International (later renamed Cendant Software) and its products were sold under the brands Knowledge Adventure and Sierra Home.
