= Walter Forbes =

American businessman and fraudster

- Born: 1942/43
- Education: Harvard Business School, Northwestern University and The Hill School
- Known for: CEO of CUC International and Cendant Corporation

Walter Forbes (born 1942/43) is an American corporate executive best known for his role as CEO of CUC International and his involvement in one of the largest corporate scandals of the 1990s.

Walter Forbes was the CEO of CUC International from 1981-1997. CUC was a membership-based consumer services conglomerate with travel, shopping, auto, dining, home improvement and financial services. Under Forbes' leadership, CUC was considered an e-commerce pioneer.

As early as 1981, Forbes envisioned CUC (formerly Comp-U-Card) as an electronic shopping service that would leverage home computers for members to shop conveniently. However, with home computers still a decade away from widespread adoption, the company pivoted to direct-to-consumer home shopping clubs, where customers placed orders by phone, and manufacturers shipped products directly to their homes at wholesale prices. Customers paid an annual membership fee for access to these discounts. By the early 1990s, Forbes had built CUC into a $2 billion direct-marketing company with more than 50 million members buying from a database of more than 250,000 products.

In 1994, Forbes increased the company's investment in online shopping, particularly on America Online, purchasing NetMarket, and developing a website, Shoppers Advantage, which was launched in the fall of 1995. CUC's presence online generated $400 million in product sales in 1996. At the time, no other company was selling as much merchandise online.

Forbes' tenure as CEO ended in 1997 when CUC merged with HFS Inc. to form Cendant Corporation. After the merger, in April 1998, Cendant uncovered accounting improprieties at CUC which resulted in one of the largest financial scandals of the 1990s.

Forbes was prosecuted by the U.S. Attorney's Office for the District of New Jersey. After two mistrials where jurors deadlocked, he was convicted in a third trial of one count of conspiracy to commit securities fraud, and two counts of making false statements, for inflating reported incomes for the Cendant Corporation, when he was Chief Executive Officer of that company in the 1990s, and at its predecessor company CUC International.

On January 17, 2007, the 64-year-old Forbes was sentenced to over 12 years in prison, and ordered to make restitution amounting to $3.28 billion. Former vice chairman E. Kirk Shelton was ordered to pay the same figure. Forbes was released from prison on July 20, 2018.

One Department of Justice website describes this as the largest restitution order ever imposed as of July 2007. It has since been overtaken by the $170 billion restitution order against Bernard Madoff in June 2009.

Walter Forbes has no relation to the Boston Forbes family or the family that owns and publishes Forbes magazine.

Forbes has bachelor's and master's degrees in journalism from Northwestern University and an MBA from Harvard Business School.
