= Travel + Leisure Co. =

American timeshare and former hotel company

- Formerly: Wyndham Worldwide (2006–2018); Wyndham Destinations (2018-2021)
- Type: Public
- Traded as: NYSE: TNL; S&P 400 component
- Industry: Hospitality
- Predecessor: Cendant (hospitality operations)
- Founded: July 8, 2006; 20 years ago
- Headquarters: Orlando, Florida, United States
- Key people: Michael D. Brown (president & CEO); Michael Hug (CFO)
- Products: Timeshare, vacation rentals, resorts
- Revenue: ▲US$3.864 billion (2024)
- Operating income: ▲US$733 million (2024)
- Net income: ▲US$411 million (2024)
- Number of employees: 19,000 (2024)
- Divisions: Vacation Ownership, Travel & Membership
- Subsidiaries: RCI; WorldMark by Wyndham
- Website: travelandleisureco.com

Travel + Leisure Co. (formerly Wyndham Destinations, Inc., and Wyndham Worldwide Corporation) is an American timeshare company headquartered in Orlando, Florida. It develops, sells, and manages timeshare properties under several vacation ownership clubs, including Club Wyndham, WorldMark by Wyndham, Margaritaville Vacation Club, and Accor Vacation Club. The company provides timeshare exchange services, primarily through RCI, and travel clubs including Travel + Leisure GO.

The company operates two business lines: Vacation Ownership and Travel & Membership.

Wyndham Worldwide was formed as a spin-off from Cendant Corporation in 2006, with ownership of Cendant's hotel and timeshare businesses. In 2018, Wyndham Worldwide spun off its hotel division as Wyndham Hotels & Resorts and changed its own name to Wyndham Destinations and then to Travel + Leisure in 2021 following the acquisition of the brand from Meredith Corporation, later known as People Inc.. The Travel + Leisure magazine is published independently by People under a long-term license agreement.

== History ==
The company's origins can be traced to the founding of Hospitality Franchise Systems (HFS) in 1990, created as a vehicle to acquire hotel franchises. By 1995, it had acquired the Days Inn, Howard Johnson, Ramada, and Super 8 brands. HFS then expanded into other businesses. In 1996, it acquired the timeshare exchange service Resort Condominiums International. In 1997, HFS merged with CUC International to form Cendant Corporation. Cendant increased its involvement in the timeshare business by buying Fairfield Communities in 2001 and Trendwest Resorts in 2002. In 2005, Cendant bought the Wyndham hotel brand from the Blackstone Group.

On July 31, 2006, Wyndham Worldwide was created as a spin-off from Cendant with ownership of its hotel and timeshare businesses, as part of a plan to break Cendant up into four separate companies.

In 2013, Wyndham acquired Shell Vacations Club for $102 million plus $153 million of assumed debt.

In August 2017, Wyndham announced plans to spin off its hotel division to shareholders as a separate publicly traded company, thereby becoming a pure timeshare company. The spin-off of Wyndham Hotels & Resorts occurred on May 31, 2018, and what remained of Wyndham Worldwide was renamed as Wyndham Destinations the same day.

In 2026, Newsweek listed Travel + Leisure Co. as one of America's Most Charitable Companies.

== Vacation Ownership ==
Travel + Leisure Co., headquartered in Orlando, Florida, is the largest vacation ownership company in the world by number of owners and resorts. It includes a network of more than 270 properties, 25,000 individual units, and over 800,000 property owners. Locations are in North America, the Caribbean, and the South Pacific. The company's Vacation Ownership business line includes marketing and sales of vacation ownership interests, consumer financing in conjunction with the purchase of vacation ownership interests, property management services to property owners' associations, and development and acquisition of vacation ownership resorts.

=== Travel + Leisure vacation ownership brands ===
- Club Wyndham
- Club Wyndham Asia
- Margaritaville Vacation Club
- Accor Vacation Club
- Presidential Reserve by Wyndham
- Shell Vacations Club
- WorldMark by Wyndham
- Club Wyndham South Pacific (formerly Wyndham Vacation Resorts Asia Pacific)

== Travel & Membership ==
The company's Travel & Membership business line was formed to manage the company's timeshare exchange and membership travel and technology businesses, including RCI. This division operates the businesses formerly part of Wyndham Destination Network. Wyndham Exchange and Rentals officially changed its name to Wyndham Destination Network on January 1, 2016, and formerly operated over 110,000 vacation properties worldwide in more than 100 countries. To help diversify from its traditional exchange business, the company bought Love Home Swap in 2017. On May 9, 2018, Wyndham Worldwide Corporation completed an agreement to sell its European vacation rental business, which included cottages.com, Hoseasons, James Villa Holidays, Landal GreenParks, Novasol, and several others to Platinum Equity for around $1.3 billion Wyndham Destinations sold its North American Vacation Rental business and associated brands to Vacasa in July 2019 and purchased Alliance Reservations Network in August 2019 for $92 million.

=== Travel & Membership brands ===
- RCI
- 7Across (formerly DAE previously Dial An Exchange)
- The Registry Collection
- Travel + Leisure GO
- Heroes Vacation Club
- Armed Forces Vacation Club
- Playbook365
- @Work International
- Alliance Reservations Network

== Sales practices ==
Wyndham Vacation Resorts was the focus of investigations regarding their sales practices in 2016 in Pennsylvania and Wisconsin. The Real Estate Commission for Pennsylvania fined Wyndham and their broker at their Shawnee-on-Delaware location, Craig Roberts, a total of $15,000. Eight months earlier, Wyndham settled similar allegations in Wisconsin, paying $655,000 in restitution to 29 consumers.

Also in 2016, a San Francisco jury awarded $20 million to Trish Williams, a former Wyndham timeshare sales representative, who was wrongfully terminated in 2010 for reporting timeshare fraud on the elderly.
