= Six Million Crucifixions =

2010 book by Gabriel Wilensky

- Author: Gabriel Wilensky
- Language: English
- Subject: History, Holocaust, antisemitism
- Publisher: QWERTY Publishers (1st edition, hardcover)
- Publication date: April 11, 2010 (1st edition, hardcover)
- Publication place: United States
- Pages: 390 pages (1st edition, hardcover)
- ISBN: 978-0984334643 (hardcover)

Six Million Crucifixions: How Christian Teachings About Jews Paved the Road to the Holocaust is a 2010 history book by author Gabriel Wilensky. The book examines the role Christian teachings about Jews played in enabling the racial eliminationist antisemitism that gave rise to the Holocaust. In Six Million Crucifixions Wilensky argues that from the earliest days of the Christian movement an attitude of contempt toward Jews and Judaism emerged, which over time evolved into full-blown hatred. Wilensky argues that it was this foundation that made the various peoples of Europe ultimately receptive to the genocidal message of the Nazis, and made large numbers of them willing collaborators in the extermination of two thirds of European Jewry in what is known as the Holocaust.

The book concludes by arguing that following the Allied victory in the Second World War, the Allies should have tried any members of the Christian clergy who may have been complicit in the crimes of the Third Reich and its allies before, during and after the war.

== Overview ==
Six Million Crucifixions has a foreword by Holocaust scholar John K. Roth, who wrote "By now, numerous books by Christians, Jews, and others have taken Christianity to task for its many failures before, during, and after the Holocaust. But few, if any, hit harder than Wilensky's." The book is divided into five parts. Part I provides a brief overview of some key events in the history of Christian-Jewish relations from the time of Jesus until the end of the Second World War. Part II specifically describes and discusses the phenomenon of Christian antisemitism. Part III covers the role of the Protestant and Catholic churches during the Nazi period and beyond. Part IV offers a short introduction to some legal concepts and provides an overview of criminal acts that Catholic and Protestant clergy, and the churches as institutions, may have been guilty of, and provides material that might have been used for an indictment had the Allies pursued another set of international prosecutions at the end of the Second World War. Lastly, the Epilogue covers post-World War II events including positive steps taken by the Catholic and Protestant churches after the Second Vatican Council.

Two appendices provide a list of anti-Jewish statements by many popes throughout history, as well as a list of anti-Jewish papal bulls.

== Main themes ==
=== The consequences of anti-Jewish teachings in Christianity ===
Wilensky devotes a sizable part of Six Million Crucifixions to describe the genesis and evolution of anti-Jewish sentiment in Christianity. He describes in some detail how the feeling of animosity began since the early days of the Christian sect, and how it grew over time into open hatred. The book explains how this feeling became part of the foundational writings and teachings of the Catholic Church, and indeed an integral aspect of early Christianity. Six Million Crucifixions shows how anti-Jewish animosity emanating from all levels of the Church hierarchy molded the image the Christian faithful held about Jews, which in time became consistently negative.

Six Million Crucifixions makes the point that even though not all Christians during the Nazi period were actively antisemitic, most were at a minimum passive bystanders during the persecution and extermination of Jews during the Holocaust. As Father John T. Pawlikowski, Director of the Catholic-Jewish Studies Program at Catholic Theological Union in Chicago stated, "(Christianity) provided a seedbed—at least for acquiesence during the attacks on Jews." Wilensky notes that even though many Christians may have disagreed with extermination as a means of solving the so-called "Jewish Question", they were passive bystanders precisely because as inheritors of centuries of anti-Jewish teachings they felt the Jews were guilty of a number of crimes and thus deserving of punishment, or that there was indeed a need to act that way in self-defense against what they perceived to be a Jewish threat. As the United States Conference of Catholic Bishops explained, "Christian anti-Judaism did lay the groundwork for racial, genocidal anti-semitism by stigmatizing not only Judaism but Jews themselves for opprobrium and contempt."

Wilensky also focuses on those people that confronted the persecution of Jews and helped to save them. In particular Wilensky acknowledges the actions of the Danish people whose help was instrumental in saving the vast majority of the country's Jews. Wilensky also notes that after the Second Vatican Council in 1965 the Catholic and Protestant churches made great progress in redressing these problems and in fostering a better understanding and acceptance of Judaism within the Christian community.

=== Indictment of the Church ===
The other major theme in Six Million Crucifixions is prosecutorial. As Michael Berenbaum, Director of the Sigi Ziering Institute points out, Six Million Crucifixions is an indictment of the Catholic and Protestant churches, with an emphasis on the Catholic Church. Wilensky makes the suggestion that after the Second World War the Allies should have set up another international trial to prosecute any members of the clergy who may have been guilty of incitement or persecution of Jews before, during and after World War II. The book presents material that might have been used in a potential indictment had the Allies chosen to set up such a trial.

== Critical reception ==
Six Million Crucifixions has generally been well received by the critical media as well as scholars in the field of Holocaust studies and readers alike. Eugene J. Fisher, who is retired associate director of the Secretariat for Ecumenical and Interreligious Affairs at the U.S. Conference of Catholic Bishops, in principle agrees with Six Million Crucifixions' main thesis that Christians need to accept that the Christian teaching of contempt toward Jews and Judaism prepared the ground for the Nazi genocide. However, Fisher finds that despite the fact that the book is well-intentioned, it is ultimately flawed as "Wilensky presents what has been called by Jewish scholars a lachrymose view of Jewish-Christian history, emphasizing the negatives and ignoring or writing off the positive aspects of our two-millennium-long encounter."

Elizabeth Breau writes in a ForeWord magazine review, "Wilensky's writing is a lucid, concise reminder of why it is important to remember how deadly religious bigotry can be." Fred Reiss at San Diego Jewish World focuses on the book's main thesis, that is, that the frequently repeated anti-Jewish sermons and writings from Christian scholars, theologians and general clergy over a very long time had a profound negative influence on the Christian faithful. He writes, "Six Million Crucifixions brilliantly explains the anti-Semitic attitude of the Catholic Church and how, over the centuries, its repeated railings against the Jewish people created brutal waves of anger, which led to repeated mass murders of Jews in various local[e]s throughout Europe."

== Publication history ==
- Wilensky, Gabriel (April 11, 2010). Six Million Crucifixions: How Christian Teachings About Jews Paved the Road to the Holocaust. QWERTY Publishers. p. 390. ISBN 978-0-9843346-4-3. 1st edition hardcover.
- Wilensky, Gabriel (June 1, 2011). Six Million Crucifixions: How Christian Teachings About Jews Paved the Road to the Holocaust. QWERTY Publishers. p. 390. ISBN 978-0-9843346-7-4. Paperback.

== See also ==
- Pope Pius XII and the Holocaust
- Antisemitism and the New Testament
