= Vertrue =

American corporation

Vertrue Incorporated
- Industry: Marketing
- Headquarters: Norwalk, Connecticut, United States

Vertrue Incorporated, headquartered in Norwalk, Connecticut, is an American consumer services marketing company. The company again received an "F" from the Better Business Bureau for making unauthorized charges to its customers' credit cards. In 2007 it was acquired by a trio of investment firms, including Rho Ventures. In 2010, Vertrue and two of its subsidiaries were found guilty of defrauding nearly 500,000 of their customers in Iowa.

== Organization ==
In the annual report, submitted to the United States Securities and Exchange Commission, in November 2006 the President and Chief Executive Officer of Vertrue is listed as Gary Johnson.

Vertrue have a European division called Adaptive Affinity, based in Edgware UK, and led by Andrew Millet. They have a number of brands in Europe including VP Rewards, Premier Club and highstreetmax.com. In America, one of their brands is MVQ SavingsAce. All of the brands specialise in positive option selling, where customers of other companies, for example Amazon.co.uk or Lastminute.com find that by not un-clicking a box during a transaction they will be signed up and billed for the memberships which is stated in the terms and conditions. The branch agreed to change its sign-up methods in June 2009. Adaptive Affinity Ltd began a process of attempting to force the removal of negative comments from their customers, by posting legal letters to a number of websites in September 2010.

== Lawsuits ==
Vertrue faced a class action lawsuit at the Middle District Court of Tennessee in which Margaret Wike claimed that Vertrue violated federal law by enrolling her in a discount club and charging a monthly fee to her debit card. The district court granted summary judgment for Vertrue, concluding that EFTA’s one-year limitations period barred Wike’s claim. Wike sought leave to add RICO claims to her complaint, alleging that Vertrue had ensnared Wike and “hundreds of thousands” of other consumers in a deceptive marketing scheme. The district court denied Wike’s request, concluding that the proposed amendment would be futile because Wike could not show she was injured “by reason of” Vertrue’s alleged racketeering activity. Wike appealed both rulings and prevailed on the summary judgment ruling but the appeals court decided not to rule on the failure to provide leave to amend complaint to include racketeering charges.

On behalf of Iowa, state attorney general Tom Miller sued the company in May 2006, saying it was signing up customers in a way that violated Iowa's Buying Club Memberships Law. According to a report posted by the Better Business Bureau, Vertrue was ordered to pay "$30 million dollars in restitution, penalties and costs after ruling the corporation violated Iowa's buying club law and used deceptive and unfair practices to market so-called buying club memberships to nearly a half-million Iowans over the last twenty years."

Vertrue has sued the Wikimedia Foundation in 2008 in Connecticut over the contents of the article on the company in Wikipedia.

The lawsuit against Vertrue, Inc. reached the Iowa Supreme Court in 2013. The lawsuit was upheld in a 6-0 ruling. Chief Justice Mark Cady wrote that the company’s practices were confusing for all consumers and a state survey showed that two-thirds of Iowans were unaware they had signed up or authorized any charges by Vertrue, Inc. The Iowa Supreme Court ruled that Vertrue's financial, privacy and health programs also violated the buying club law and added $10 million to the previous judgment for restitution, fines, and legal fees handed down by District Judge Robert Hutchison in 2010. An additional penalty of $180,000 was included after it was determined that Vertrue’s fraud targeted the elderly citizens of Iowa. Assistant Attorney General Steven St. Clair states that the ruling against Vertrue, Inc. should allow some customers to receive refunds while also deterring future fraudulent companies from operating in Iowa. The Assistant Attorney General also stated that Vertrue is still collecting monthly fees from those who haven’t cancelled their memberships.

Some of Vertrue, Inc's tactics include :

- An offer of a $25 gift card and a "30-day risk-free trial membership" to customers who had purchased unrelated items over the phone. The script was deceptive because it falsely implied the gift card was a reward for the earlier purchase and didn't inform consumers they were purchasing a membership.
- An Internet solicitation promising customers access to credit reports and scores if they signed up for a "FREE 7-day trial." The fine print noted that it actually cost $29.95 monthly. Two separate phone calls were required to cancel.

On March 13, 2014 an Atlanta law firm, Webb, Klase & lemond, LLC filed a class action lawsuit against Vertrue, Inc, Adaptive Marketing, LLC, Velo Holdings, Mastercard International, Inc., MyLife.com, Inc., and Oak Investment Partners. The suit states that Vertrue partners with MyLife.com and other deceptive online businesses to trick consumers into unknowingly joining Vertrue's "consumer savings clubs." Mastercard is included in the lawsuit because it continues to process charges for Vertrue, Inc. while knowing of the fraudulent basis by which they are made which violates Mastercard agreements.

This new lawsuit lists the companies that administer these “savings clubs” they include Adaptive Marketing, LLC, include At Home Rewards, At Home Rewards+, BusinessMax, Cross Country Savings, DealMax, Home Savings Mall, Food and Flix, Getaway and Save, Leisure Exclusives, My Great Deals, Passport to Fun, Passport to Fun+, SavingsAce, SavingSmart, Shopping Essentials, Shopping Essentials+, Simply You, Today’s Escapes, Today’s Escapes+, ValueMax, and Your Savings Club.

The tactics remain the same as consumers are tricked into joining membership into a savings club. The suit asserts that the other defendants are vital to the improper billing scheme. First, Vertrue transmits a consumer’s credit card data to the related credit card network, which the complaint alleges was Mastercard. Mastercard verifies the consumer’s identity and, the lawsuit states, analyzes the transaction to determine whether it is fraudulent. Mastercard transmits the relevant data to the cardholder’s issuing bank which, if it authorizes the charge, sends a verification message to Mastercard, which then informs the issuing bank that the charge has been authorized, according to the suit. The suit claims that the issuing bank then informs Vertrue of the authorization, at which point the purchase is completed and the issuing bank and Mastercard subsequently "clear" and "settle" all of Vertrue's charges for that day, at which point the illicitly obtained funds are sent to Vertrue. The suit contends that all the Defendants are well aware of the illegal scheme, but they nonetheless participate in order to obtain substantial transaction fees.
