= Travelodge =

Hotel chain

Travelodge is a hotel name used by separate hotel businesses in different parts of the world. The original American chain was founded in Southern California in 1939 as TraveLodge, and the first motel opened in San Diego in 1940. In 1996, HFS Inc. bought the North American Travelodge trademark rights and franchise operation. The U.S. chain later became part of Wyndham Hotels and Resorts in 2006.

In Canada, Travelodge is operated under licence by Travelodge Canada Corp., which is owned by Superior Lodging Development TL Corporation. The British Travelodge company dates from 1985 and operates independently. In Asia, Travelodge Hotels Asia, owned by Singapore-listed ICP, manages and franchises hotels in several countries.

== United States ==
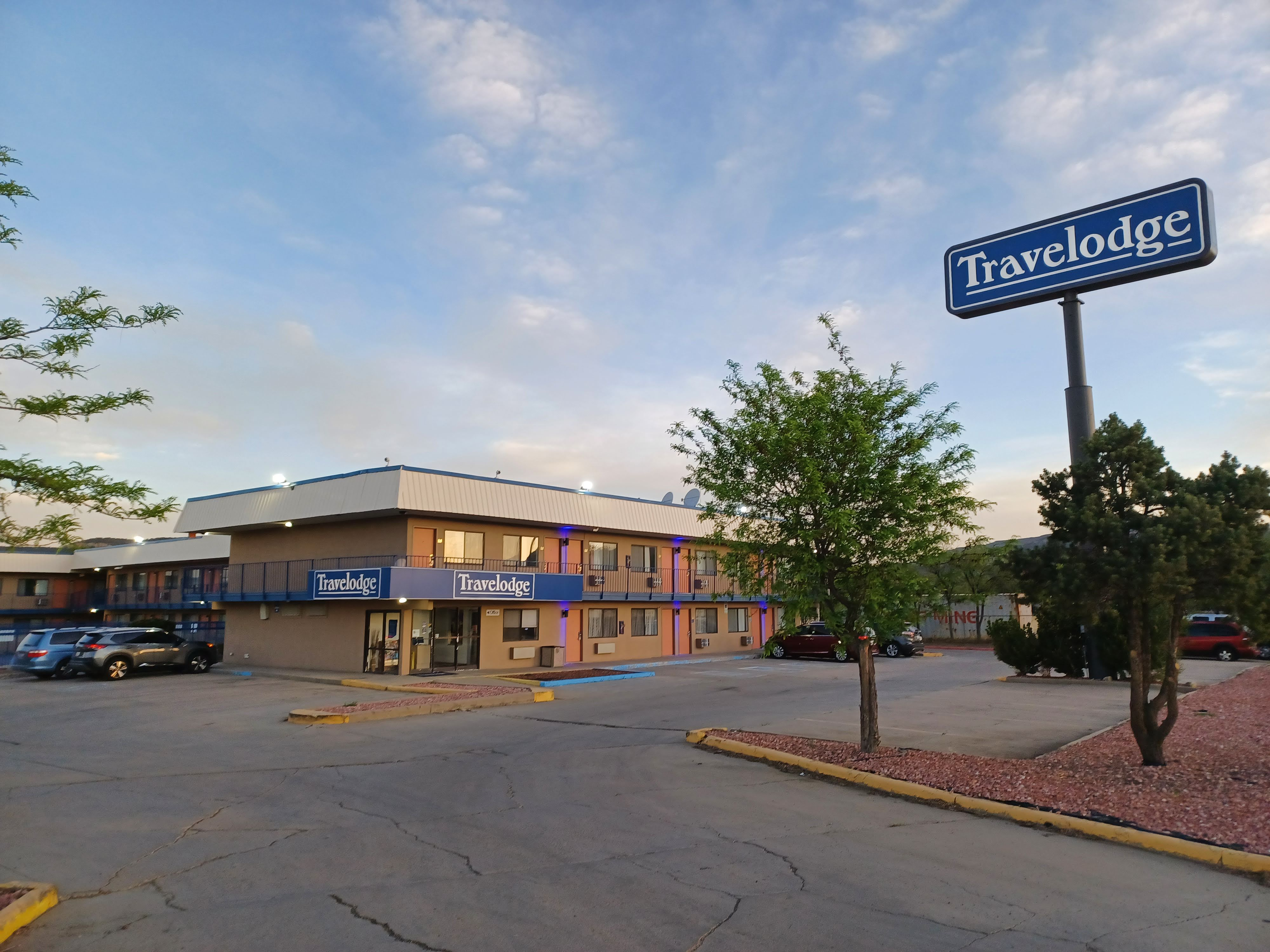
Travelodge in Raton, New Mexico

The Travelodge brand was one of the first motel chains in the United States. Travelodge Corporation, was incorporated by founder Scott King in Southern California in 1939. The first TraveLodge opened in San Diego in 1940. For many years, Travelodge was headquartered in El Cajon, California, east of San Diego. During its early years, TraveLodge emphasized itself as a budget motel chain that offered functional accommodations at rates lower than other chains. TraveLodge also emphasized that its motels were centrally located in or near downtown areas in order to be convenient to local restaurants, churches, theatres, shopping areas and tourist attractions. Today, however, there are many different hotel "tiers" that Travelodge offers, from budget-priced properties to full-service high-rise hotels. Travelodge purchased the Skylight Inn of America Inn in 1988, which was founded only six years prior in Cleveland, Ohio,

In 1996, the Forte Group sold the Travelodge operation in North America. The trademark rights and franchise system were acquired for $39 million by HFS Inc., owner of other hotel brands such as Days Inn and Ramada. HFS was later merged into Cendant Corporation, and Cendant's hotel services, including Travelodge, were spun off as Wyndham Hotels and Resorts in 2006.

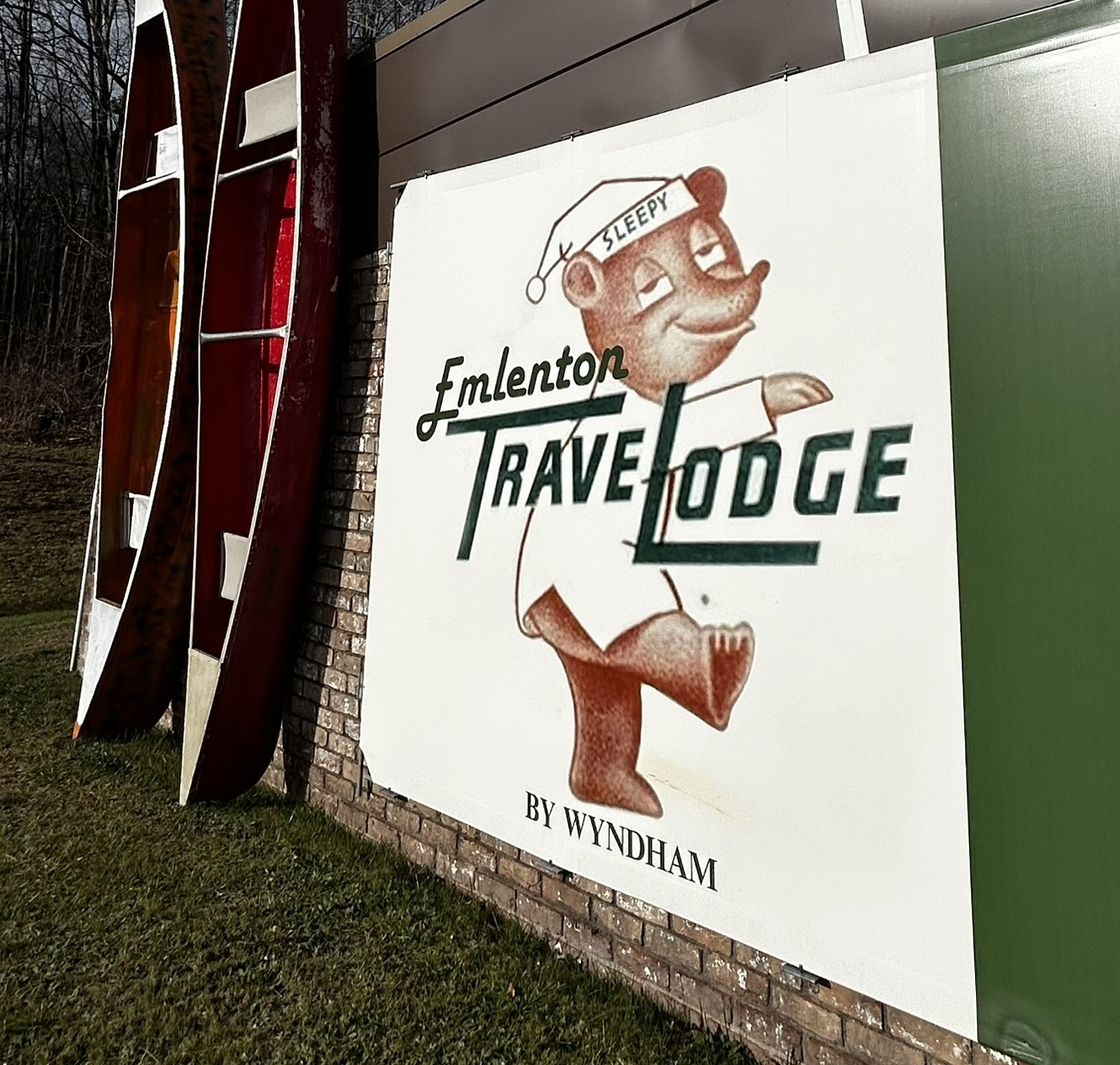
Travelodge in Emlenton, Pennsylvania with the Sleepy Bear mascot

Targeting families with children, Travelodge is well-known for its mascot Sleepy Bear, a smiling, sleep-walking teddy bear wearing a nightcap with his name, a nightshirt with the Travelodge logo, and slippers. The logo was created in 1954 by Robert Hale, while employed by Dan Lawrence Advertising agency of San Diego. Years ago, Travelodge would give a free toy plush bear to any child staying in the Sleepy Bear Den room, of which every Travelodge had at least one. The Sleepy Bear mascot has largely been retired, but can still be seen on some older Travelodge signs and is still used on some advertising.

Travelodge also has a brand of lower-price motels called Thriftlodge with another mascot named TJ, a freckle-faced bear with a baseball cap and a T-shirt with the Thriftlodge logo and the name TJ on it.

== Travelodge in other countries ==
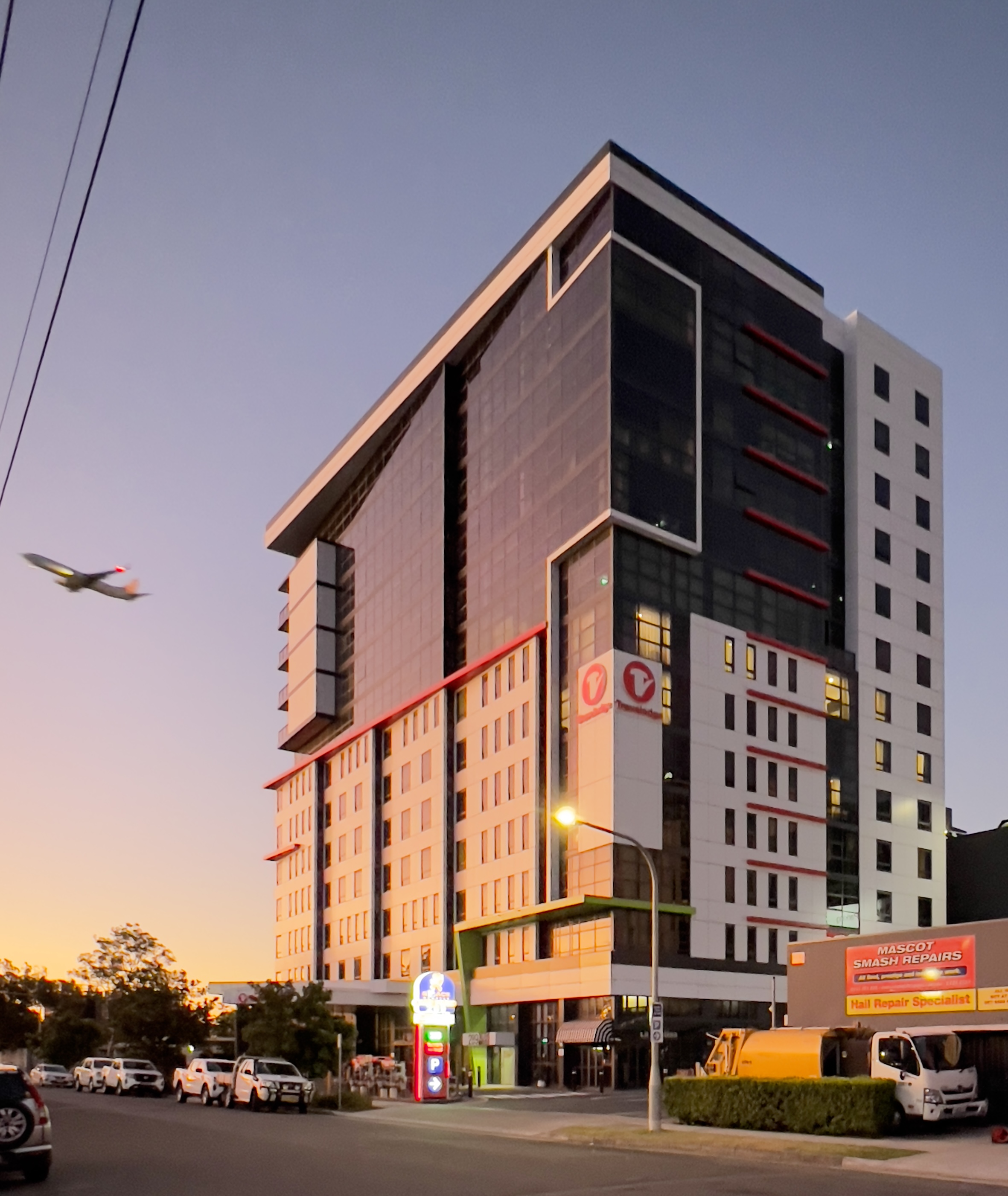
Travelodge in Sydney

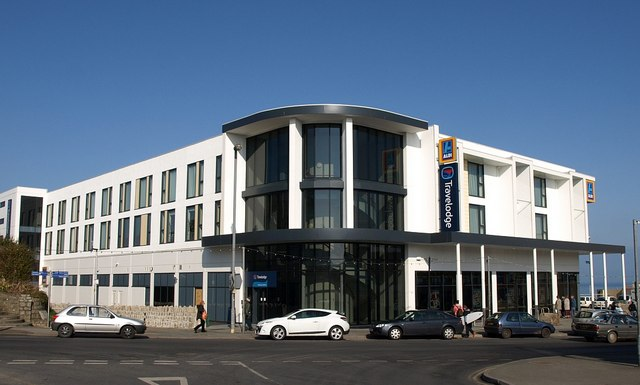
Travelodge in Newquay

=== Asia / Australia ===
Headquartered in Australia and Singapore, Travelodge Hotels Asia is responsible for the development, management and franchise of all Travelodge hotels in 22 key markets throughout Asia. The launch of Travelodge Kowloon in Hong Kong in January 2017 marks the first strategic step and key milestone for Travelodge Hotels Asia. The company, owned by Singapore-listed ICP, has expanded in other Asian countries including Thailand, Singapore, Malaysia, South Korea and Japan. Throughout 2024, Travelodge has launched several new hotels in Seoul and Busan, South Korea. Travelodge Hotels Asia has also recently opened their 20th hotel in Kyoto, Japan.

=== Canada ===
The Canadian Travelodge hotels are unusual for a Wyndham chain. Though operating under the Travelodge brand, Travelodge Canada administers the Master Licence for Travelodge and Thriftlodge in Canada. Travelodge Canada Corp. is owned by Superior Lodging Development TL Corporation based in Calgary, Alberta.

=== United Kingdom ===
Travelodge has been running in the UK since the first hotel opened at Burton Upon Trent in 1985. The company has been through several changes of ownership and reached £1bn in debts by 2008. It currently has 625 hotels. The chain is currently being financed by Goldman Sachs and the hedge fund groups GoldenTree Asset Management and Avenue Capital Group.

In November 2025, the Advertising Standards Authority (ASA) upheld a complaint against Travelodge for stating misleading minimum prices for rooms.
