= CUC International =

Former consumer services company

CUC International Inc.
- Final CUC logo used until its merger with HFS Incorporated.
- Formerly: Comp-U-Card of America, Inc.
- Type: Private (1973-1983); Public (1983-1998)
- Traded as: NYSE: CU
- Founded: 1973; 53 years ago
- Founder: E. Kirk Shelton; Walter Forbes
- Defunct: 1998; 28 years ago
- Fate: Merged with HFS Incorporated
- Successor: Cendant
- Headquarters: Stamford, Connecticut
- Area served: Worldwide
- Key people: Walter Forbes (CEO, 1981-1998); E. Kirk Shelton (president)
- Products: Software
- Brands: Comp-U-Card; Shopper’s Advantage; AutoVantage; Traveler’s Advantage
- Services: Drop shipping; Membership services
- Subsidiaries: CUC Software (1996-1998) CUC Software International S.A. Sierra On-Line Davidson & Associates (Blizzard Entertainment, Funnybone Interactive) Knowledge Adventure Berkeley Systems, Inc.
- Website: cuc.com at the Wayback Machine (archived 1998-02-09)

CUC International Inc. (CUC; short for Comp-U-Card) was a membership-based consumer services conglomerate with travel, shopping, auto, dining, home improvement and financial services offered to more than 60 million customers worldwide based in Stamford, Connecticut, US, and founded in 1973 by E. Kirk Shelton and Walter Forbes. In 1998, it became involved in a Securities and Exchange Commission investigation into what, at the time, was the biggest accounting scandal in corporate history.

== History ==
Former logo as Comp-U-Card of America, Inc.

Its main product, a shopping service, originally a membership telephone-based drop-ship service called Comp-U-Card begun in 1973, was made available online to users of The Source in the mid-1980s, and later CompuServe after its purchase of The Source. It later offered its Shoppers Advantage service on America Online, Prodigy, GEnie and Delphi as well. It was perhaps the first company conducting electronic commerce, although its web based service first went online in 1995.

CUC's main line of operations was its mail-order clubs such as Shopper's Advantage, AutoVantage, Traveler's Advantage and its Comp-U-Card program, and it had been trying to find a way to streamline its clubs and sell retail through a kind of interactive television. In an age before the internet and sites such as Amazon.com, this idea was innovative.

CUC went through various company presidents and lost a lot of money during the 1970s. By 1979, it was losing more than $2 million a year. By 1983, Forbes and his company had found investors such as Reader's Digest and Eckerd Drugs but had lost nearly $14 million. After licensing their "interactive shopping" idea in Europe, the Morgan Stanley group took CUC public in the United States in 1983 and raised $20 million.

During the 1980s and early 1990s, CUC continued to grow and acquire other companies. It made strategic deals with other entertainment, communication, retail and investment companies such as America Online and AT&T. and grew to have over 30 million customers via its mail order clubs. CUC did not make any large acquisitions until 1995. Before that time, all acquisitions were relatively small and strategic.

In February 1996, seeking to expand its operations into the field of interactive entertainment, CUC approached the software companies Sierra On-Line Inc. and Davidson & Associates Inc. It bought Sierra for $1.06 billion and Davidson for $1.14 billion, both in stock. These acquisitions allowed CUC, as a larger outlet, to streamline its distribution network. In addition, product placements and advertisements in these software companies' products allowed CUC to find new customers in demographics it had not previously reached.

In December 1997, CUC merged with HFS Incorporated. A competition was held internally at CUC, primarily among its senior marketing staff but open to all employees, to come up with a new corporate name. The winner was to receive dinner "anywhere in the world". No employee submission was selected to win, as the name of the company had already been decided. The new company was named Cendant. After the merger, Cendant retained its core business as a direct marketer and thereafter also specialized in hotel franchises, car rentals, travel agencies and its consumer software operations, Cendant Software. The merger of these two companies, which between them owned "a virtual monopoly in the worldwide market for full-service timeshare exchange services" according to the Federal Trade Commission, caused the FTC to require "the parties to divest one of their timeshare exchange companies to re-establish a viable competitor in the market".

After the April 15, 1998 disclosure of long‑running accounting fraud originating at CUC International, the company restructured its non‑core units. Cendant's software publishing unit—comprising Sierra On‑Line, Davidson & Associates (including Blizzard Entertainment), Knowledge Adventure and related labels—was sold on November 20, 1998, to the French publisher Havas (then part of Vivendi) for up to $1 billion in cash; the division became Havas Interactive and later Vivendi Games. In July 2008, Vivendi Games merged with Activision to form Activision Blizzard. In October 2000, Cendant announced plans to spin off its individual membership and loyalty businesses, and on July 2, 2001, it instead outsourced and licensed those operations (including Cendant Membership Services and Cendant Incentives) to a new company, Trilegiant, under a long‑term agreement. In October 2005, Apollo Global Management acquired Cendant's Marketing Services Division—including Trilegiant, Progeny, and CIMS—for about $1.8 billion, and the business was reorganized as Affinion Group, which was headquartered in the Stamford, Connecticut area.

On October 23, 2005, Cendant Corporation announced its decision to split into four separate companies: Realogy, Travelport, Wyndham Worldwide and Avis Budget Group.

=== Accounting scandal ===
On April 16, 1998, less than one year after the new brand was introduced, Cendant disclosed that for three years prior to the merger, CUC had fraudulently overstated its income by over US$500 million. This caused Cendant stock to plummet from $39 to $20 in a single day, eventually reaching $9, and costing shareholders about US$14 billion. Cendant/CUC was eventually required to pay more than US$2.85 billion in class action settlements to shareholders.

The Securities and Exchange Commission brought civil charges against CUC's president Kirk Shelton and CEO and chairman Walter Forbes, for the "long-running financial fraud" which, it alleged, started in 1995. The SEC stated that CUC inflated its books in order to inflate its stock price, which allowed it to use its stock to buy other companies, and in turn these mergers and acquisitions were executed in order to generate financial reserves and purchase reserves that were intended to be "big enough to bury the fraud".

Shelton was convicted in January 2005 of 12 counts of fraud and related charges and sentenced to 10 years in prison. Shelton and Forbes were tried together. Although Shelton was convicted of all 12 charges brought, the jury was unable to reach a verdict for Forbes on any charge. A hung jury also deadlocked Forbes' second trial and a third trial was set for September 2006. Retried and convicted, he was sentenced to 12 years on January 17, 2007. The former CUC chief financial officer Cosmo Corigliano, former comptroller Anne Pember and former accountant Casper Sabatino all pleaded guilty in June 2000 to several fraud and related charges.

In addition to their prison terms, Shelton and Forbes were each ordered to pay Cendant US$3.275 billion in restitution. Cendant is unlikely to ever receive the full amount, as according to the payment schedule of US$2,000 per month ordered by the judge, it would take over 134,000 years to pay.

Investigators found that over US$500 million in non-existent company income had been reported during 1996 and 1997. Membership sales revenue had been overreported and membership cancellations information held back, allowing for the company's earnings to be manipulated at will. With too much debt and too little real income, however, the real resources of the company were dwindling, despite the considerable flotation of the stock numbers. As the imaginary books and the real company finances diverged more and more, the requirements of appearances became greater. Even the cooked books were insufficient to cover all of the company's losses, at which time it turned to mergers with, and acquisition of, new companies. Purchased companies' assets could be similarly inflated, and the increase either boost operating income or write off losses. The misreporting of assets by CUC from 1995 to 1997 is similar to that performed during the Enron scandal and other more recent frauds.

=== Acquisition history ===
Date	Company	Business	Value (USD)	Ref.
1985	Benefit Consultants, Inc.(BCI)	accidental death insurance	$50MIL	
1985	Financial Institution Services, Inc. and Madison Financial Corporation (renamed FISI*Madison)	insurance and package enhancement products	$30MIL	
1988	National Card Control Inc (NCCI)	loyalty solutions and package enhancement program	—	
January 1992	Entertainment Publications	books of entertainment and dining coupons	—	
1992	Interval International	timeshare	—	
December 1992	Sally Foster	gift wrap	$31MIL	
November 21, 1994	NetMarket	Online marketplace	$1MIL	
January 1995	Essex Corporation	third-party marketer of financial products for banks	—	
February 2, 1995	Welcome Wagon	marketing to new homeowners	$20MIL	
March 1995	Credit Card Sentinel	credit card enhancement services	$22.5MIL	
March 1995	CUC Europe	European licensee	—	
September 1995	NAOG (North American Outdoor Group)	hunting, fishing and handyman membership organization	—	
October 18, 1995	Advance Ross	value-added tax refunds for travelers to Europe	$225MIL	
1996	GETKO (Getting to Know You)	home-buyer welcoming program	—	
February 6, 1996	Rent Net	nationwide apartment rental information on the Internet	$3MIL	
February 20, 1996	Davidson & Associates	software	$1,140MIL	
February 20, 1996	Sierra Entertainment	software	$1,060MIL	
February 20, 1996	Ideon (SafeCard, Wright Express & National Leisure Group (NLG))	credit card protection, fleet fuel cards, provider of vacation travel packages and cruises	$375MIL	
September 17, 1996	Book Stacks Unlimited	books	$4.85MIL	
November 5, 1996	Knowledge Adventure	software	$50−100MIL	
January 1997	Plextel Telecommunications Inc. and Tango Communications, Inc. (later merged and renamed to Spark Services)	dating	—	
January 8, 1997	NUMA	publisher of Halbert's genealogy	—	
August 15, 1997	Hebdo Mag	classified-advertisement magazine company	$440MIL	
April 1, 1997	Berkeley Systems	software	—	
July 1997	Gryphon Software (later folded into Davidson)	software	—	
September 25, 1997	Match.com	dating	—	
November 19, 1997	NetGrocer (25% stake)	online grocery and household goods service	$5MIL	

== See also ==
- Affinion Group, formerly Trilegiant (spun out from successor Cendant)
- WorldCom scandal
- Enron scandal
- Sarbanes–Oxley Act
