= Affinion Group =

American corporation

CXLoyalty
- Type: Subsidiary
- Industry: Loyalty marketing, Insurance, Identity theft protection, membership programs
- Founded: 1973
- Headquarters: 6 High Ridge Park Road, Stamford, Connecticut, U.S.
- Key people: Todd Siebel (CEO)
- Revenue: US 1.1698 billion 2015)
- Number of employees: 3,369 (2016)
- Parent: JPMorgan Chase
- Website: AffinionGroup.com

CXLoyalty (formerly Affinion Group and CUC) is a private company based in Stamford, Connecticut that provides customer engagement and loyalty programs. Affinion designs, markets, and services programs that deal with customer relationships for other businesses. The company says it reaches 250 million consumers in 20 countries. In 2006, Affinion Group was cited by Forbes as number 321 on its list of largest private companies.

In 2016, Affinion reported a worldwide workforce of approximately 3,000. As of March 2015, the company had not reported a profit since 2004. According to its Bloomberg Business profile at the end of 2014, Affinion had about 5,500 marketing partners, 59 million subscribers in membership and insurance services, and 62 million customers for loyalty programs and credit or debit card enhancement services.

== History ==
Trilegiant Corporation was formed in July 2001 when Cendant Corporation outsourced and licensed its Cendant Membership Services and Cendant Incentives businesses to the newly created entity under a long‑term agreement. In October 2005, Apollo Global Management acquired Cendant's Marketing Services Division (including Trilegiant) and reorganized the business as Affinion Group, headquartered in the Stamford, Connecticut area. Affinion rebranded as cxLoyalty in June 2019 to reflect a focus on loyalty and customer engagement solutions. In December 2020, JPMorgan Chase agreed to acquire (and by early January 2021 closed on) cxLoyalty's Global Loyalty division—including its travel platform and points bank—which now operates inside JPMorgan's payments/card ecosystem; the remaining Global Customer Engagement business subsequently rebranded in April 2021 as Tenerity, Inc.

== Scandals ==
Affinion has paid millions of dollars in civil claims and state attorney general claims, in 47 states, for unfair and deceptive trade practices, and faces multiple class-action lawsuits.

In December 2006, Trilegiant settled allegations of deceptive selling practices for failing to inform customers of auto-renewal on their membership products.

In 2013, Affinion settled allegations with 47 states that its companies misled consumers regarding membership in discount clubs. A $19 million fund was instituted to refund customers who had been subject to unauthorized charges.

Affinion acted as a third-party vendor for US Bank, which in 2014 was fined $9 million and compelled to pay $47 million in restitution, to resolve allegations that it had charged consumers for services that had not been provided. A spokesman for the bank said "We will be compensating customers who did not receive full services from Affinion, and providing our apology." According to an Affinion spokesman, some consumers were mistakenly billed for services, even though they had not provided the necessary authenticating information. In 2012, Capital One Financial was also fined over add-on services provided by Affinion.

In July 2015, the Consumer Financial Protection Bureau announced that Affinion had billed customers for services that had not actually been provided, claiming that the company owed consumers $6.8 million in refunds, and would have to pay civil penalties amounting to $1.9 million.
