= List of timeshare companies =

This is a list of the major timeshare companies worldwide.

== Timeshare companies ==
Company	Office	Resort locations	Number of resorts	Number of rooms	Number of owners
Karma Group	Singapore	India, Indonesia, Greece, France, Germany, Thailand, Vietnam, United Kingdom, Spain, Cambodia, Scotland	44	1600	160,000
Marriott Vacation Club	Orlando, Florida	United States, Caribbean, Europe, Asia	70	12,300	400,000
Hilton Grand Vacations	Orlando, Florida	United States, Caribbean, Europe	200		718,000
Disney Vacation Club	Celebration, Florida	United States	13	4,100	
Wyndham Destinations	Orlando, Florida	United States, Caribbean	100	14,000	509,000
WorldMark by Wyndham	Bellevue, Washington	United States, Mexico, Canada	93	7,100	227,000
Diamond Resorts International	Las Vegas, Nevada	Worldwide	370		
Bluegreen Corporation	Boca Raton, Florida	United States	67		212,000
Holiday Inn Club Vacations	Kissimmee, Florida	United States	28	7,273	340,000
Hyatt Residence Club		United States, Caribbean	16		
Vistana Signature Experiences (formerly Starwood Vacation Ownership)	Orlando, Florida	United States, Mexico, Caribbean	22		
Exploria Resorts	Orlando, Florida	United States	10		85,000
Westgate Resorts	Orlando, Florida	United States	28	13,500	
Shell Vacation Club	Orlando, Florida	United States, Canada, Mexico	25		86,000
Anantara Vacation Club	Bangkok, Thailand	Sanya, Bangkok, Koh Samui, Phuket, Chiang Mai, Dubai, Bali, Queenstown, New Zealand	9		
El Cid Vacation Club		Mexico, Spain, England	8		
Vida Vacations	Nuevo Vallarta, Mexico	Mexico	7		
Royal Resorts		Mexico	6		
Raintree Vacation Club		United States, Mexico, Canada	16		
Royal Aloha Vacation Club	Honolulu, Hawaii	United States	8	160	8,500
Vacation Internationale	Bellevue, Washington	United States, Mexico, Canada	44		42,000
Multi Resort Ownership Plan	Salt Lake City, Utah	United States, Mexico	40		
Landex Resorts International, Inc	Lehigh Acres, Florida	United States	1		
Global Exchange Vacation Club	Mission Viejo, California	United States	10		28,000
Magic Holidays	Mumbai, India	India, USA, New Zealand, Thailand, Singapore	37		
