= Michael Flaskey =

American businessman

- Born: August 3, 1967 (age 59); Virginia Beach, Virginia
- Education: Limestone University
- Occupation: Businessman
- Employer: Marriott Vacations Worldwide
- Title: President & COO

Michael A. Flaskey (born August 3, 1967), also known as Mike Flaskey, is an American businessman and the president and COO of Marriott Vacations Worldwide. Flaskey is also the founder and chairman of the board of Mike Flaskey Entertainment, and former CEO of vacation ownership company Diamond Resorts and marine transportation leader Hornblower Corporation. He is the creator of the Capital One MLB Open and the founder and the former executive director of the Diamond Resorts Invitational and the Diamond Resorts Tournament of Champions, now titled the Hilton Grand Vacations Tournament of Champions. Flaskey was also the founder of the former Invited Celebrity Classic golf tournament, a PGA Tour Champions-sanctioned event.

== Personal life ==
Flaskey attended Limestone University, then known as Limestone College, where he was one of the first five players to sign with the Limestone baseball program under Hall of Famer Gaylord Perry. He was a three-year team captain and was named to the NAIA All-District team. He graduated in 1990 with a bachelor's degree in physical education. In 2009, he was inducted into the Limestone Athletics Hall of Fame.

== Business activity ==
In February 2026 Flaskey was named President and COO of Marriott Vacations Worldwide. Flaskey was formerly the Chief Executive Officer of Hornblower Corporation. Flaskey is also a member of the board of directors at Invited Clubs.

In August 2021, Flaskey facilitated Diamond Resorts' acquisition by Hilton Grand Vacations, departing Diamond Resorts to launch his own sports and entertainment company, Mike Flaskey Entertainment. In March 2017, Flaskey was named chief executive officer of Diamond Resorts International. Prior to joining Diamond Resorts, Flaskey held senior leadership positions with Starwood Vacation Ownership from October 2003 to July 2006 and with Fairfield Resorts (now Wyndham Vacation Ownership) from August 1992 to September 2003.

Flaskey also served previously on the Board of Directors of Hornblower Corporation, Diamond Resorts and on the Board and Executive Committee of the American Resort Development Association (ARDA). He also serves as an independent director for Invited Clubs (formerly ClubCorp).

At Diamond Resorts, Flaskey launched Events of a Lifetime, an experiential vacation platform. He also is the founder of the Diamond Resorts Invitational, a mixed event celebrity golf tournament held annually in Orlando, Florida. In 2019, the tournament transformed into the Diamond Resorts Tournament of Champions, an official LPGA event featuring LPGA winners from the previous two seasons playing alongside a roster of world-class sports and entertainment celebrities. The tournament is now known as the HGV LPGA Tournament of Champions.

=== Media appearances ===
Flaskey regularly appears on TV including MLB Network, Fox Business, Yahoo Finance and has appeared several times on Golf Channel with professional golfers and celebrities, including John Daly, John Smoltz and Lee Janzen.
