= Marriott's Grand Chateau =

Resort in Las Vegas, Nevada

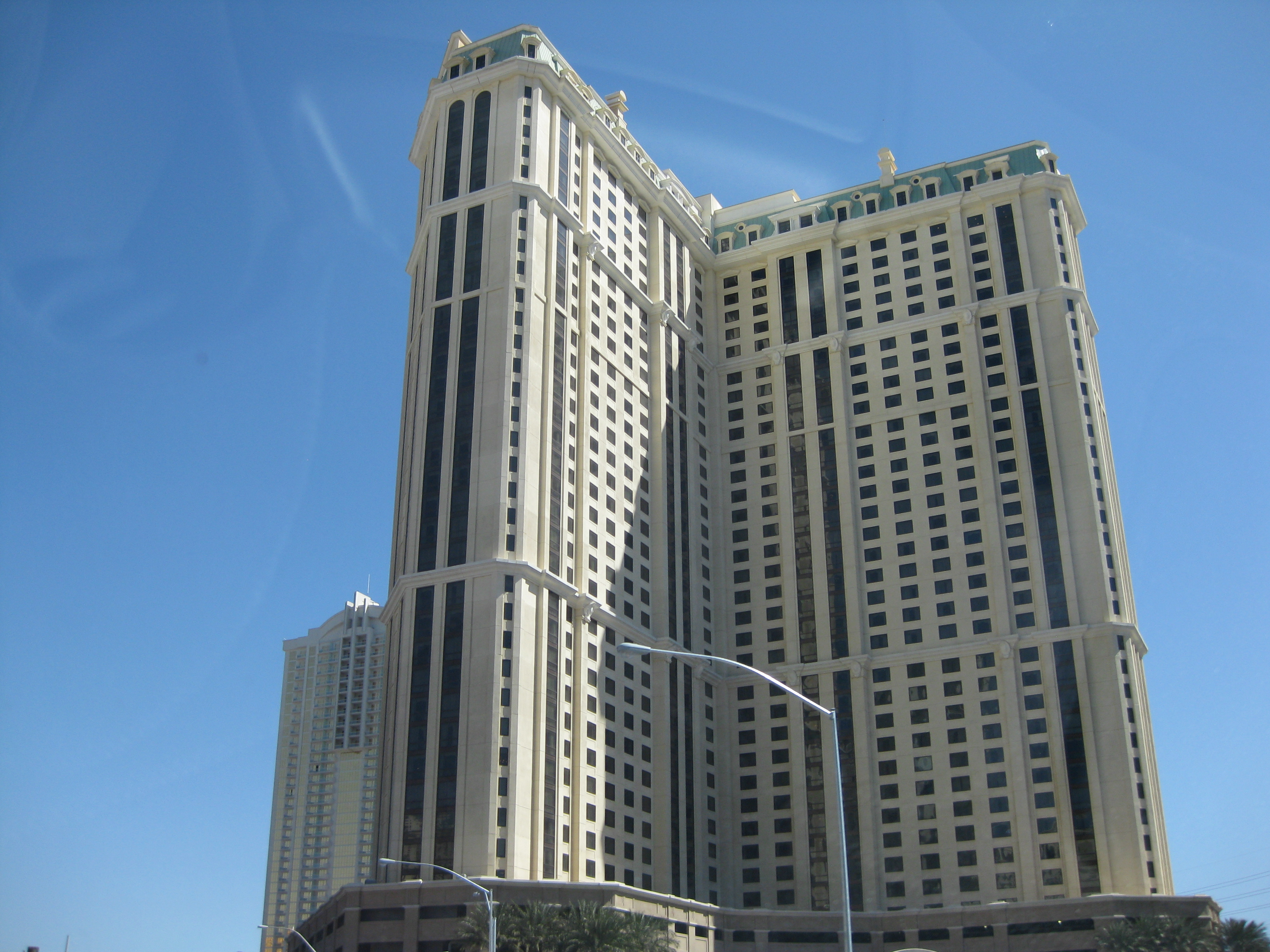
- Interactive map of the Marriott's Grand Chateau area

General information
- Status: Operating
- Type: Timeshare
- Location: Paradise, Nevada, 75 East Harmon Avenue
- Coordinates: 36.1075°N 115.1693°W
- Opening: October 2005
- Owner: Marriott Vacation Club
- Management: Marriott Vacation Club

Technical details
- Floor count: 38
- Floor area: 420 m^{2} (4,500 sq ft)

Other information
- Number of suites: 643
- Number of restaurants: 1
- Parking: 450

Website
- www.marriott.com/hotels/travel/lasvg-marriotts-grand-chateau/

Marriott's Grand Chateau is a timeshare resort near the Las Vegas Strip in Paradise, Nevada, managed by Marriott Vacation Club. It is a 38-story tower with three wings; a fourth wing is planned. It has 643 suites, and amenities including a gym, three bars, and two swimming pools.

== History ==
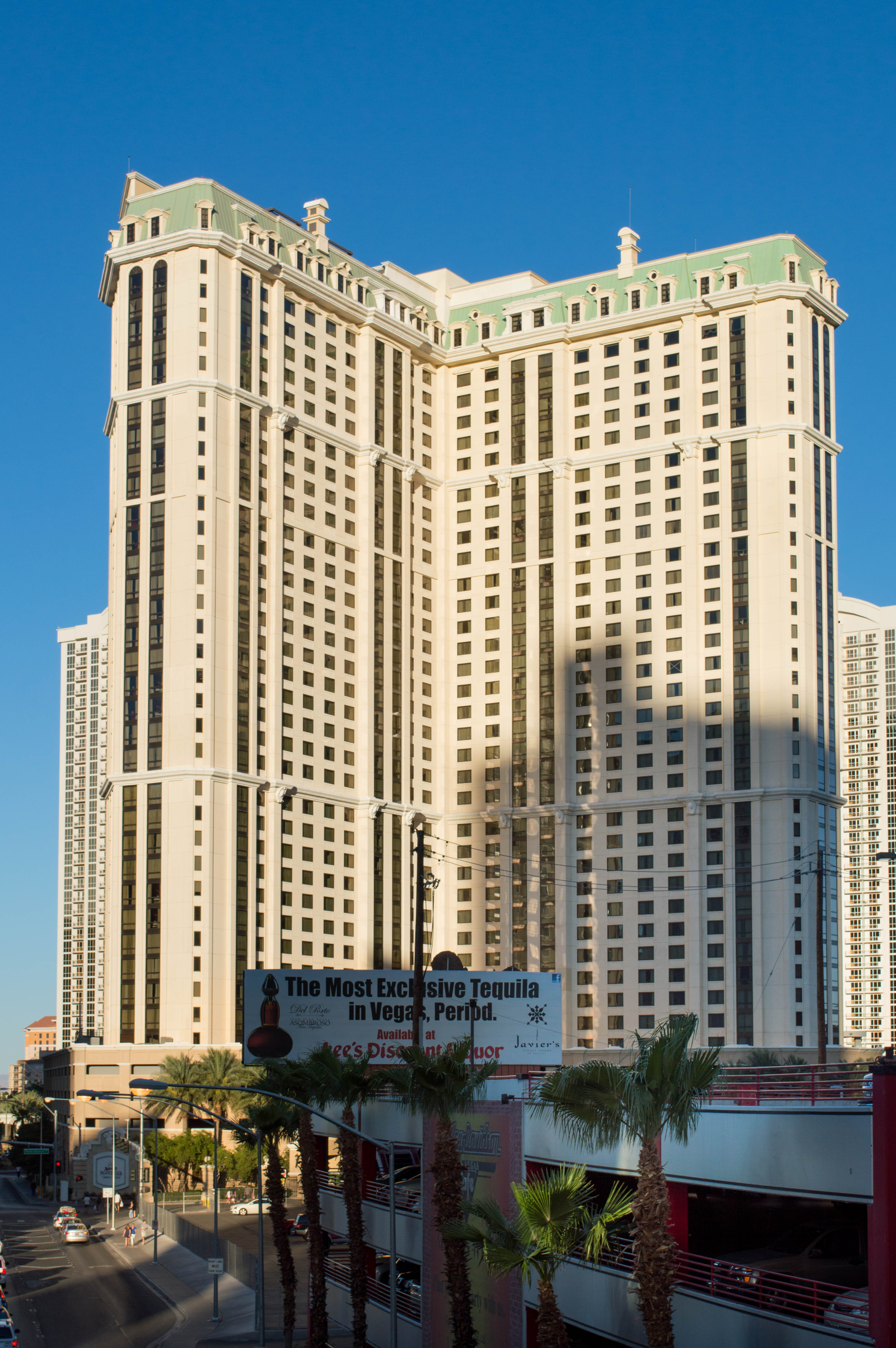

The 3.5-acre site was previously the location of a nightclub, which opened in 1978 as Jubilation, became the Shark Club in 1988, and closed in 1996.

By 1997, Grand Casinos had obtained an option to purchase the land, along with several adjacent parcels, which it hoped to develop as a major casino.

In 2000, Lakes Gaming, which had spun off from Grand Casinos in 1998, announced plans for a $700-million non-gaming hotel project on the land, in a joint venture with local developer Brett Torino. Lakes sold out its interest in the project to Torino in 2001, but retained ownership of the Shark Club parcel, revealing that it was in discussions with an undisclosed partner to build a timeshare project on the site.

Diamond Resorts International, owner of the neighboring Polo Towers timeshare complex, announced plans for The Chateau in February 2002. A later report in August 2002 described the project as a joint venture between Diamond Resorts and Lakes Entertainment (the new name of Lakes Gaming).

Marriott Vacation Club bought out Lakes's interest in the project, including ownership of the land, in June 2003.

Construction of the tower proceeded in phases. The first wing opened in October 2005, and another was scheduled for completion a year later. The third wing began construction in 2012, and was topped out a year later, with completion expected in 2014.

== See also ==
- List of tallest buildings in Las Vegas
