= Royal Holiday Club =

Timeshare chain

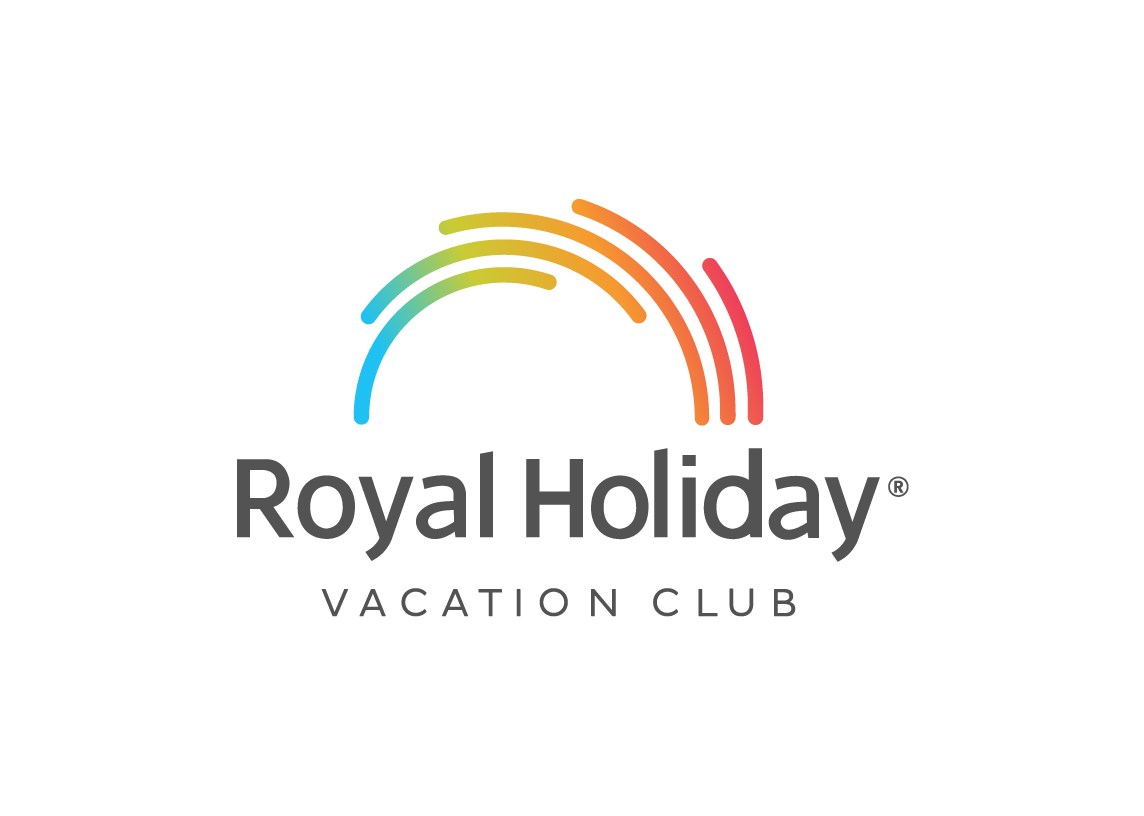
- Type: Private
- Industry: Hospitality
- Founded: 1983
- Headquarters: Mexico City

Royal Holiday Club (or Royal Holiday) is a vacation club membership operator and resort developer based in Mexico offering points-based vacation ownership.

Founded in 2000, the company opened its initial sales offices in Cancun and Cozumel in 1985, followed by later expansion to include resorts in North America, South America, Africa, Europe, and Asia. As of 2010, Royal Holiday employed about 3,500 people and maintained a membership base of approximately 85,000 members.

== Property locations ==
As of 2010, the company maintained agreements with 180 hotel properties. These hotels are located in Mexico, the United States, the Caribbean Islands, and in 49 additional countries. Although credits are primarily redeemed for lodging in one of the 180 land-based resorts managed or arranged for by the company, members are able to exchange their Royal Holiday credits for alternate hotel lodging and cruise travel via alliances with exchange fulfillment companies including Resort Condominiums International (RCI).

== Ratings and reviews ==
Following a review of Royal Holiday practices in 2009, the Better Business Bureau of Southeast Florida and the Caribbean raised Royal Holiday's prior "F" rating for reliability and service to a “B.” In 2010, this rating was elevated to an “A- and in 2011 to an A+.” According to the Better Business Bureau website, as of October 2013, there have been 299 complaints about Royal Holiday in the past three years.

== Litigation ==
In 2008, Royal Holiday was the subject of an ABC 20/20 investigation, that raised complaints in regards to the membership sales practices and contract structure. In 2007, Procuraduria Federal del Consumidor, the consumer protection agency in Mexico, received complaints from 761 of Royal Holiday's approximately 65,000 members, who sought to rescind their contracts with the company, citing misrepresentation of the offer during the sales process. According to the article, “Royal Holiday is now required by law to disclose the five-day cancellation plan, and they say they have changed their contracts accordingly.”
