= Aqua-Aston Hospitality =

Hotel management company based in Honolulu, Hawaii

Aqua-Aston Hospitality, LLC
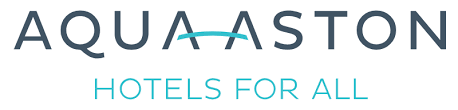
- Company type: Subsidiary
- Industry: Hospitality
- Founded: 1967; 59 years ago (as Hotel Corporation of the Pacific); 2001; 25 years ago (as Aqua Hotels & Resorts)
- Headquarters: Honolulu, Hawaii, United States
- Number of locations: 31 (2021)
- Area served: North America
- Parent: Marriott Vacations Worldwide Corporation

Aqua-Aston Hospitality, LLC is a Honolulu-based hotel management company operating a multi-branded line of hotels, condominiums and vacation resort properties primarily located in Hawaii. The chain was purchased by Marriott Vacations Worldwide in 2018.

== History ==
=== Aston Hotels and Resorts ===
Aston Hotels and Resorts served as predecessor to Aqua-Aston Hospitality. Aston was founded in 1967, as the Hotel Corporation of the Pacific (HCP) as a hotel and condominium management firm; the Hotel Corporation of the Pacific is itself traced to 1948 with the opening of the Royal Grove Hotel in Waikiki. In 1986, the Hotel Corporation of the Pacific was then renamed as Aston Hotels and Resorts. In 2007, Miami-based timeshare company, Interval Leisure Group (ILG, Inc.) acquired Aston Hotels and Resorts for $70 million.

=== Aqua Hotels and Resorts ===
Separately, Aqua Hotels & Resorts was launched in 2001 by Hawaii hotelier Michael Paulin. The company was founded as a hotel and condominium management firm, later representing 22 properties in Hawaii. In 2013, Interval Leisure Group acquired Aqua Hotels and Resorts for an undisclosed sum.

=== Aqua-Aston Merger and Marriott Vacations Takeover ===
After their individual acquisitions by Interval Leisure Group in 2007 and 2013, both companies remained mutually exclusive subsidiaries of Internal Leisure Group. In 2015, Interval announced the merger of Aston Hotels and Resorts and Aqua Hotels and Resorts. As a result of the merger, the companies were rebranded into its present name, Aqua-Aston Hospitality, LLC. On 30 April 2018, Orlando-based timeshare firm, Marriott Vacations Worldwide Corporation announced its acquisition of Aqua-Aston's parent, Internal Leisure Group in a cash and stock deal worth $4.7 Billion. The deal was completed in the September of the same year, marking Marriott Vacation's successful takeover of ILG, Inc. and its subsidiaries and brands, including Aqua-Aston Hospitality.

== Labour Disputes ==
In 2016, Aqua-Aston faced a dispute over unfair labour practice charges filed by Hawaii's hospitality and healthcare worker's union, Unite Here 5; 22 charges were filed against Aqua-Aston after employees at Aston Waikiki fought on a year-long dispute with management for rights to unionise. On 1 June 2016, the company was found guilty of federal law violations relating to unfair labour practices at an administrative law court. In 2017, a similar dispute occurred with the workers of Aqua-Aston's Ilikai Hotel in Waikiki, when a contract dispute over wages and workload resulted in a one-day worker strike involving 63 employees.

== List of Hotels ==
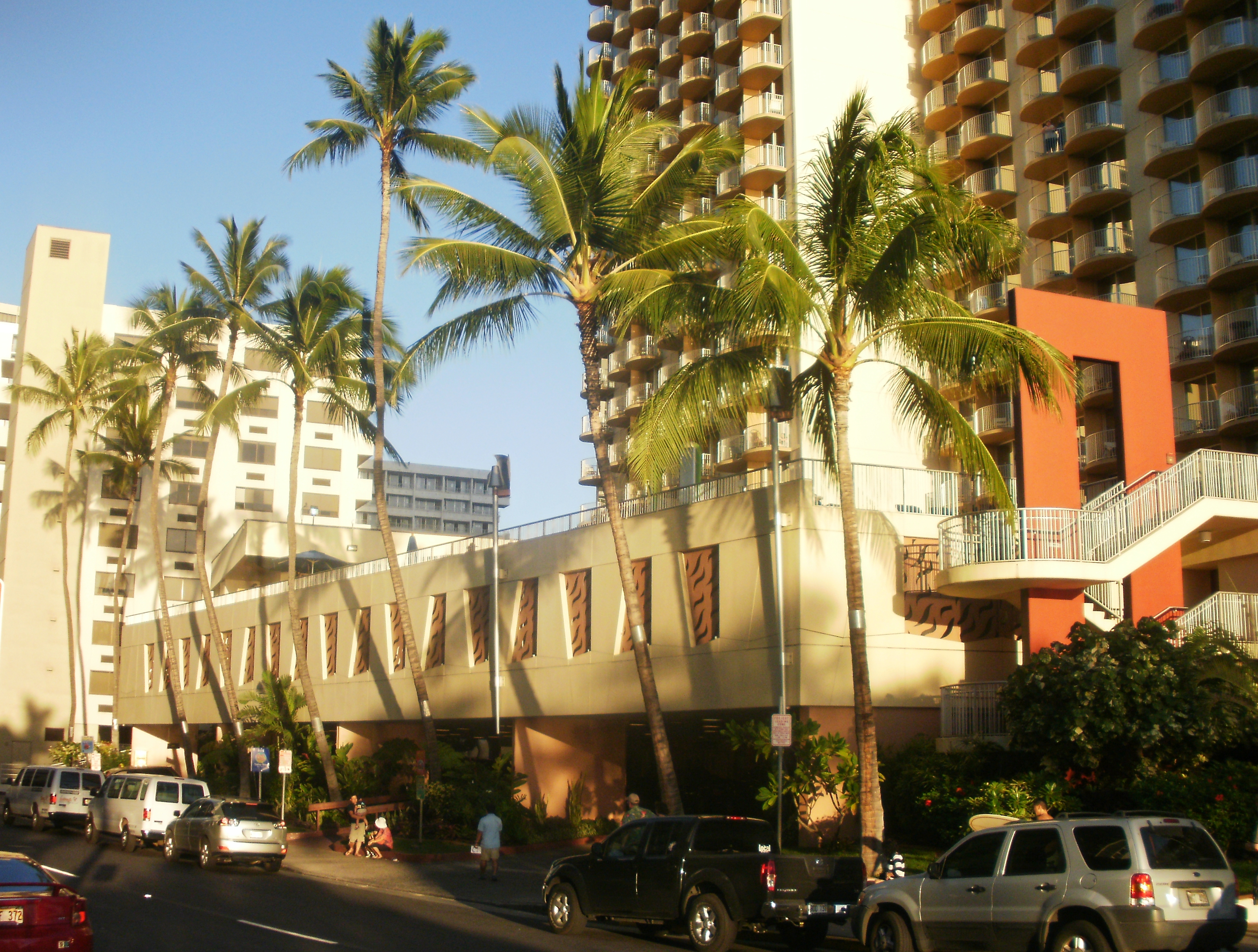
Aston at Waikiki Beach

There are a total of 31 hotel properties being managed across 4 Hawaiian islands and Costa Rica. There are fifteen on Oahu located in Waikiki, as well as seven on Maui, two on Kauai, and two on the Big Island.

=== Oahu ===
- Aqua Aloha Surf Waikiki
- Aqua Palms Waikiki
- Aqua Skyline at Island Colony
- Aston at the Executive Centre Hotel
- Aston at the Waikiki Banyan
- Aston Waikiki Beach Tower
- Aston Waikiki Circle Hotel
- Aston Waikiki Sunset
- ESPACIO The Jewel of Waikiki
- Ewa Hotel Waikiki
- Hampton Inn & Suites Oahu/Kapolei
- Ilikai Hotel & Luxury Suites
- Ilikai Lite

=== Maui ===
- Aston at Papakea Resort
- Aston at the Maui Banyan
- Aston at The Whaler on Kaanapali Beach
- Aston Kaanapali Shores
- Aston Mahana at Kaanapali
- Aston Maui Hill
- Maui Kaanapali Villas

=== Kauai ===
- Aston at Poipu Kai
- Aston Islander on the Beach

=== Hawaii Island ===
- Aston Kona by the Sea
- Shores at Waikoloa
- Waikoloa Colony Villas

=== Arizona ===
- Fairfield by Marriott Inn & Suites Tempe
- TownePlace Suites by Marriott Tempe
