= Marriott Vacations Worldwide =

American timeshare company

Marriott Vacations Worldwide Corporation
- Type: Public
- Traded as: NYSE: VAC; S&P 600 component
- Industry: Hospitality, Tourism
- Founded: Hilton Head, South Carolina, U.S.
- Headquarters: Orlando, Florida, U.S.
- Key people: Matthew Avril (CEO)
- Revenue: ▲US$ 3.89 billion (2022)
- Net income: ▲US$ 49 million (2022)
- Total assets: ▲US$ 9.6 billion (2022)
- Total equity: ▲US$ 2.98 billion (2022)
- Number of employees: 20,300
- Divisions: Interval International; Aqua-Aston Hospitality
- Website: marriottvacationsworldwide.com

Marriott Vacations Worldwide Corporation is a pure-play public timeshare company. Formerly a division of Marriott International, Marriott Vacations Worldwide was established as a separate, publicly traded entity focusing primarily on vacation ownership in November 2011. Marriott Vacations Worldwide runs more than 120 resorts with over 700,000 Owners and members in a diverse portfolio of brands under The Marriott Vacation Clubs name. Its brands include Marriott Vacation Club, The Marriott Vacation Clubs City Collection, Sheraton Vacation Club, Westin Vacation Club, Grand Residences by Marriott and The Ritz-Carlton Destination Club. The company also operates Hyatt Vacation Club as well as Interval International, which offers an exchange network and travel membership programs through a network of more than 3,200 affiliated resorts in over 90 countries and territories, as well as management of more than 160 other resorts and lodging properties.

== History ==
Marriott Ownership Resorts Inc. (MORI) was established on April 17, 1984 with the acquisition of American Resorts on Hilton Head Island, South Carolina. Marriott’s Monarch became the first MORI resort. In 1995, MORI became Marriott Vacation Club International. The move reflected the company’s evolution from real estate development and sales focus to "delivering an overall vacation experience". In 1997, the company expanded to Europe with its first resort in Marbella, Spain. In 2001, the first Asian resort in Phuket, Thailand was added to the company's collection. Similar to its successful segmentation of the lodging industry pioneered in the 1980s, Marriott Vacation Club International introduced The Ritz-Carlton Destination Club in 1999 – a luxury fractional ownership offering. Two years later, the Grand Residences by Marriott brand was created. The first property opened in 2002 in South Lake Tahoe, California. In 2007, Marriott Vacation Club International began to market its core timeshare brand as Marriott Vacation Club. In 2010, the company launched its points-based Marriott Vacation Club Destinations Program in North America and the Caribbean. This change was the most significant program innovation in the company’s history and provided a new product offering increased flexibility.

=== Vistana Signature Experiences acquisition ===
In 2016, Vistana Signature Experiences (formerly Starwood Vacation Ownership) was spun off from Starwood Hotels & Resorts and acquired by Interval Leisure Group (ILG). Vistana entered into a long-term global license agreement to use the Westin and Sheraton brands for vacation ownership.

=== Interval International and ILG, Inc. acquisition ===
In April 2018, Marriott Vacations Worldwide announced that they would purchase ILG, Inc. for $4.7 billion. Miami, Florida-based ILG was the parent entity to Interval International, which was founded in 1976. Interval International operates global membership programs for more than 1.6-million-member families. It also provides value-added services and benefits to its developer clients worldwide. Interval is currently an operating business of Marriott Vacations Worldwide Corporation.

=== The Marriott Vacation Clubs ===
In April 2023, "The Marriott Vacation Clubs". was introduced by Marriott Vacations Worldwide as the umbrella name to unify its three premium vacation ownership brands, Marriott Vacation Club, Sheraton Vacation Club, and Westin Vacation Club under one portfolio.
