= Christel House Venezuela =

School in Caracas, Venezuela

Christel House Venezuela is a school located in Caracas, Venezuela. It was opened in 2001 as an addition to the Christel House International family. Christel House Venezuela joins four other schools around the world that educate youth living in poverty.

Christel House Venezuela serves 600 children approx (294 current students and 289 Alumni). 94% of the Alumni are enrolled at the university or technical institutes, or are involved in work- study programs at the same time. The school teaches levels from 7th to 11th grade (High School). The school has 62 staff members and offers 239 program days annually.
