= Hotel Añaza =

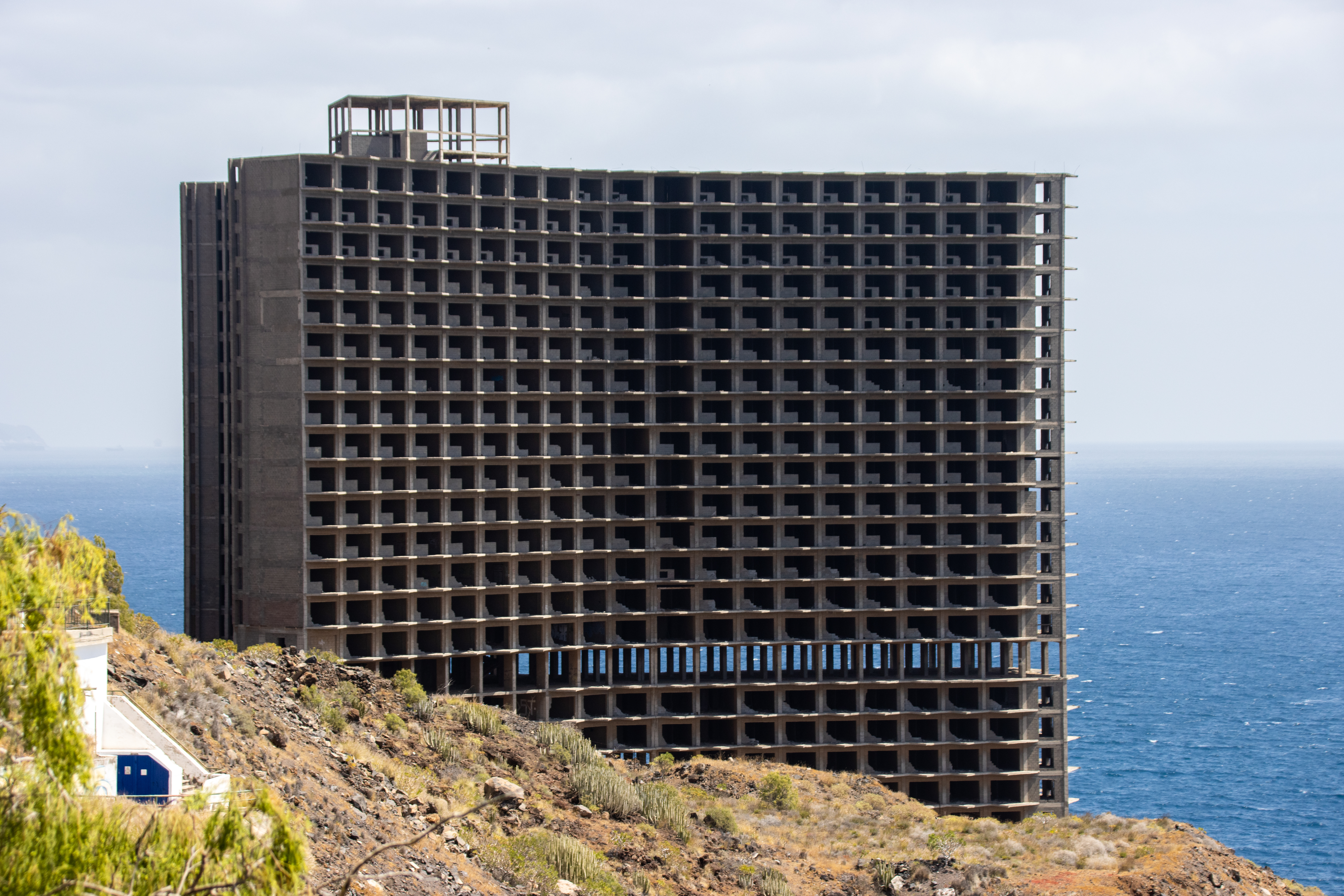
- Interactive map of the Hotel Añaza area

General information
- Status: abandoned
- Location: Acorán, Santa Cruz de Tenerife, Spain
- Construction started: 1973
- Construction stopped: 1975

Hotel Añaza is the abandoned structure of a hotel or apartment block near Santa Cruz de Tenerife, in the Canary Islands. Construction was started by a German company in 1973, but was abandoned two years later, before the building was finished. As of 2026 the structure still exists, but it is pending demolition.

== Construction ==
The building was planned to serve as an apartment building with common services, with 900 part owners as a timeshare apartment block, located on the seafront near Santa Cruz de Tenerife. It would have had 741 apartments, and a license to construct it was granted at the time.

The construction of the structure was started in 1973 by a German company. 22 stories were constructed, in a Y shape, covering an area of 2,350 square metres (25,300 sq ft) and with a total floor space of around 40,000 square metres. However, work stopped two years later, and the structure was abandoned when half-completed.

== Abandonment ==
Demolition of the building must be done at the expense of the many building owners.

The property deeds do not include the addresses of the companies that purchased the land.

Notifications in 2018 were sent to Syocsa Inarsa, who turned out to be the wrong party, so in 2019 communications were sent to various companies, including Teneriffa Ferienanlagen GmbH & CO. Treuhand- und Verwaltungs-KG, the Comunidad de Bienes Santa María, and Promociones y Servicios Los Guios, but failed to reveal the owners. It is thought that the structure is owned by over a hundred individual German citizens.

Around 2016, the owners were required to erect a 4 metres (13 ft) tall fence around the structure, and place posters prohibiting access to it. In 2019 this was ordered again, along with security cameras and multilingual posters. The security fence was subsequently installed by the Santa Cruz City Council. Several accidents have taken place in the structure, including the death of one person, and one person severely injured after falling two stories from stairs. Incidents also happened with people parachuting from the top of the building, or falling into holes. Popular videos of people doing parkour were recorded in the hotel.

In 2020, permits to demolish the building were being sought, and the possibility of the land being expropriated by the government for non-payment of municipal taxes was also being explored. In March 2021, an order was issued for the building owners to either make the building legal, or demolish it, within two months - after which the government can demolish it. The demolition is expected to cost between €1 million and €1.8 million. In June 2021, a study was commissioned of the current status of the building, including whether it contains asbestos as well as the general condition of the structure and its foundations, with the plan to demolish it in 2023, which has not materialized.
