= Marriott's Ko Olina Beach Club =

Resort in Ko Olina, Hawaii, United States

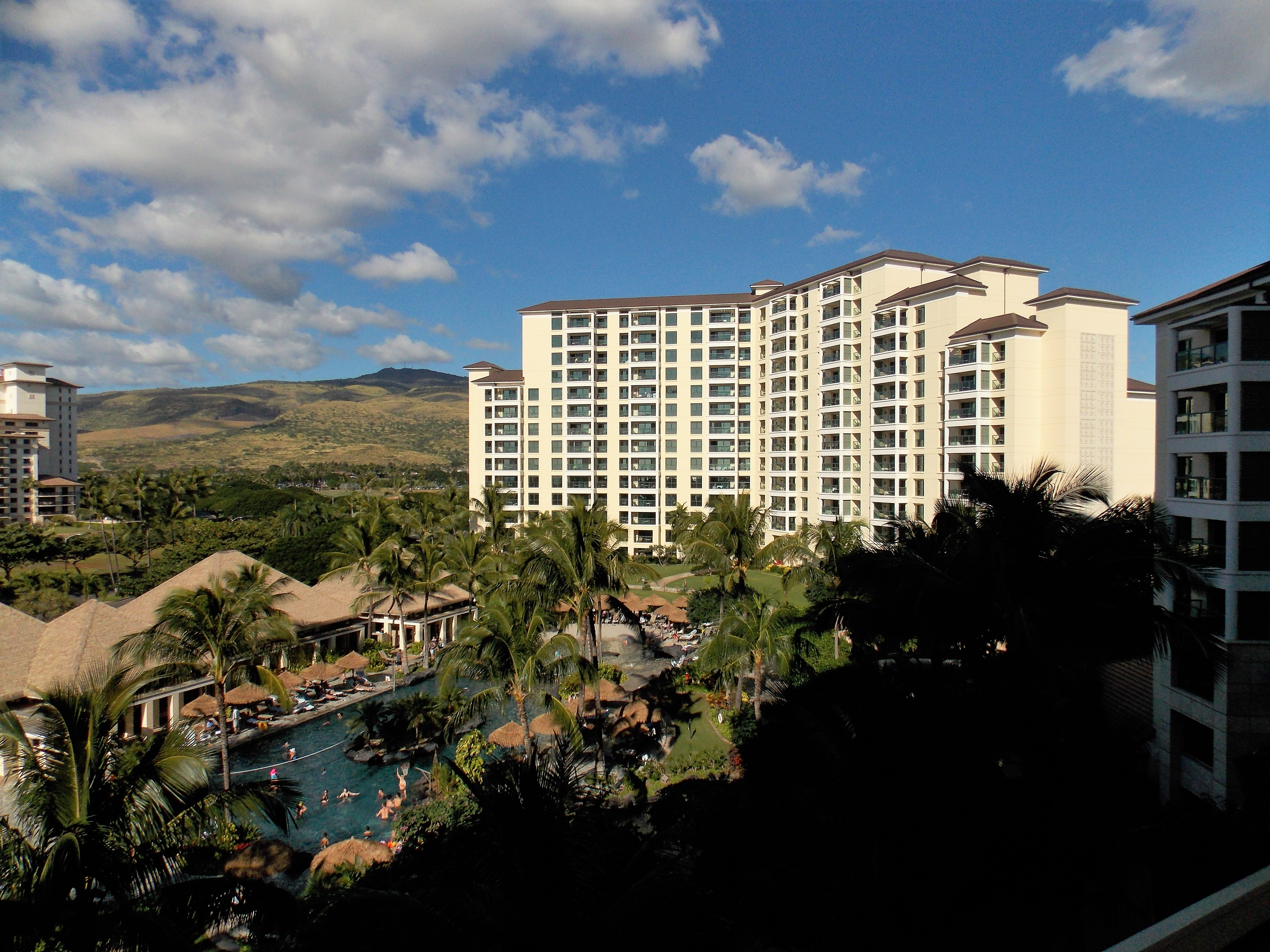
- Interactive map of the Marriott's Ko Olina Beach Club area
- Hotel chain: Marriott Vacation Club

General information
- Location: Kapolei, Hawaii, 92-161 Waipahe Place
- Coordinates: 21.331638°N 158.121210°W
- Opening: January 27, 2003
- Owner: Marriott International
- Management: Marriott Vacation Club

Technical details
- Floor count: 16

Other information
- Number of rooms: 546
- Number of restaurants: 3

Website
- Official website

Marriott's Ko Olina Beach Club is a hotel in Ko Olina, Hawaii, a resort community in Kapolei. It is located 30 minutes away from Honolulu on the western side of Oahu. Opened in 2003, the hotel consists of three resort towers, each housing roughly 200 units. The resort is expected to construct a fourth and final tower in the near future which would add an additional 202 units to the property.

Primarily a time share resort, Marriott's Ko Olina Beach Club's guest rooms offer the amenities found in homes, such as kitchens and washing machines. The resort also contains three pools and three restaurants.

Owned and managed by Marriott Vacation Club, the resort also serves as a timeshare property. The property underwent a renovation in 2014, which remodeled the rooms and updated the exteriors and cosmetic appearance of the hotel.

== History ==
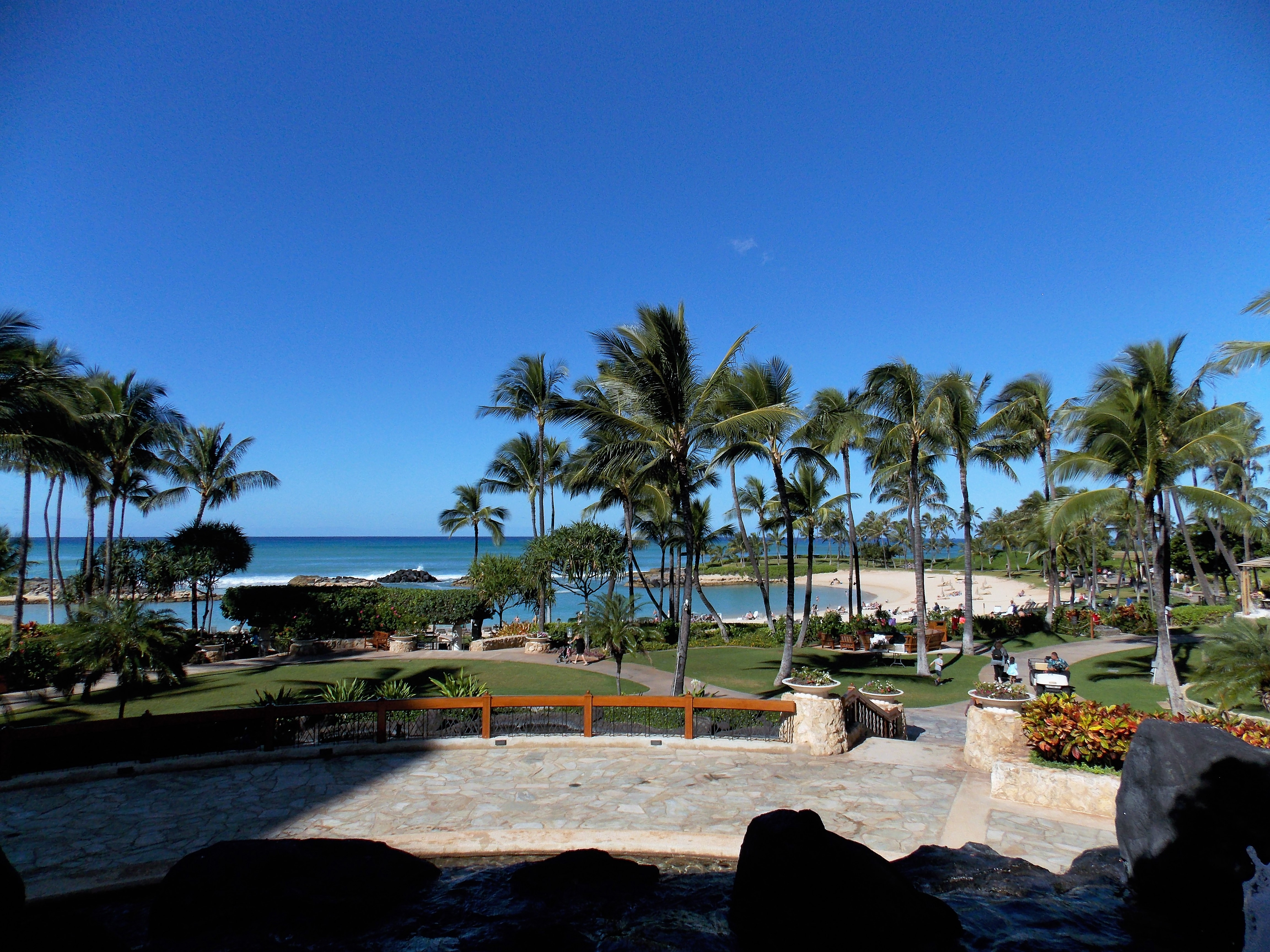
Resort property

Marriott's Ko Olina Beach Club opened on January 27, 2003, offering "timeshare units, condominiums, and villa homes" to offer the amenities of an actual home.

In 2012, the resort completed construction on the third tower in the property, adding an additional 132 units; this made Marriott's Ko Olina Beach Club the largest Marriott resort on the Hawaiian islands. During this same time, Marriott announced that condo sales at the property were at nearly 100 percent.

On January 22, 2016, Longhi's Steakhouse, a Hawaiian restaurant line, announced the opening of a future location at the resort, due for completion by May 1, 2016; Longhi's filled the space previously occupied by Chuck's Steakhouse. Marriott Vacation Club discussed plans to add 190 units to the property in June 2015, but in February 2016, they announced newer plans to construct a fourth tower at the resort, which would add an additional 202 units to the property instead. According to the hotel, Marriott's Ko Olina Beach Club is Marriott Vacation Club's most profitable property in their collection.

== Design ==
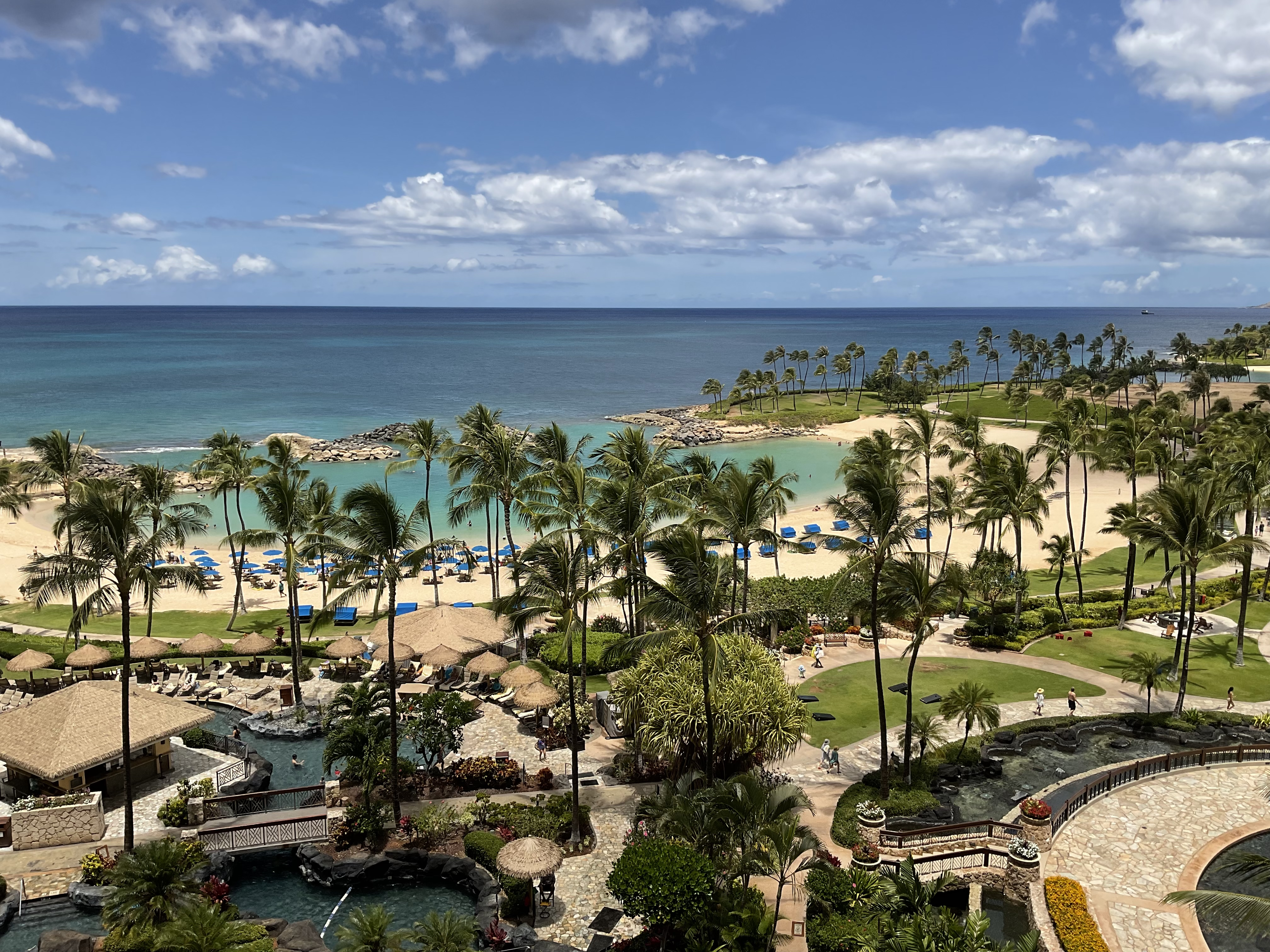
Marriott’s Ko Olina Beach Club

Marriott's Ko Olina Beach is a "plantation-style" resort, located on 650 acres of land in the Ko Olina gated community. Vice President of Hawaiian Marriott Vacation Clubs, Edgar Gum, stated that "the attention to detail and relaxing views will make for many memorable vacation experiences for our owners and guests."
