= Mystic Dunes Resort & Golf Club =

Mystic Dunes Golf Club
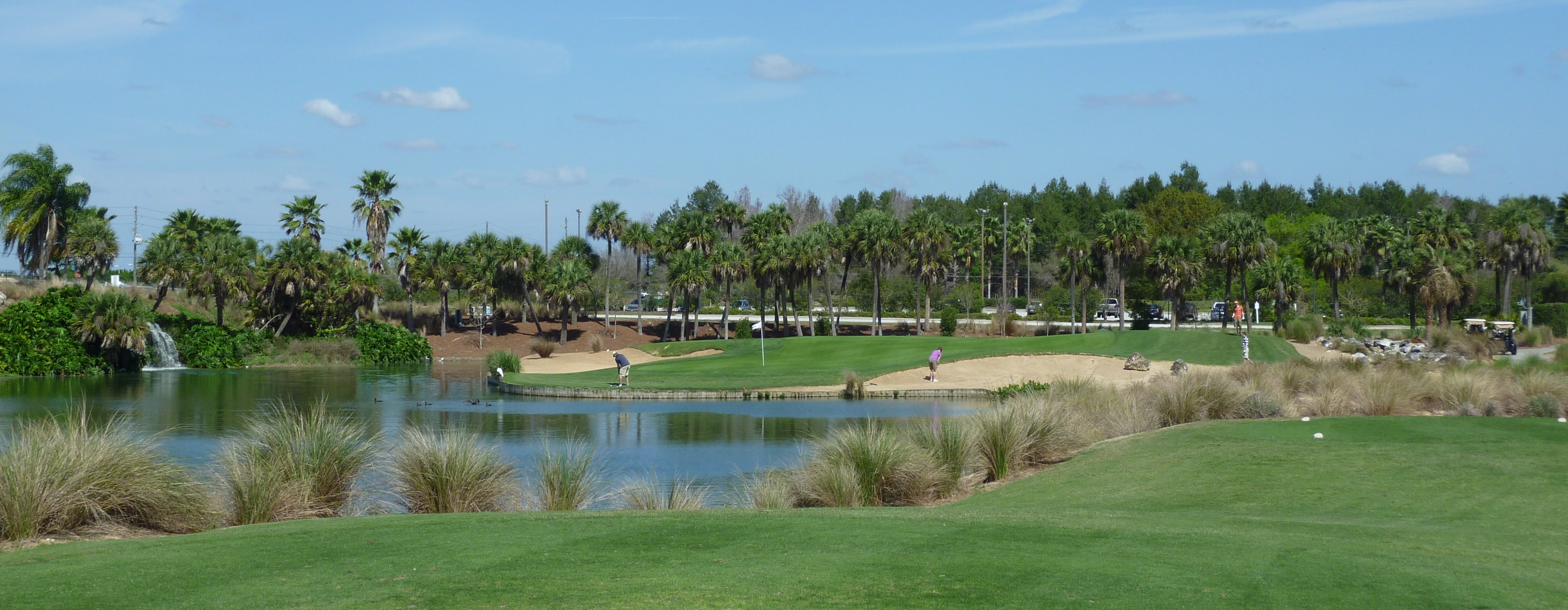
- Mystic Dunes 2nd hole

- Location within Florida
- 28°18′38″N 81°35′54″W

Club information
- Location: Celebration, Florida
- Established: 1998
- Type: Public
- Operator: Diamond Resorts International
- Website: mysticdunesgolf.com

Golf course
- Designed by: Gary Koch
- Par: 71
- Length: 7,012
- Building details

General information
- Location: Celebration, Florida, 7900 Mystic Dunes Lane
- Coordinates: 28°18′38″N 81°35′54″W
- Owner: Diamond Resorts International

Technical details
- Floor count: 6

Other information
- Number of rooms: 636
- Number of suites: 997

Website
- mysticdunesgolfresort.com

Mystic Dunes Resort & Golf Club (formerly known as Wyndham Palms) is a golf club and resort in Celebration, Florida. The resort covers over 600 acres (2.4 km^{2}) of land, including nature preserves and tropical landscapes. It is located approximately 5 miles (8.0 km) from the Walt Disney World Resort entrance in Orlando, Florida.

== Golf course ==
The golf course is a resort-style golf course in Celebration, Florida designed by Gary Koch. Par is 71. The course measures 7012 yards long from the back tees. Its signature hole is the 177-yard par 3 #2, with a waterfall to the left of the green.

Mystic Dunes Golf Club hosted nightly events during the 2017 and 2018 Diamond Resorts Invitational celebrity golf tournament.

== Amenities ==
The resort includes an 18-hole golf course, an 18-hole miniature golf course, pools, a video game arcade, bicycle checkout, and on-site dining. The resort also features a comedy magic show on Wednesday nights, for which tickets can be purchased in the clubhouse or the resort lobby. The show is also open to guests not staying on-site. Dining options include the Kenzie's restaurant at the clubhouse, the snack bar at the main pool, a snack trolley that tours the golf course, and Maui Pizza Express delivery to the suites.
