= Ko Olina Resort =

Census-designated place on Oahu, Hawaii, US

Ko Olina
- Census-designated place
- Interactive map of Ko Olina
- Coordinates: 21°20′15″N 158°7′7″W
- Country: United States
- State: Oahu, Hawaii

Area
  - Total: 1.08 sq mi (2.80 km^{2})
  - Land: 1.08 sq mi (2.80 km^{2})
  - Water: 0 sq mi (0.00 km^{2})
- Elevation: 35 ft (11 m)

Population (2020)
  - Total: 1,999
  - Density: 1,852.0/sq mi (715.08/km^{2})
- Time zone: UTC-10 (Hawaii-Aleutian)
- ZIP code: 96707
- Area code: 808
- FIPS code: 15-39400

Ko Olina Resort is a 642-acre (2.60 km^{2}) master-planned vacation and residential community on the leeward coast of Oahu, 17 miles (27 km) west of Honolulu. Ko Olina has 2 miles (3.2 km) of coastal frontage and includes three natural and four man-made lagoons with white-sand beaches. The master-planned resort community, owned by Honolulu-based The Resort Group, is home to four hotel and vacation-club resorts: Aulani, a Disney Resort & Spa, Marriott's Ko Olina Beach Club, the Beach Villas at Ko Olina and The Four Seasons Resort O'ahu at Ko Olina, and villa homes at Ko Olina Kai, Kai Lani, Coconut Plantation, and Hillside. Previously, the JW Marriott at Ko Olina occupied the Four Seasons Hotels and Resorts property. An Atlantis Resort, similar to Atlantis Dubai, was being designed as an international destination for millennial travelers, before plans were scrapped due to financial issues. The property was planned to be adjacent to the condominiums located on the Honu lagoon.

Major events hosted at Ko Olina Resort include the LPGA Lotte Championship, the Ko Olina Children's Film & Music Festival and the Hawaii Food & Wine Festival. Ko Olina is a spot frequented by celebrities.

Under The Resort Group's ownership, Ko Olina has created a $10B master-planned waterfront community, created over 5,000 jobs and generates approximately $2.5B in economic impacts for the State of Hawaii annually.

Historical population
Census	Pop.	Note	%±
2020	1,999		—
U.S. Decennial Census

== History ==
Ko Olina is part of an original royal land division that extended from the waters off Pearl Harbor to the summit of the Waiʻanae Range. The area was a sacred place used for rest and relaxation by Hawaiian chiefs, like Kakuhihewa, and Hawaiian royalty. Kamehameha the Great and his wife Ka’ahumanu were frequent visitors, bathing in the protected water of its reef-sheltered coves, fishing, and participating in religious ceremonies. Hawaii's last monarch, Lili’uokalani, also came to Ko Olina for time away.

The industrialist James Campbell helped develop much of the Ewa Plain, where Ko Olina is situated. In the late 1800s, after purchasing 41,000 acres (166 km^{2}) of arid, barren land, he had water wells drilled for irrigation and built a plantation for sugar-cane production. In the 1930s, his daughter Alice Kamokilaikawai Campbell moved to what was then a secluded shore in the area. During World War II, Ms. Campbell allowed her property at Ko Olina, which she called Lanikuhonua (“where heaven meets earth” in Hawaiian), to serve as a recreational retreat for army and navy servicemen.

In the mid 1980s, Hawaii developer Herbert Horita and his Japanese development/investment partner, Kumagai Gumi Co., Ltd and Takeshi Sekiguchi, purchased the Ko Olina Resort property and entitled, designed and built the four man-made lagoons, marina basin, golf course and all infrastructure. After the Japanese real-estate bubble burst in the early 1990s, development at the resort stopped after the completion of the golf course and just one hotel, which was the Ihilani Resort & Spa, which opened in December 1993 and is now the Four Seasons Resort Oahu at Ko Olina.

In 1998 developer Jeffrey Stone, President of The Resort Group, and partners bought the property from Herbert Horita's lender, The Industrial Bank of Japan, and began its revival. To date they have added two vacation resorts, Marriott's Ko Olina Beach Club and Aulani, a Disney Resort & Spa; villa homes, and the oceanfront Beach Villas at Ko Olina, a luxury condominium. Approximately 150 additional long- and short-term rentals are managed by owners directly or through authorized agents. Stone and partners also have added a full-service marina; two commercial centers with retail and dining; four wedding chapels; an activity center, and a beach and sports club for residents. Currently, approximately 50 percent of the 642-acre resort is developed.

Ko Olina Station and Center was developed by Honu Group, with its first phase, Ko Olina Station, opening in 2009. Ko Olina Center opened in 2010, and unlike Station, featured a second floor for office space. Located directly across from Aulani, the center's purpose is to "offer office space, speciality stores, restaurants, amenities and other services" to Ko Olina. Together, they consist of 56,000 square feet (5,200 m^{2}) of retail and office space, with Station consisting of sixteen tenants and Center consisting of fourteen. In 2014, Ko Olina Station and Center added several new retailers to their lineup, including Wyland Galleries, Island Sole, and Honolua Surf Co. After this announcement followed the expansion of Pineapple Boutique, a luxury apparel retailer, that stated the opening of a second location within the mall. However, when the JW Marriott Ihilani, a former resort in Ko Olina, announced its closure, the center's tenants became worried about their businesses; Frank Mento, the owner of Pizza Corner, a local pizzeria, joked that his pizza parlor would "lose a slice of its sales". The mall is located next to the old Oahu Railway and Land Company tracks, which originally hauled freight and passengers to the North Shore of Oahu; this location influenced the overall design of the center, incorporating the "historic" feel of the railroads.

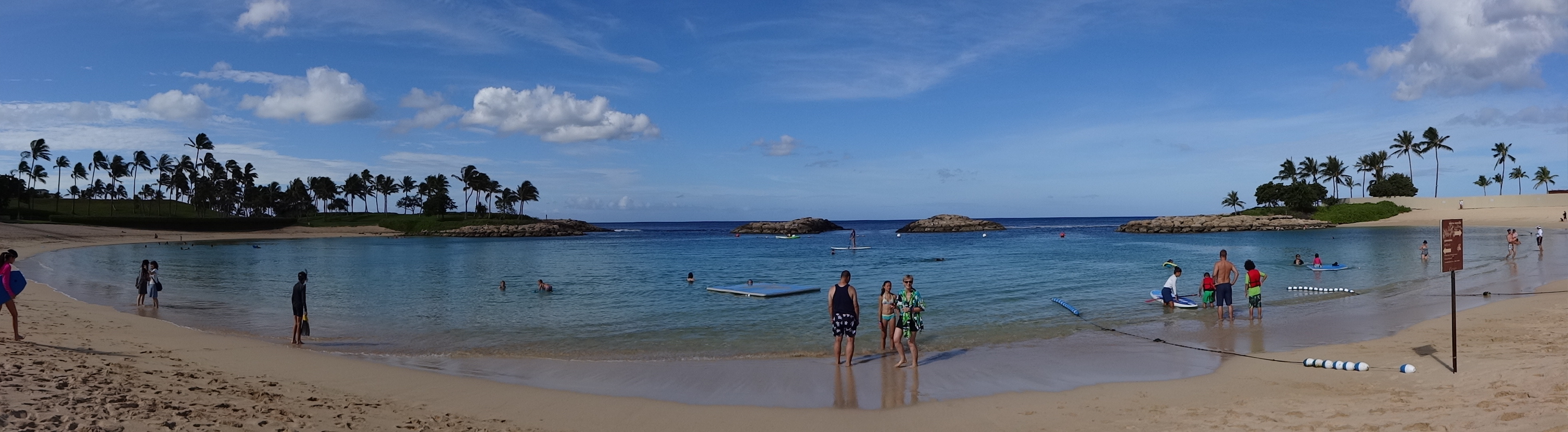
Panoramic view of Ko Olina lagoon 1, "Koholā" ("humpback whale"), located behind Disney's Aulani resort
