= Marriott's Grande Vista =

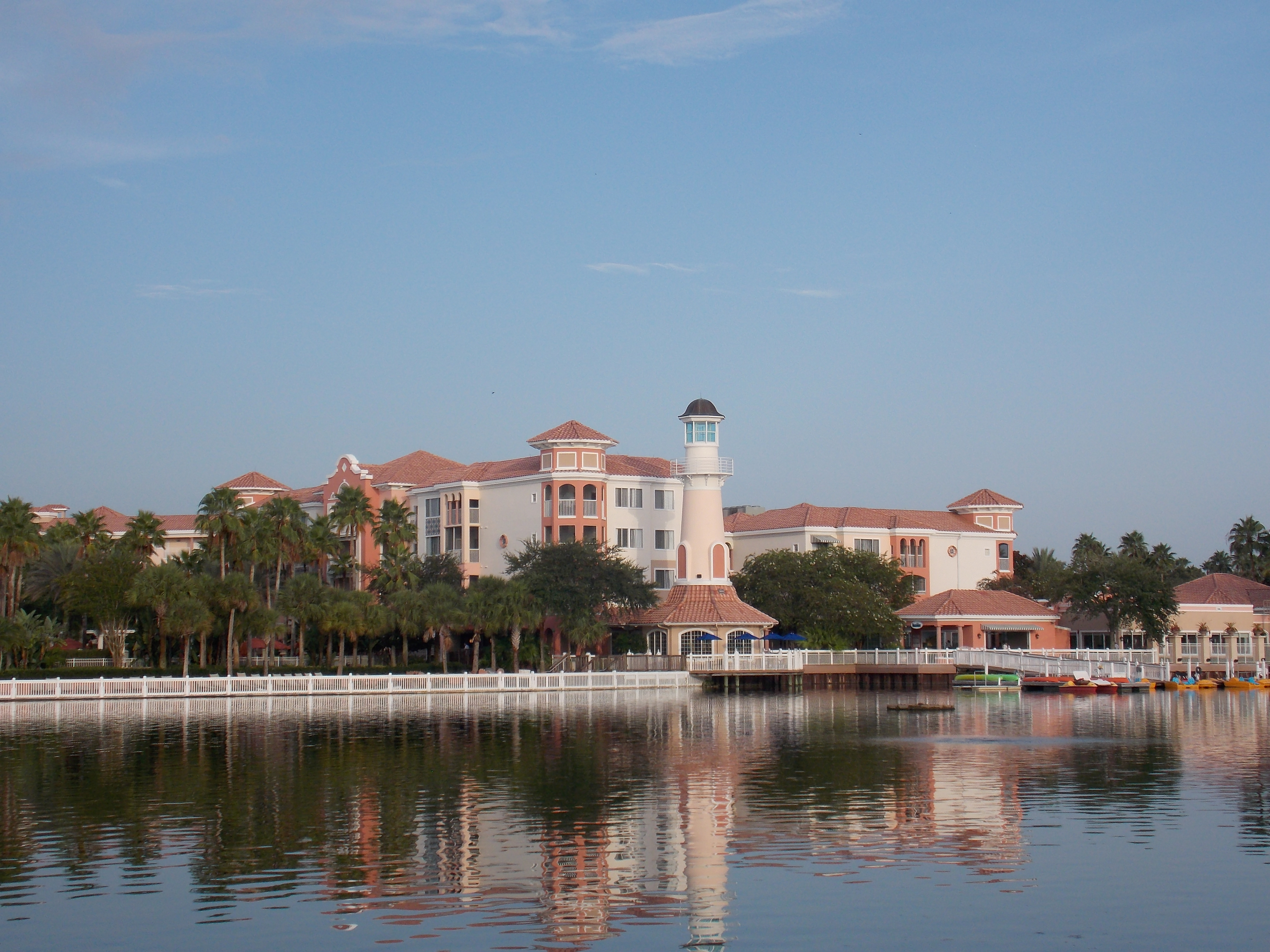
- Interactive map of the Marriott's Grande Vista area

General information
- Location: Orlando, Florida
- Coordinates: 28.3963°N 81.4569°W
- Opening: March 1997
- Owner: Marriott Vacation Club International

Technical details
- Floor count: Between 4 and 6

Other information
- Number of rooms: 1616
- Number of restaurants: 3
- Parking: $25 per night

Website
- Official website

Marriott's Grande Vista is a Marriott Vacation Club resort, on International Drive in Orlando, Florida. The timeshare resort is the largest in the Marriott Vacation Club portfolio, with 1616 guest studios, and one-, two- and three-bedroom villas in 24 Mission-style buildings.

== Resort Property ==
Situated on 164 acres (0.66 km^{2}), Marriott's Grande Vista opened in March 1997. The resort opened along with the "Faldo Golf Institute," a nine-hole golf course and training center, located on property. Construction of the resort's remaining unbuilt villas, dubbed the "West Village," continued on through the 2000s and are currently complete (with the last buildings completed in 2006). The "West Village" also includes a new pool area and bar and grill restaurant called the Copa Loca Bar and Grill (opened in 2004).

The property is home to 24 buildings, four pool areas, several restaurants and bars, a convenience store dubbed "The Marketplace," a lake, fitness center and a spa built in the summer of 2009.

The Marriott Vacation Club's Headquarters is located on Westwood Boulevard about one mile away from the property. In 2009, the resort was awarded Green Lodging certification by the Florida Department of Environmental Protection. It has won Southeast/Caribbean Resort of the Year multiple times and was also named Marriott Vacation Club's Resort of the Year in 2003 and 2010.
