= Marriott Vacation Club =

Timeshare resorts

- Formerly: Marriott Ownership Resorts, Inc.
- Industry: Hospitality, tourism
- Founded: 1984; 42 years ago
- Headquarters: Orlando, Florida, U.S.
- Area served: Worldwide
- Parent: Marriott Vacations Worldwide
- Website: marriottvacationclub.com

Marriott Vacation Club is the primary timeshare brand of Marriott Vacations Worldwide. The brand comprises around 70 Marriott Vacation Club properties throughout the United States, Caribbean, Central America, Europe, and Asia. Marriott Vacation Club resorts consist of one, two, and three-bedroom villas, with more than 400,000 owners.

== History ==
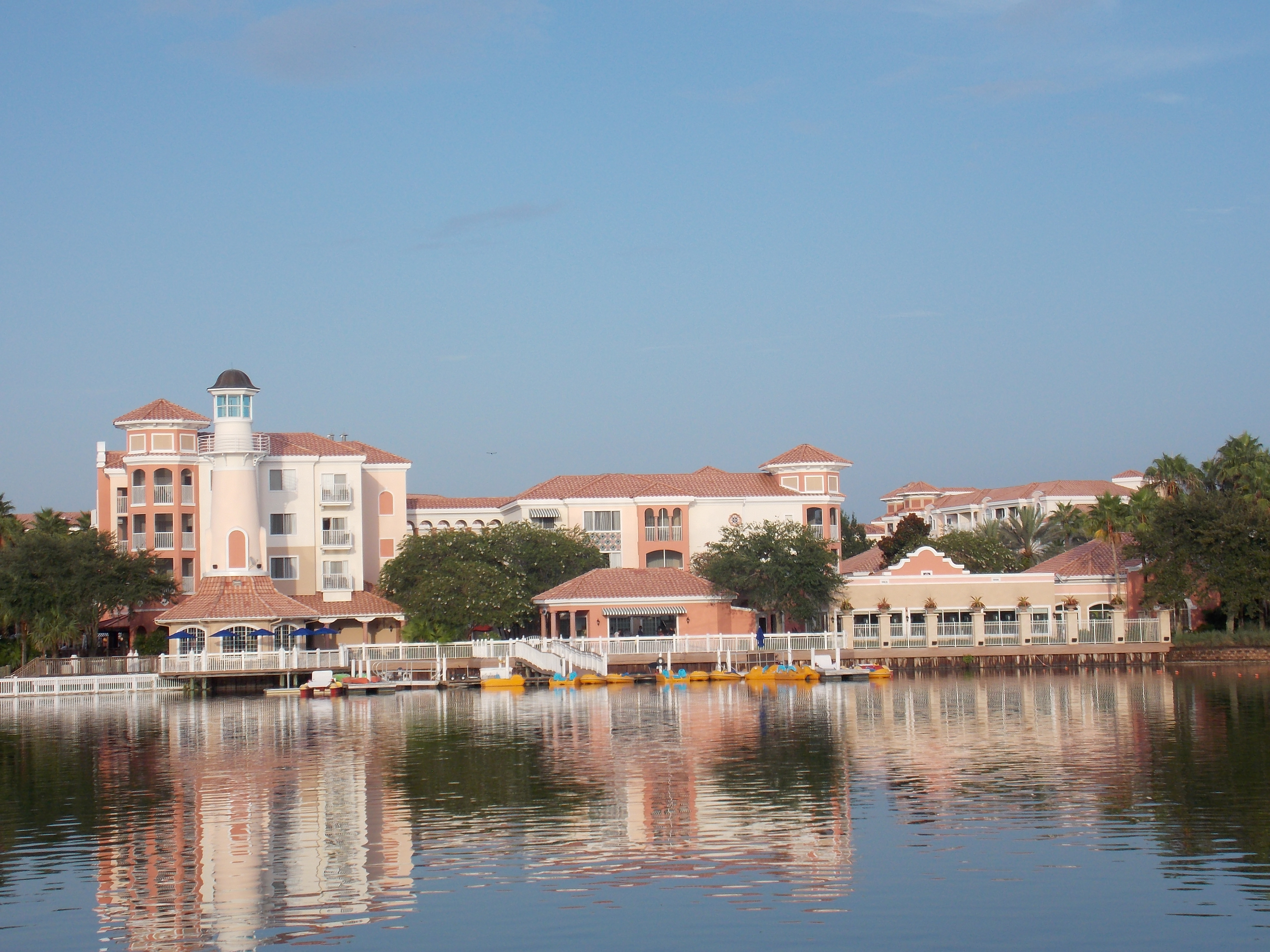
Grande Vista in Orlando, Florida

Marriott Ownership Resorts, Inc. was established in 1984 (on April 17) on Hilton Head Island, South Carolina, with the acquisition of American Resorts and its 184 villas on Hilton Head Island, which later became the Marriott's Monarch at Sea Pines resort. In 1987, Marriott Rewards (introduced in 1983) started a partnership with the Marriott Ownership Resorts. In 1990, Marriott begins an exchange partnership with Interval International (ILG, Inc.), allowing Owners to trade weeks at their home resort for access to other resort destinations worldwide. In 1995, Marriott Ownership Resorts, Inc. was renamed, becoming Marriott Vacation Club International (MVCI) reflecting the company's evolution from real estate development to vacations. In 1996, Marriott Vacation Club International (MVCI) opened its first European property called Marriott's Marbella Beach Club in Costa del Sol, Spain. In 1997, Marriott Vacation Club International (MVCI) opened its first Caribbean property called Marriott's Aruba Ocean Club in Palm Beach, Aruba. In 1999, Marriott introduced The Ritz-Carlton Club (Ritz-Carlton Destination Club since April 2009), a luxury fractional ownership offering. In 2001, Marriott Vacation Club International (MVCI) opened its first Asia property called Marriott's Phuket Beach Club in Phuket, Thailand. In 2001, the first property of Marriott Grand Residence Club (Grand Residences by Marriott since 2006) opened in South Lake Tahoe. In 2007, Marriott Vacation Club International began to market its core timeshare brand as Marriott Vacation Club.

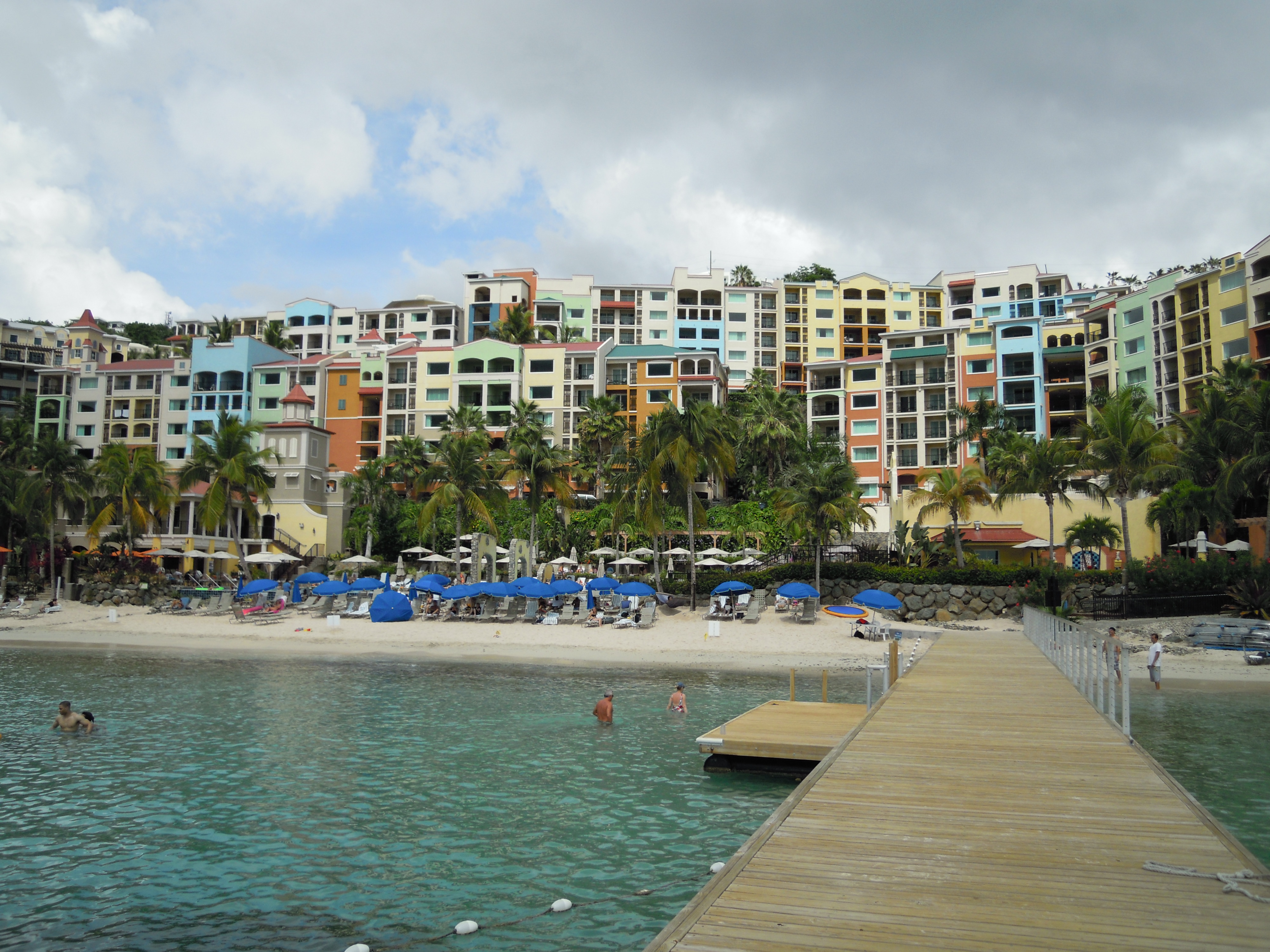
Frenchman's Cove in the United States Virgin Islands

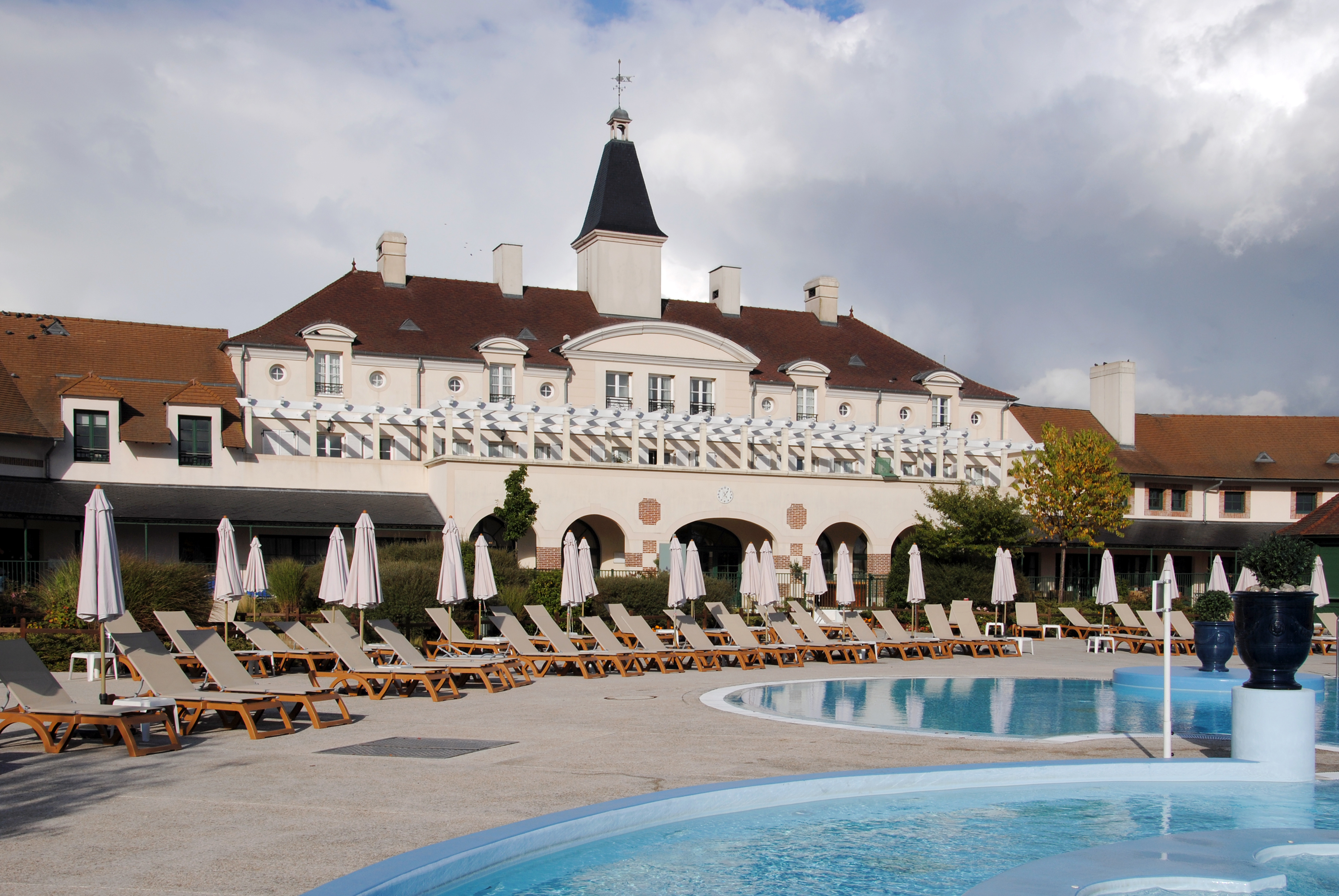
Marriott's Village d'Ile de France, near Disneyland Paris

In 2010, the Marriott Vacation Club Destinations program was introduced. The Destinations program allows owners to redeem Vacation Club Points for stays at Marriott Vacation Club resorts, Marriott hotels, travel packages and resorts through Interval International.

In 2016, Marriott Vacation Club introduced the Marriott Vacation Club Pulse brand. These properties, set in urban locations, are designed for shorter stays. The brand launched with locations in New York City, San Diego, South Beach, Washington, DC and Boston.

As of 2018, Marriott Vacation Club is one of 4 brands that includes Marriott Vacation Club Pulse, The Ritz-Carlton Destination Club and Grand Residences by Marriott. There are around 70 Marriott Vacation Club branded resorts throughout the world, including three resorts in Spain (Costa del Sol, Mallorca and Marbella) one in France (near Paris) and three in Thailand (one in Bangkok and two in Phuket).

== Structure ==
Originally, Marriott Vacation Club properties were sold as weeks. A "fixed week" granted the owner the right to use their villa during a specific week each year (such as week 52, which includes New Year's Eve), or the right to use their villa during a specific "season" (defined on a per-resort basis), which granted the owner the right to reserve their villa for any available week within that season. Weeks at some properties could be split, enabling a non-consecutive four-night stay and three-night stay. Weeks could be exchanged for Marriott Rewards (now Marriott Bonvoy) points. Finally, owners of multi-room villas, such as a two-bedroom lockoff, could split the unit itself and book each half as a separate reservation. Notably, owners cannot reserve villas at other properties without exchanging them through Interval International (II). "Weeks owners," as they are called, pay annual maintenance fees that supposedly cover maintenance and refurbishment at the resort.

The Marriott Vacation Club Destinations program changed this structure. Owners now purchase points at a particular property, which can be "spent" to reserve a villa for a given number of nights during a given season. Villa "pricing," in points, differs based on the size of the unit and the season. Points can also be used to reserve villas at other properties, without having to exchange through II. "Points owners," as they are called, pay annual dues, which cover maintenance and refurbishment, much like maintenance fees for weeks owners.

"Weeks" owners can "enroll" their week(s), for a fee, into the Destinations program, effectively converting their week(s) into points on an annual basis.

Marriott Vacation Club continues to sell weeks at some properties, particularly when they acquire weeks from owners wishing to sell them. Marriott Vacation Club has a contractual "right of first refusal" on all resales. If an owner obtains a purchase agreement for their week(s), Marriott Vacation Club can choose to pay the agreed-upon purchase price to obtain the week(s), effectively cancelling the sale. This approach can have the effect of keeping an owner from selling for below market value, since Marriott Vacation Club can effectively take the week(s) "off the market."

Each Marriott Vacation Club property effectively has up to two inventories of villas. Older properties' inventories consist mainly of "weeks owners." Newer properties' inventories consist mainly of points, wherein all available points are owned by a Marriott Vacation Club-controlled trust, and made available to owners who purchased under the Destinations program. Many properties have inventory of both weeks and points. It is important for owners to understand that these two inventories do not intermingle. For example, suppose an owner purchased 2,000 points at Property A, and wished to occupy a villa at Property B. Property B is an older property that was 100% sold-out as weeks. The owner will probably be unsuccessful, because there is no "points inventory" at Property B from which to fulfill their request. It is important for prospective owners to fully understand the differences between the inventories and to ensure their purchase will afford them the occupancy they desire.

The creation of the Destinations program has been controversial and resulted in lawsuits.

== Similar programs ==
- Bluegreen Resorts
- Diamond Resorts
- Disney Vacation Club
- Hilton Grand Vacations
- Westgate Resorts

== Properties ==
Marriott Vacation Club Resort Properties
Property	Location
Marriott Grand Residence Club, Lake Tahoe	South Lake Tahoe, California, USA
Marriott Vacation Club Pulse at Custom House, Boston	Boston, Massachusetts, USA
Marriott Vacation Club Pulse at The Mayflower, Washington, D.C.	Washington, District Of Columbia, USA
Marriott Vacation Club Pulse, New York City	New York City, New York, USA
Marriott Vacation Club Pulse, San Diego	San Diego, California, USA
Marriott Vacation Club Pulse, San Francisco	San Francisco, California, USA
Marriott Vacation Club Pulse, South Beach	South Beach, Florida, USA
Marriott Vacation Club at Surfers Paradise	Surfers Paradise, Queensland, Australia
Marriott Vacation Club at The Empire Place	Sathorn, Bangkok, Thailand
Marriott Vacation Club, Khao Lak Beach Resort	Takua Pa District, Phang Nga, Thailand
Marriott Vacation Club at Los Sueños	Herradura, Puntarenas, Costa Rica
Marriott's Aruba Ocean Club	Palm Beach, Noord, Aruba
Marriott's Aruba Surf Club	Palm Beach, Noord, Aruba
Marriott's Bali Nusa Dua Gardens	Nusa Dua, Bali, Indonesia
Marriott's Bali Nusa Dua Terrace	Nusa Dua, Bali, Indonesia
Marriott's Barony Beach Club	Hilton Head Island, South Carolina, USA
Marriott's BeachPlace Towers	Fort Lauderdale, Florida, USA
Marriott's Canyon Villas	Phoenix, Arizona, USA
Marriott's Club Son Antem	Mallorca, Balearic Islands, Spain
Marriott's Crystal Shores	Marco Island, Florida, USA
Marriott's Cypress Harbour	Orlando, Florida, USA
Marriott's Desert Springs Villas	Palm Desert, California, USA
Marriott's Desert Springs Villas II	Palm Desert, California, USA
Marriott's Fairway Villas	Absecon, New Jersey, USA
Marriott's Frenchman's Cove	St. Thomas, U.S. Virgin Islands, USA
Marriott's Grand Chateau	Las Vegas, Nevada, USA
Marriott's Grande Ocean	Hilton Head Island, South Carolina, USA
Marriott's Grande Vista	Orlando, Florida, USA
Marriott's Harbour Club	Hilton Head Island, South Carolina, USA
Marriott's Harbour Lake	Orlando, Florida, USA
Marriott's Harbour Point	Hilton Head Island, South Carolina, USA
Marriott's Heritage Club	Hilton Head Island, South Carolina, USA
Marriott's Imperial Palms	Orlando, Florida, USA
Marriott's Kauai Beach Club	Lihue, Kauai, Hawaii, USA
Marriott's Kauai Lagoons - Kalanipuʻu	Lihue, Kauai, Hawaii, USA
Marriott's Ko Olina Beach Club	Kapolei, Oahu, Hawaii, USA
Marriott's Lakeshore Reserve	Orlando, Florida, USA
Marriott's Legends Edge at Bay Point	Panama City, Florida, USA
Marriott's Mai Khao Resort - Phuket	Mai Khao, Phuket, Thailand
Marriott's Manor Club	Williamsburg, Virginia, USA
Marriott's Marbella Beach Resort	Marbella, Andalusia, Spain
Marriott's Maui Ocean Club	Lahaina, Maui, Hawaii, USA
Marriott's Monarch	Hilton Head Island, South Carolina, USA
Marriott's Mountain Valley Lodge	Breckenridge, Colorado, USA
Marriott's MountainSide	Park City, Utah, USA
Marriott's Newport Coast Villas	Newport Coast, California, USA
Marriott's Ocean Pointe	Palm Beach Shores, Florida, USA
Marriott's Oceana Palms	Riviera Beach, Florida, USA
Marriott's OceanWatch at Grande Dunes	Myrtle Beach, South Carolina, USA
Marriott's Phuket Beach Club	Mai Khao, Phuket, Thailand
Marriott's Playa Andaluza	Estepona, Andalusia, Spain
Marriott's Royal Palms	Orlando, Florida, USA
Marriott's Sabal Palms	Orlando, Florida, USA
Marriott's Shadow Ridge	Palm Desert, California, USA
Marriott's St. Kitts Beach Club	St. Peter Basseterre, St. Kitts, St. Kitts and Nevis
Marriott's StreamSide	Vail, Colorado, USA
Marriott's Summit Watch	Park City, Utah, USA
Marriott's Sunset Pointe	Hilton Head Island, South Carolina, USA
Marriott's SurfWatch	Hilton Head Island, South Carolina, USA
Marriott's Timber Lodge	South Lake Tahoe, California, USA
Marriott's Village d'Ile-de-France	Bailly-Romainvilliers, Île-de-France, France
Marriott's Villas at Doral	Doral, Florida, USA
Marriott's Waikoloa Ocean Club	Waikoloa Beach, Hawaii, Hawaii, USA
Marriott's Waiohai Beach Club	Koloa, Kauai, Hawaii, USA
Marriott's Willow Ridge Lodge	Branson, Missouri, USA
The Ritz-Carlton Club and Residences, San Francisco	San Francisco, California, USA
The Ritz-Carlton Club, Aspen Highlands	Aspen, Colorado, USA
The Ritz-Carlton Club, Lake Tahoe	Truckee, California, USA
The Ritz-Carlton Club, St. Thomas	St. Thomas, U.S. Virgin Islands, USA
The Ritz-Carlton Club, Vail	Vail, Colorado, USA

== See also ==
- Time-share
