= Timeshare donation =

Timeshare donation is a consumer relief strategy that allows timeshare owners a legitimate way out of their timeshare ownership. The concept of timeshare donation is less than ten years old, but gains popularity each year as the timeshare resale market continues to falter. In recent years, due to a severely depressed timeshare resale market owners looking to sell their timeshare have little success. Timeshare owners also face a myriad of unscrupulous timeshare listing companies looking for large up-front fees with the promise that their timeshare will soon be out of their name. Typically the listing company cannot sell their timeshare, nor do they have an incentive because they can collect another listing fee after the original listing contract expires. For many timeshare owners, trying to sell their timeshare becomes a vicious cycle of broken promises, high fees, and little to no interest from buyers. According to the Florida Attorney General’s Office, timeshare owners are also especially vulnerable to timeshare resale scams. Ultimately, many owners look to simply give-away, or donate their timeshare to a willing party because their timeshare investment has become a liability.

== Methods ==
=== Sale to relative or friend ===
A relative or friend of the owner might make good use of the timeshare. This method commonly involves selling the timeshare for $1 and proceeding with the formal transfer of title, typically performed by a timeshare closing and escrow company.

=== Donation to a charity ===
Some charities accept timeshare donations. A few charities are able to utilize timeshare weeks to generate revenue, by renting them to donors, or offering the vacation week for auction at a charity event. However, most charities are unable to take on deeded ownership of a timeshare, so they opt to sell the timeshare. If a charity sells the timeshare and keeps the proceeds as a donation, the donor is then entitled to a tax deduction.

Timeshare properties worth more than $5,000 need a written appraisal in conformity with IRS standards. Publication 561 provides details on the form of written appraisal and the additional paperwork that needs to be attached to the return to secure the deduction.
