= LPGA Tournament of Champions =

Women's Professional Golf Tournament

Hilton Grand Vacations Tournament of Champions

Tournament information
- Location: Orlando, Florida
- Established: 2019
- Course: Lake Nona Golf & Country Club
- Par: 72
- Length: 6,617 yards (6,051 m)
- Tour: LPGA Tour
- Format: Stroke play - 72 holes
- Prize fund: $2.1 million
- Month played: January/February

Tournament record score
- Aggregate: 260 Jessica Korda (2021)
- To par: −24 as above

Current champion
- (United States) Nelly Korda

Location map
- Location in the United States Location in Florida

The Hilton Grand Vacations Tournament of Champions is a women's professional golf tournament on the LPGA Tour in Florida. It debuted in 2019 at the Four Seasons Golf & Sports Club Orlando in Lake Buena Vista, Florida. The tournament field is limited to winners on LPGA Tour events in the previous two years. As is the case in the past, there is also a pro-am and celebrity tournament, like its predecessor. The top amateurs during the midweek pro-am are invited to play in the main tournament. Each professional is paired with two celebrities or amateurs in the groupings, and celebrities change per round. A Stableford-based system is used for the celebrities and amateurs.

For 2022, under new corporate ownership of Hilton Grand Vacations and tournament director Aaron Stewart, son of World Golf Hall of Fame member Payne, the event moves to the Lake Nona Golf & Country Club in Orlando. The move to Lake Nona also eliminates an issue that the 18th hole, a par 3, caused at Four Seasons where the 2020 tournament was pushed to an extra day on Monday morning as the single playoff hole (the 18th) failed to produce a winner, and it was the seventh playing of the 18th hole that finally created a winner.

The celebrity division continues to be controlled by Mardy Fish and John Smoltz; the two have won three each.

In the United States, the final round of the tournament is broadcast on NBC.

== Tournament names ==
- 2019–2021: Diamond Resorts Tournament of Champions presented by IOA
- 2022–present: Hilton Grand Vacations Tournament of Champions

== Winners ==
=== Pro Division ===
Year	Date	Champion	Country	Winning score	To par	Margin of victory	Purse ($)	Winner's share ($)
2026	Feb 1	Nelly Korda	United States	68-71-64=203	–13	3 strokes	2,100,000	315,000
2025	Feb 2	Kim A-lim	South Korea	65-69-67-67=268	−20	2 strokes	2,000,000	300,000
2024	Jan 21	Lydia Ko	New Zealand	69-67-68-70=274	−14	2 strokes	1,500,000	225,000
2023	Jan 22	Brooke Henderson	Canada	67-66-69-70=272	−16	4 strokes	1,500,000	225,000
2022	Jan 23	Danielle Kang	United States	68-67-69-68=272	−16	3 strokes	1,500,000	225,000
2021	Jan 24	Jessica Korda	United States	65-69-60-66=260	−24	Playoff	1,200,000	180,000
2020	Jan 20	Gaby López	Mexico	65-69-71-66=271	−13	Playoff	1,200,000	180,000
2019	Jan 20	Ji Eun-hee	South Korea	65-69-66-70=270	−14	2 strokes	1,200,000	180,000

Note: 2020 tournament extended to five days because of darkness.

=== Celebrities and amateurs ===
During the Pro-Am tournament that is held earlier in the week, the top amateur golfers are invited to participate in the main tournament.

For both amateurs and celebrities, the golfers play a modified Stableford system, with maximum score of two strokes over par. Scores are based on the maximum score (zero). Under Rule 21 of the Rules of Golf, the player's hole ends when he has reached maximum score even if he did not finish the hole.

Points	Strokes taken in relation to par
10	Albatross (3 strokes under par)
8	Hole in One (Par 3)
5	Eagle (2 strokes under par)
3	Birdie (1 stroke under par)
2	Par
1	Bogey (1 stroke over par)
0	Maximum Score (2 strokes over par)

Year	Celebrity	Winning score
2026	Mardy Fish (5)	126
2025	Joe Pavelski	145
2024	Jeff McNeil	138
2023	Mardy Fish (4)	152
2022	Derek Lowe	138^{PO}
2021	Mardy Fish (3)	158
2020	John Smoltz (3)	150
2019	John Smoltz (2)	149

Note: The celebrity tournament is regarded as a continuation of the Diamond Resorts Invitational celebrity division.

== Tournament records ==
Year	Player	Score	Course	Round
2021	Jessica Korda	60 (−11)	Four Seasons	3rd

== See also ==
- Diamond Resorts Invitational
