= RCI (company) =

Timeshare exchange service company

- Company type: Subsidiary
- Founded: 1974
- Founder: Jon and Christel DeHaan
- Headquarters: Parsippany, New Jersey; Carmel, Indiana, United States; Kettering, England
- Key people: Olivier Chavy (President)
- Parent: Travel + Leisure Co.
- Website: http://www.rci.com/

RCI (formerly Group RCI and, before that, Resort Condominiums International) is a timeshare exchange company with over 4,300 affiliated resorts in 100 countries.

Founded in Indiana in 1974 by Jon and Christel DeHaan, RCI is one of the two main timeshare exchange businesses, along with Interval International (II).

RCI is part of Wyndham Destination Network and the Wyndham Worldwide family of brands.

== Corporate structure ==
RCI's corporate headquarters is in Parsippany, New Jersey. ln India, RCI's corporate office is in Bangalore, India. Its North American membership office is in Carmel, Indiana, and its European membership office is in Kettering, England, with several satellite servicing offices around the world. Its Asia Pacific membership office is in Singapore.

In July 2007, RCI was merged with Holiday Cottages Group, another of Wyndham Worldwide's subsidiaries. The two would still retain their individual names but operated under the parent name Group RCI until 2010, when the two companies changed the name to Wyndham Exchange and Rentals. In 2018 RCI became part of the split off of Wyndham Worldwide into Wyndham Destinations.

== Business model ==
RCI is a timeshare exchange company. It does not develop or sell timeshares (this falls within the province of RCI's sister subsidiary Wyndham Vacation Clubs). A customer who buys a timeshare with an RCI-affiliated developer (whether Wyndham or another entity) has the option to become a member of RCI. Such membership entitles the individual to exchange their timeshare with other members; RCI facilitates and fulfills the exchange. Alternatively, a timeshare owner with an RCI-affiliated developer under a points-based system can book reservations through RCI with another RCI affiliate.

== Litigation ==
A class action lawsuit against RCI was pursued by Green Welling LLP on behalf of RCI Weeks Program members in New Jersey of 2006. The plaintiff alleged that RCI actually rents out the most desirable and highly demanded vacation weeks from the spacebank, thus depleting the most desirable options available to Weeks Program members who seek exchanges. The lawsuit was settled in favor of the plaintiff. Benefits for RCI members would have begun on January 11, 2010, but one or more appeals of the entry of the final judgment were filed. Thus the effective date began July 28, 2010, when all appeals were resolved.

In 2012, RCI, while not admitting any wrongdoing, settled the class action concerning its timeshare renting tactics in favor of claimants in the US and agreed to compensate those who had suffered. It might be noted that each person was only paid 12.00 for the lawsuit.

== Awards ==
- In 2013, 2012, 2011, 2010, and 2009, RCI was named one of the Best Places to Work in Indiana by the Indiana Chamber of Commerce.
- In 2009, RCI (Grupo RCI Mexico) was named to the 2009 List of Best Companies to Work for in Latin America.
- In 2009, RCI (Grupo RCI Mexico) was named to the 2009 Best Places to Work for in Mexico.
