= Christel DeHaan =

Billionaire (1942–2020)

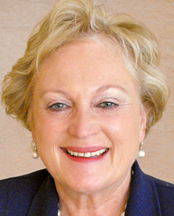
- Born: Christel Stark; October 20, 1942; Nördlingen, Bavaria, Germany
- Died: June 6, 2020 (aged 77); Indianapolis, Indiana, US
- Occupations: Founder, Christel House International
- Known for: Co-founder and former owner, Resort Condominiums International
- Spouse: Jon DeHaan (m. 1973; div. 1987)
- Children: 3

Christel DeHaan (née Stark, October 20, 1942 – June 6, 2020) was a German-American businesswoman and philanthropist who was the owner of Resort Condominiums International and the founder of Christel House International.

== Early life ==
DeHaan was born in 1942 in Nördlingen, Germany, the daughter of Adolf Stark, a German soldier who died shortly before the end of World War II, and his wife Anna Stark. Her stepfather, Wilhelm Riedel, died when she was 16. At the age of 16, she moved to the United Kingdom to become a nanny. At the age of 20, she emigrated to the United States, settling in Indiana.

== Career ==
In 1974, DeHaan co-founded the pioneering timeshare company Resort Condominiums International, with her then-husband Jon DeHaan. In 1979, he had a heart attack, and she took over the running of the company. In 1987, they divorced; she was awarded half the company and bought the rest for $67.5 million.

In 1995, she sold RCI for $825 million.

== Philanthropy ==
DeHaan founded and donated $220 million to Christel House International. The nonprofit organization has opened schools in eight cities: Bangalore and Naya Raipur, India; Mexico City, Mexico; Cape Town, South Africa; and Indianapolis. The schools are designed to provide an education to poor children around the world. Christel House announced in July 2017 that a ninth school would open in Jamaica in August 2019.

== Personal life ==
In 1972, she married Jon DeHaan (b. 1940). She had three children and lived in Indianapolis. She died on June 6, 2020, at her home.
