= Magic Holidays =

- Company type: Hotels
- Industry: Hospitality
- Headquarters: Mumbai, India
- Website: www.magicholidays.info//

Magic Holidays is a brand belonging to Panoramic Holidays Ltd. (PHL). PHL is a timeshare company, part of Panoramic Group. It was founded in 2009 to provide holidays on a timeshare basis. Magic Holidays has over 37 hotels & resorts in India and abroad. In 2013, it was reported that the company is working towards building and acquiring additional resorts around the world. Magic Holidays is an affiliate of Resorts Condominium International (RCI), the largest timeshare vacation exchange network in the world. Magic Holidays has access to properties in more than 103 countries.

== History ==
Panoramic Holidays Ltd., (PHL) is a part of the hospitality vertical of the Panoramic Group. Founded in 2009, Magic Holidays currently has over 8387 members (approx. number) and more than 37 hotels & resorts in India and abroad.

== Hotels and resorts in India ==
- United 21 – Thane
- Panoramic Resort – Karnala
- Pancard Club – Pune
- Hotel Sai Sahavas – Shirdi
- Hotel Sagar Kinara – Malvan
- Graciano Cottages – Goa
- United 21 Resort – Mahabaleshwar
- United 21 – Mysore
- United 21 Resort – Kodaikanal
- Panoramic Sea Resort – Alleppey
- United 21 Grassland – Kaziranga
- United 21 Resort – Sunderbans
- United 21 Nature Paradise – Bhimtal
- United 21 Wildlife Resort – Corbett
- United 21 Resort – Chail
- United 21 – Tiger’s Habitat – Kanha
- United 21 – Jungle Resort – Pench
- United 21 – Royal Resort – Todgarh
- United 21 – Hyderabad
- United 21 – Vanvaso – Gir
- United 21 Retreat – Lonavala
- United 21 Island Resort – Kollam
- United 21 Lake City Resort – Udaipur
- United – 21 Emerald – Goa
- United – 21 Beach view – Mandarmoni

== Hotels and resorts abroad ==
- Clarion Inn – Hudson, Ohio – USA
- Baymont Inn & Suites – North Carolina – USA
- The Georgian Resort – New York City – USA
- Econo Lodge – North Carolina – USA
- Regal Palms Resort Development, Orlando, Florida – USA
- Sai Motels – Auckland – New Zealand
- AD Condominium Hyatt – Pattaya – Thailand
- Patong Tower – Phuket – Thailand
- St. Thomas Lodge – Singapore
- Andaman Beach Condominium – Phuket – Thailand
