= Diamond Resorts =

American timeshare company

- Company type: Subsidiary
- Industry: Vacation ownership, timeshare
- Founded: 1992; 34 years ago
- Founder: Stephen J. Cloobeck
- Headquarters: Las Vegas, Nevada, U.S.
- Number of locations: 56 resorts (many slated to be rebranded to Hilton brands)
- Area served: Worldwide
- Key people: Michael Flaskey (CEO)
- Products: Vacation ownership, timeshare
- Revenue: ▲$230.7 million (EBITDA, 2013)
- Parent: Hilton Grand Vacations
- Website: diamondresorts.com

Diamond Resorts is a wholly owned subsidiary of Hilton Grand Vacations. Diamond Resorts was an independent timeshare and vacation ownership company until it was purchased by HGV in 2021. Following the purchase, Diamond's resorts became part of HGV's resort portfolio, and Diamond itself became a brand and subsidiary of HGV. The majority of Diamond Resorts have been or will be rebranded as Hilton Vacation Club properties, however the original brand will continue to exist as some resorts are slated to retain the Diamond Resorts name.

== History ==
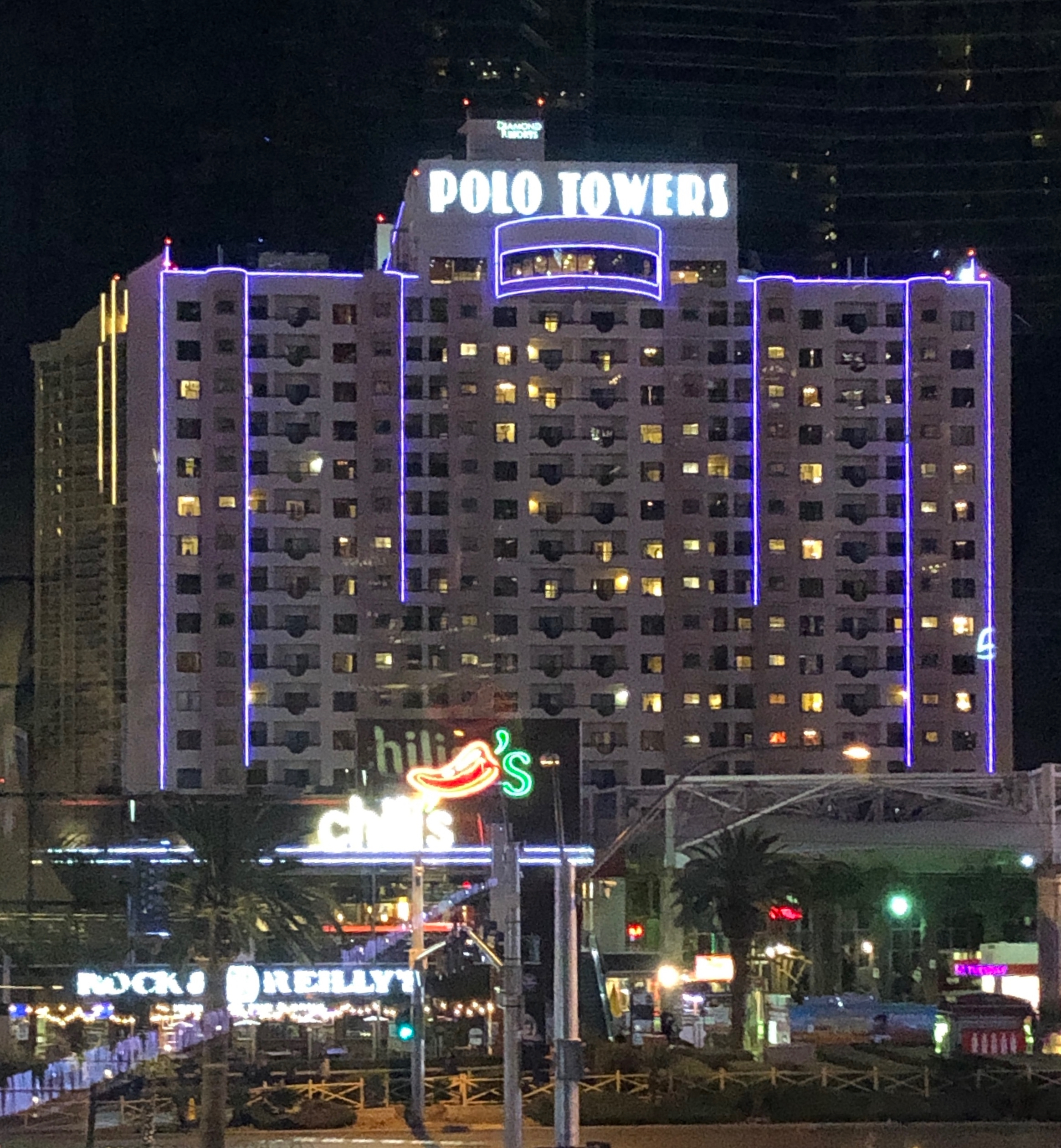
The Polo Towers in Las Vegas, which is owned by Diamond Resorts

Diamond Resorts launched the Diamond Resorts Invitational in 2013 to benefit Florida Hospital for Children. Through the golf tournament, the company has raised a total of more than $3.1 million to the children's hospital. In March 2018, the company announced it was sponsoring a new golf tournament, the Diamond Resorts Tournament of Champions, with the LPGA as an official season event.

In October 2015, DRI bought out Gold Key Resorts for $167.5 million. This acquisition added five vacation ownership resorts in Virginia Beach, Virginia, and one in the Outer Banks, North Carolina. That same month, Diamond Resorts pledged to match all new donations made to the Diamond Resorts International Foundation, a recognized 501(c)(3) organization, in 2017 up to $1 million to support Hurricane Irma relief efforts.

Diamond Resorts acquired Intrawest Resort Club Group in November 2015, adding nine resorts and 22,000 members. After the acquisition, Diamond Resorts re-branded the Intrawest Resort Club Group as Embarc Resorts.

On June 29, 2016, Apollo Global Management made a successful offer to purchase Diamond Resorts International.

On December 23, 2016 Arizona Attorney General Mark Brnovich announced a settlement of $800,000 with Diamond Resorts. As part of the settlement, customers who bought their timeshares under false pretenses could relinquish them.

Michael Flaskey was named chief executive officer of the company in March 2017.

On January 18, 2018, the company underwent a brand refresh, updating its logo and officially dropping International from its name to be known as Diamond Resorts.

Diamond Resorts announced in March 2018 that the company was partnering with the LPGA to launch the Diamond Resorts Tournament of Champions. The tournament begins the LPGA's 2019 season and features tournament winners from the previous two LPGA seasons, along with celebrity participants. The Diamond Resorts Tournament of Champions replaces the golf tournament the company previously sponsored, the Diamond Resorts Invitational. That same month, acquired Amber Vacation Club in March 2018 and will assume operations at Amber's managed resorts, Sunrise Ridge Resort in Pigeon Forge, Tennessee and Alhambra Villas and Alhambra at Poinciana in Kissimmee, Florida.

In April 2018, Diamond Resorts announced it had acquired The Modern Honolulu, a boutique hotel in Honolulu, Hawaii.

In January 2020, Diamond Resorts partnered with Highgate to rent units in two properties in New York City.

In March 2021, Apollo Global agreed to sell Diamond Resorts to Hilton Grand Vacations for $1.4 billion. The acquisition was completed on August 2, 2021.

== Undercover Boss ==
The company's founder, Stephen J. Cloobeck, was featured in the fourth season premiere of the American reality television series Undercover Boss on January 15, 2012, marking the first time the head of a company previously featured in an earlier episode went undercover a second time.

== Properties ==
Property	Location
Bell Rock Inn	Sedona, Arizona
Kohls Ranch Lodge	Payson, Arizona
Los Abrigados Resort & Spa	Sedona, Arizona
PVC at The Roundhouse Resort	Pinetop, Arizona
Varsity Clubs of America - Tucson	Tucson, Arizona
Desert Isle of Palm Springs	Palm Springs, California
Palm Canyon Resort	Palm Springs, California
Rivera Beach Resort	Capistrano Beach, California
Rivera Oaks Resort & Racquet Club	Ramona, California
Rivera Shores Resort	Capistrano Beach, California
The Historic Crags Lodge	Estes Park, Colorado
Alhambra Villas	Kissimmee, Florida
Barefoot'n Resort	Kissimmee, Florida
Bryan's Spanish Cove	Orlando, Florida
Charter Club resort of Naples Bay	Naples, Florida
Cypress Pointe Resort	Orlando, Florida
Grand Beach	Orlando, Florida
Liki Tiki Village	Winter Garden, Florida
Orbit One Vacation Villas	Kissimmee, Florida
Parkway International Resort	Kissimmee, Florida
Polynesian Isles Resort	Kissimmee, Florida
Varsity Clubs of America - South Bend	Mishawaka, Indiana
The Suites at Fall Creek	Branson, Missouri
Villas de Santa Fe	Santa Fe, New Mexico
Beachwoods Resort	Kitty Hawk, North Carolina
Fairway Forest Resort	Sapphire, North Carolina
Sunrise Ridge Resort	Pigeon Forge, Tennessee
Cedar Breaks Lodge & Spa	Brian Head, Utah
Beach Quarters Resort	Virginia Beach, Virginia
Boardwalk Resort and Villas	Virginia Beach, Virginia
Greensprings Vacation resort	Williamsburg, Virginia
Turtle Cay Resort	Virginia Beach, Virginia
Alpine Club	Schladming, Austria
Le Club Mougins	Mougins, France
Royal Regency Paris Vincenness	Paris, France
Palazzo Catalani	Lazio, Italy
Vilar do Golf	Algarve, Portugal
Los Amigos Beach Club	Mijas Costa, Costa del Sol, Spain
Royal Oasis Club at Pueblo Quinta	Benalmádena, Costa del Sol, Spain
Sahara Sunset	Benalmádena, Costa del Sol, Spain
Cromer Country Club	Norfolk, England
Pine Lake Resort	Carnforth, England
The Kenmore Club	Perthshire, Scotland
Thurnham Hall	Lancashire, England
Woodford Bridge Country Club	Devon, England
Wychnor Park Country Club	Staffordshire, England
White Sands Beach Club	Arenal d'en Castell, Menorca
Club Cala Blanca	Mogán, Canary Islands
Club del Carmen	Puerto del Carmen, Canary Islands
Jardines del Sol	Playa Blanca, Canary Islands
Royal Sunset Beach Club	Costa Adeje, Tenerife, Canary Islands
Royal Tenerife Country Club	Golf del Sur, Tenerife, Canary Islands
Santa Barbara Golf and Ocean Club	Golf del Sur, Tenerife, Canary Islands
Sunset Bay Club	Costa Adeje, Tenerife, Canary Islands
Sunset Harbour Club	Costa Adeje, Tenerife, Canary Islands
Sunset View Club	Golf del Sur, Tenerife, Canary Islands

== Criticism and controversy ==
=== Sales tactics ===
Diamond Resorts is notable for high-pressure sales tactics used to close sales and generate fees for consumers. Club members are charged yearly maintenance fees (including management fees), which are set by Diamond Resorts and which the FTC warns are likely to rise every year. Diamond Resorts's official 2014 SEC filing states that club members do not have the right to terminate membership, except in certain areas where consumers are protected by state law. Jeff Weir, a Diamond timeshare owner and journalist covering the timeshare industry, told The New York Times, "In my experience, Diamond is much more ambitious, aggressive and downright nasty in their sales presentations compared to Marriott and Westin. Diamond just has an amazing reputation of being tough on people."

Mike Flaskey, the company's chief executive officer as of 2018, spoke on Fox Business about how the company is shaking up its sales and marketing model to better meet traveler's desires.

=== Legal issues ===
On December 23, 2016, Arizona Attorney General Mark Brnovich announced a settlement of $800,000 with Diamond Resorts over accusations that Diamond Resorts had violated the Arizona Consumer Fraud Act. Of the settlement funds, $650,000 were used for customer restitution. Under the settlement, customers who had purchased timeshares in Arizona between January 1, 2011, and July 23, 2017, could be released from their timeshare, provided they gave a detailed description of deceptive statements or false promises made by Diamond Resorts employees during the sale.

The Attorney General's website states that alleged misrepresentations were related to:

- The amounts maintenance fees could increase annually (in some cases up to 25% each year);
- Consumers' ability to resell timeshares to the public;
- The existence of Diamond buy-back programs;
- Consumers' ability to rent out their timeshares for a profit; and
- Discounts on other travel needs.

— Attorney General Press Release

== Similar programs ==
- Bluegreen Corporation
- Disney Vacation Club
- Hilton Grand Vacations Company
- Marriott Vacation Club International
- Westgate Resorts
- WorldMark by Wyndham
- Wyndham Vacation Resorts Asia-Pacific

== See also ==
- Diamond Resorts Invitational
- Mystic Dunes Golf Club
- Great Wolf Resorts
