= ILG, Inc. =

American timeshare company

- Company type: Public
- Traded as: Nasdaq: ILG
- Industry: Hospitality
- Founded: 1976; 50 years ago
- Defunct: September 1, 2018
- Fate: Acquired by Marriott Vacations Worldwide Corporation
- Headquarters: Miami, Florida U.S.
- Area served: Worldwide
- Number of employees: 5,000 (2012)
- Website: ilg.com

ILG, Inc. is an American timeshare company and a subsidiary of Marriott Vacations Worldwide. It was formerly a subsidiary of the corporation IAC. ILG is the parent company of Interval International, a provider of membership and leisure services to the vacation industry. ILG consists of two operating segments: membership and exchange. ILG's principal business segment offers travel and leisure related products and services to owners of vacation interests and others primarily through various membership programs, as well as related services to resort developer clients. As of December 31, 2012, nearly 2,800 resorts located in over 75 countries participated in Interval's primary exchange network. As of that date, the Membership and Exchange segment had approximately two million members enrolled in its various membership programs including approximately 1.8 million in the Interval Network. The biggest competitors for Interval are RCI, and Platinum Interchange. Interval is the second largest timeshare exchange company after RCI.

Interval International was founded in 1976 in Miami. It was acquired by CUC International in 1992. In 1996, CUC merged with HFS, who owned RCI. Because of antitrust concerns, Interval was sold to Willis Stein & Partners. In 2002, USA Interactive (later renamed IAC), acquired Interval. Interval Leisure Group (later renamed ILG) was spun off of IAC in 2008 as a publicly traded company.

In April 2018, Marriott Vacations Worldwide announced that they would purchase Interval Leisure Group for $4.7 billion, which was completed later that year.
