= Diamond Resorts Invitational =

Coordinates: 28.3991°N 81.5478°W

Tournament information
- Location: Orlando, Florida, U.S.
- Established: 2017
- Course: Tranquilo GC at Four Seasons
- Tour: PGA Tour Champions
- Format: Stroke play - 54 holes (no cut); Modified Stableford
- Prize fund: $750,000
- Month played: January

Tournament record score
- Aggregate: 104 points Woody Austin (2017)

Current champion
- (United States) Scott Parel

Location in the United States
Location in Florida

The Diamond Resorts Invitational was a PGA Tour Champions Challenge Season event and celebrity golf tournament, played at Tranquilo Golf Club at Four Seasons in Orlando, Florida, and benefited Florida Hospital for Children. The tournament began as a celebrity-only tournament in 2013 and in 2017, the tournament was made a PGA Tour Champions Challenge Season event. The 2018 event featured a field of 28 PGA Tour Champions and 4 LPGA Tour professionals, and 50 celebrity amateur golfers. The tournament was a no cut 54-hole event, and used the Modified Stableford scoring system. Over the years, the tournament helped raise more than $3.1 million for Florida Hospital for Children.

In March 2018, tournament sponsor Diamond Resorts announced it was changing the tournament for 2019 to an official LPGA Tour event called the Diamond Resorts Tournament of Champions. The new tournament was the LPGA's 2019 season opener with $1.2 million in prize money. The 26-player pro field included only those LPGA players who had qualified by winning in the previous two seasons. They competed alongside 45 sports and entertainment celebrities.

== History ==
=== 2013 ===
In 2013, PGA Tour professional, Brian Gay, offered to lend his name to the inaugural Diamond Resorts-sponsored golf invitational in an effort to help raise money for Florida Hospital for Children. More than 300 golfers, celebrities and spectators attended the event. The tournament also hosted a celebrity-only golf tournament with a $40,000 purse. PGA Tour professional Nick O'Hern won the Professional Golf Division and retired NFL player Mark Rypien was the celebrity champion.

=== 2014 ===
In its second year, the Diamond Resorts Invitational was held at Isleworth Country Club in Windermere, Florida from December 11–14, 2014. More than 400 people participated in the weekend event, which included a celebrity/amateur golf tournament and private concert by country music artist Colt Ford. PGA Tour professional J. B. Holmes won the PGA Tour Division, shooting a 9-under 63. The celebrity champion was former Atlanta Braves pitcher John Smoltz, who defeated the President of Baseball Operations for the Atlanta Brave, John Hart, in a one-hole playoff, for the first of his three victories in the event (including the successor tournament).

=== 2016 ===
In 2016, the golf event was named Diamond Resorts Invitational benefiting Florida Hospital for Children and was nationally televised on the Golf Channel with an 81-person field, 54-hole celebrity tournament. It was held January 12–17, 2016 at The Golden Bear Club in Windermere, Florida and featured a Stableford scoring format with a $500,000 purse. After three days of play, former professional American tennis player, Mardy Fish, claimed victory. The celebrity lineup included Super Bowl MVPs Jerry Rice, Marcus Allen, Richard Dent and Mark Rypien; Atlanta Braves Hall of Fame pitcher of Greg Maddux, John Smoltz and Tom Glavine; ESPN college football expert and former NFL quarterback Danny Kanell; baseball legends Reggie Jackson, Roger Clemens and Gaylord Perry; and celebrity entertainers Larry The Cable Guy, Jake Owen and Colt Ford.

=== 2017 ===
In 2017, the tournament became a PGA Tour Champions Challenge Season event. It was held Jan. 13-15 at Tranquilo Golf Club at Four Seasons Resort Orlando. It had 27 PGA Tour Champions players, three LPGA players and 48 other amateur celebrity players. The players were organized into threesomes of one professional and two celebrities, and competed side-by-side in a Modified Stableford scoring format for separate purses totaling $1.25 million. PGA Champions Tour player Woody Austin won the professional division and MLB pitcher Mark Mulder won the celebrity division.

=== 2018 ===
The tournament was a PGA Tour Champions Challenge Season event again in 2018 and held Jan. 12-14 at Tranquilo Golf Club at Four Seasons Resort Orlando. The professional field featured 28 PGA Tour Champions players and four LPGA players, including Brittany Lincicome and Brooke Henderson, competing for a $750,000 purse. The celebrity field featured 50 sports and entertainment players competing for their own $500,000 purse. All three days of the tournament were again nationally televised on Golf Channel. Former top-ranked American tennis player Mardy Fish took home the $100,000 first place prize money in the celebrity division, while PGA TOUR Champions standout Scott Parel pocketed $125,000 by winning the professional division after a first hole playoff, his second victory in the event. Fish holds the record at four wins in the tournament, having also won the successor tournament in 2021 and 2023.

== Winners ==
Year	Professional golf division	Celebrity division
2013	Nick O'Hern	Mark Rypien
2014	J. B. Holmes	John Smoltz
2016	–	Mardy Fish
Year	PGA Tour Champions division	Celebrity division
2017	Woody Austin	Mark Mulder
2018	Scott Parel	Mardy Fish (2)
