= Timeshare =

Type of property ownership

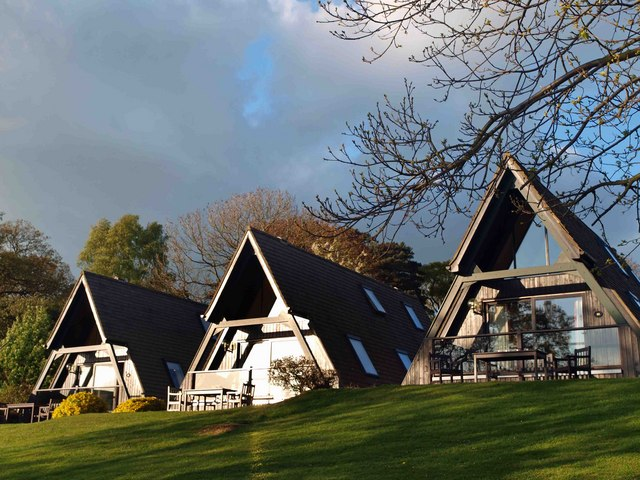
Rutland Hall Hotel timeshare lodges in Rutland, East Midlands, England

A timeshare (sometimes called a vacation ownership or vacation club) is a property with a divided form of ownership or use rights. These properties are typically resort condominium units, in which multiple parties hold rights to use the property, and each owner of the same accommodation is allotted their period of time. Units may be sold as a partial ownership, lease, or "right to use", in which case the latter holds no claim to ownership of the property. The ownership of timeshare programs is varied, and has been changing over the decades. The timeshare market has been subject to criticism.

== History ==
The term "timeshare" was coined in the United Kingdom in the early 1960s, expanding on a vacation system that became popular after World War II. Vacation home sharing, also known as holiday home sharing, involved four European families that would purchase a vacation cottage jointly, each having exclusive use of the property for one of the four seasons. They rotated seasons each year, so each family enjoyed the prime seasons equally. This concept was mostly used by related families because joint ownership requires trust and no property manager was involved. However, not many families vacation for an entire season at a time; so the vacation home sharing properties were often vacant for long periods.

British businesses decided to go one step further and divide a resort room into 1/50th ownership, have two weeks each year for repairs and upgrades, and charge a maintenance fee to each owner. It took almost a decade for timeshares in Europe to evolve into a smoothly run, successful business venture.

The Manhattan Club in Midtown Manhattan, New York City

The first timeshare in the United States was started in 1974 by Caribbean International Corporation (CIC), based in Fort Lauderdale, Florida. It offered what it called a 25-year vacation license rather than ownership. The company owned two resorts that the vacation license holder could alternate their vacation weeks with: one in St. Croix and one in St. Thomas; both in the U.S. Virgin Islands. The Virgin Islands properties began their timeshare sales in 1973. The first urban timeshare was the Manhattan Club, in New York City, which was established in 1996.

Under the contract, CIC promised to maintain and provide the specified accommodation type (a studio, one bedroom, or two bedroom unit) for use by the "license owner" for a period of 25 years (from 1974 to 1999, for example) in the specified season and number of weeks agreed upon, with only two extra charges: a $15.00 per diem (per night) rate, frozen at that cost for the life of the contract, and a $25.00 switching fee, should the licensee decide to use their time at one of the other resorts. The contract was based on the fact that the cost of the license and the per diem, compared with the projected increase in the cost of hotel rates over 25 years to over $100.00 per night, would save the license owner many vacation dollars over the span of the license agreement. Between 1974 and 1999, in the United States, inflation boosted the current cost of the per diem to $52.00, validating the cost savings assumption. The license owner was allowed to rent, or give their week away as a gift in any particular year. The only stipulation was that the $15.00 per diem must be paid every year whether the unit was occupied or not. This "must be paid yearly fee" would become the roots of what is known today as "maintenance fees", once the Florida Real Estate Commission became involved in regulating timeshares.

The timeshare concept in the United States caught the eye of many entrepreneurs due to the enormous profits to be made by selling the same room 52 times to 52 different owners at an average price in 1974–1976 of $3,500.00 per week. Shortly thereafter, the Florida Real Estate Commission stepped in, enacting legislation to regulate Florida timeshares, and make them fee simple ownership transactions. This meant that in addition to the price of the owner's vacation week, a maintenance fee and a homeowners association had to be initiated. This fee simple ownership also spawned timeshare location exchange companies, such as Interval International and RCI, so owners in any given area could exchange their week with owners in other areas.

Cancellations, or rescission, of the timeshare contract, remain the industry's biggest problems to date; the difficulty has been the subject of comedy in popular entertainment.

== Legislation ==
The industry is regulated in all countries where resorts are located. In Europe, it is regulated by European and by national legislation. In 1994, the European Communities adopted "The European Directive 94/47/EC of the European Parliament and Council on the protection of purchasers in respect of certain aspects of contracts relating to the purchase of the right to use immovable properties on a timeshare basis", which was subject to recent review, and resulted in the adoption on January 14, 2009, on European Directive 2008/122/EC.

=== Established regulations in Mexico ===
On May 17, 2010, Mexico's Ministry of Economy through the General Directorate of Standards established new regulations and requirements for developers of timeshare services. The new regulations are outlined in the Official Mexican Norm (NOM), which consists of a series of official standards and regulations applicable to diverse activities in Mexico. The following institutions were involved during the new standardization:

- Mexican Resort Development Association (AMDETUR)
- National Fund for Tourism Development (FONATUR)
- Federal Consumer Protection Office (PROFECO)
- Ministry of Economy (SE)
- Secretary of Tourism (SECTUR)

NOM is officially called: "NOM-029-SCFI-2010, Commercial Practices and Information Requirements for the Rendering of Timeshare Service". It established the following standards:

- Marketing companies are not allowed to offer gifts and solicit for prospective timeshare owners without clearly specifying the real purpose of the offer.
- The requirements to cancel a timeshare contract must be more practical and less burdensome.
- NOM recognizes the privacy rights of timeshare consumers. It is strictly prohibited for the timeshare provider to dispose of the consumer's personal information without written consent.
- Verbal promises must be written and established in the original timeshare contract.
- The timeshare provider must comply with all obligations written in the timeshare contract, as well as the internal rules of the timeshare resort.
- The charges that are intended to be made to the consumer must be plainly and clearly defined on the timeshare application forms, including the membership cost, and all extra fees (maintenance fees/exchange club fees).

To make the new regulations applicable to any person or entity that provides timeshares, the definition of a timeshare service provider was substantially extended and clarified. If the timeshare provider does not follow the rules decreed in NOM, the consequences may be substantial, and may include financial penalties that can range from $50 to $200,000.

== Methods of use ==
Some of the options offered to owners of timeshare contract, but not necessarily all or any for a particular contract:

- Use their usage time
- Rent out their owned usage
- Give it as a gift
- Donate it to a charity (should the charity choose to accept the burden of the associated maintenance payments)
- Exchange internally within the same resort or resort group
- Exchange externally into thousands of other resorts
- Sell it either through traditional or online advertising, or by using a licensed broker. Timeshare contracts allow transfer through sale, but it is rarely accomplished. According to the EU Directive, Long-term holiday ownership products in the EU, which includes timeshare fixed weeks, points and fractional ownerships cannot be sold as resellable assets.

Recently, with some point systems, owners may elect to:

- Assign their usage time to the point system to be exchanged for airline tickets, hotels, travel packages, cruises, amusement park tickets
- Instead of renting all their actual usage time, rent part of their points without actually getting any usage time and use the rest of the points
- Rent more points from either the internal exchange entity or another owner to get a larger unit, more vacation time, or to a better location
- Save or move points from one year to another

Some developers, however, may limit which of these options are available at their respective properties.

Owners can elect to stay at their resort during the prescribed period, which varies depending on the nature of their ownership. In many resorts, they can rent out their week or give it as a gift to friends and family.

=== Exchanging timeshares ===
Used as the basis for attracting mass appeal to purchasing a timeshare, is the idea of owners exchanging their week, either independently or through exchange agencies. The two largest—often mentioned in media—are RCI and Interval International (II), which combined, have over 7,000 resorts. They have resort affiliate programs, and members can only exchange with affiliated resorts. It is most common for a resort to be affiliated with only one of the larger exchange agencies, although resorts with dual affiliations are not uncommon. The timeshare resort one purchases determines which of the exchange companies can be used to make exchanges. RCI and II charge a yearly membership fee, and additional fees for when they find an exchange for a requesting member, and bar members from renting weeks for which they already have exchanged.

Owners can also exchange their weeks or points through independent exchange companies. Owners can exchange without needing the resort to have a formal affiliation agreement with the companies, if the resort of ownership agrees to such arrangements in the original contract.

Due to the promise of exchange, timeshares often sell regardless of the location of their deeded resort. What is not often disclosed is the difference in trading power depending on the location, and season of the ownership. If a resort is in a prime vacation region, it will exchange extremely well depending on the season and week that is assigned to the particular unit trying to make an exchange. However, timeshares in highly desirable locations and high season time slots are the most expensive in the world, subject to demand typical of any heavily trafficked vacation area. An individual who owns a timeshare in the American desert community of Palm Springs, California, in the middle of July or August will possess a much reduced ability to exchange time, because fewer come to a resort at a time when the temperatures are in excess of 110 °F (43 °C).

== Varieties ==
=== Deeded versus right-to-use contracts ===
A major difference in types of vacation ownership is between deeded and right-to-use contracts.

With deeded contracts the use of the resort is usually divided into week-long increments and are sold as real property via fractional ownership. As with any other piece of real estate, the owner may do whatever is desired: use the week, rent it, give it away, leave it to heirs, or sell the week to another prospective buyer. The owner is also liable for an equal portion of the real estate taxes, which usually are collected with condominium maintenance fees. The owner can potentially deduct some property-related expenses, such as real estate taxes from taxable income.

Deeded ownership can be as complex as outright property ownership in that the structure of deeds vary according to local property laws. Leasehold deeds are common and offer ownership for a fixed period of time after which the ownership reverts to the freeholder. Occasionally, leasehold deeds are offered in perpetuity, however many deeds do not convey ownership of the land, but merely the apartment or unit (housing) of the accommodation.

With right-to-use contracts, a purchaser has the right to use the property in accordance with the contract, but at some point the contract ends and all rights revert to the property owner. Thus, a right-to-use contract grants the right to use the resort for a specific number of years. In many countries there are severe limits on foreign property ownership; thus, this is a common method for developing resorts in countries such as Mexico. Care should be taken with this form of ownership as the right to use often takes the form of a club membership or the right to use the reservation system, where the reservation system is owned by a company not in the control of the owners. The right to use may be lost with the demise of the controlling company, because a right to use purchaser's contract is usually only good with the current owner, and if that owner sells the property, the lease holder could be out of luck depending on the structure of the contract, and/or current laws in foreign venues.

=== Fixed-week ownership ===
The formerly common unit of sale is a fixed week; the resort will have a calendar enumerating the weeks roughly starting with the first calendar week of the year. An owner may own a deed to use a unit for a single specified week; for example, week 51 typically includes Christmas. An individual who owns Week 26 at a resort can use only that week in each year.

=== Floating-week ownership ===
Sometimes units are sold as floating weeks, in which a contract specifies the number of weeks held by each owner and from which weeks the owner may select for his stay. An example of this may be a floating summer week, in which the owner may choose any single week during the summer. In such a situation, there is likely to be greater competition during weeks featuring holidays, while lesser competition is likely when schools are still in session. Some floating contracts exclude major holidays so they may be sold as fixed weeks.

=== Rotating or flex-week ownership ===
Some are sold as rotating weeks, commonly referred to as flex weeks. To give owners access to different weeks, the weeks are rotated forward or backward through the calendar, so in year 1 the owner may have use of week 25, then week 26 in year 2, and then week 27 in year 3. Under this method, the assigned week changes according to the rotation rather than the owner’s choice.

=== Points programs ===
A variant form of real estate-based timeshare that combines features of deeded timeshare with right-to-use offerings was developed by Disney Vacation Club (DVC) in 1991. Purchasers of DVC timeshare interests, whom DVC calls members receive a deed conveying an undivided real property interest in a timeshare unit. Each DVC member's property interest is accompanied by an annual allotment of vacation points in proportion to the size of the property interest. DVC's vacation points system is marketed as highly flexible and may be used in different increments for vacation stays at DVC resorts in a variety of accommodations from studios to three-bedroom villas. DVC's vacation points can be exchanged for vacations worldwide in non-Disney resorts, or may be banked into or borrowed from future years.

DVC's deeded/vacation point structure, which has been used at all of its timeshare resorts, has been adopted by other large timeshare developers including the Hilton Grand Vacations Company, the Marriott Vacation Club, the Holiday Inn Club Vacations, the Hyatt Residence Club and Accor in France.

Resort-based points programs are also sold as deeded and as right to use. Points programs annually give the owner a number of points equal to the level of ownership. The owner in a points program can then use these points to make travel arrangements within the resort group. Many points programs are affiliated with large resort groups offering a large selection of options for destination. Many resort point programs provide flexibility from the traditional week stay. Resort point program members, such as WorldMark by Wyndham and Diamond Resorts International, may request from the entire available inventory of the resort group.

A points program member may often request fractional weeks as well as full or multiple week stays. The number of points required to stay at the resort in question will vary based on a points chart. The points chart will allow for factors such as:

- Popularity of the resort
- Size of the accommodations
- Number of nights
- Desirability of the season

== Types and sizes of accommodations ==
Timeshare properties tend to be apartment style accommodations ranging in size from studio units (with room for two), to three and four bedroom units. These larger units can usually accommodate large families. Units normally include fully equipped kitchens with a dining area, dishwasher, televisions, DVD players, etc. It is not uncommon to have washers and dryers in the unit or accessible on the resort property. The kitchen area and amenities will reflect the size of the particular unit in question.

Units are usually listed by how many the unit will sleep and how many the unit will sleep privately. Traditionally, but not exclusively:

- Sleeps 2/2 would normally be a one bedroom or studio
- Sleeps 6/4 would normally be a two bedroom with a sleeper sofa

Timeshares are sold worldwide, and accommodation descriptions vary between properties.

Sleep privately usually refers to the number of guests who will not have to walk through another guest's sleeping area to use a restroom. Timeshare resorts tend to be strict on the number of guests permitted per unit.

Unit size affects the cost and demand at any given resort. The same does not hold true comparing resorts in different locations. A one-bedroom unit in a desirable location may still be more expensive and in higher demand than a two-bedroom accommodation in a resort with less demand. An example of this may be a one-bedroom at a desirable beach resort compared to a two-bedroom unit at a resort located inland from the same beach.

== Sales incentives ==
Timeshare sales staffs often provide incentives, including free or deeply discounted hotel rooms, tickets, and gifts, for the prospective buyer to take a tour of the property.

=== The tour ===
The prospective buyers (or "prospects") are seated in a hospitality room with many tables and chairs to accommodate families. The prospects are assigned a tour guide, who may be a licensed real estate agent. Procedures vary from venue to venue. After a warm-up period and some coffee or snacks, a podium speaker welcomes the prospects to the resort, and shows a promotional video.

The prospects are then invited to take a tour of the property. Depending on the resort's available inventory, the tour will include an accommodation that the tour guide or agent feels will best fit the prospect's family's needs. After the tour, the group returns to the hospitality room for a verbal sales presentation. During the presentation, they are handed the resort exchange book from RCI, Interval International, or whatever exchange company is associated with that particular resort property. The prospects are asked about the places they would like to visit if they were timeshare owners. The rest of the presentation is designed around the responses the prospective buyers give to that question.

If the guide is licensed, the prospect is quoted the retail price of the particular unit that best seemed to fit the prospective buyer's needs. If the tour guide is not a licensed agent, a licensed agent steps in to present the price. If the prospect replies with "no", or "I would like to think about it", the prospect will then be given a new incentive to buy. This incentive will usually be a discounted price presented as only "good today". If again, the reply is "no", or "I would like to think about it", the sales agent asks the prospect to please talk to one of the managers before the prospect leaves.

A sales manager, assistant manager or project director may be called to the table for "T.O.", for "takeover", to find an incentive, usually in the form of a smaller, less expensive unit, or a traded in unit from another owner. A common T.O. tactic is to claim that a lower price is exclusive to a specific buyer. If one incentive doesn't move a prospect to purchase, another will follow shortly, until the prospect has either purchased, convinced the sales crew that they are uninterested, or has left on their own.

=== Cancellation of a timeshare contract ===
Timeshare sales are often high pressure and fast moving. Some people sign a contract, then want to cancel it shortly thereafter.

The U.S. Federal Trade Commission mandates a "cooling-off period" that allows people to cancel some types of purchases without penalty within three days. Additionally, almost all U.S. states have laws that specifically govern cancellation of timeshare contracts. In Florida, a new timeshare owner can cancel the purchase within ten days. The law differs by jurisdiction as to whether out-of-state purchasers are subject to the rescission period of their state of residence, or the rescission period of the state where the timeshare purchase was made.

Another common practice is to have the prospective buyer sign a "cancellation waiver", using it as an excuse to lower the price of the timeshare in exchange for the buyer waiving cancellation rights (or paying a penalty, such as losing 10% of the purchase price, if the sale is cancelled). However, such a waiver is not legally enforceable anywhere in Mexico or the United States.

There are companies that specialize in timeshare cancellation, although some cancellation companies are suspected of fraud.

== Resale market ==
=== Market value ===
A resale value of a timeshare unit varies between the timeshare systems and properties. While it's possible for certain units in certain timeshare systems to appreciate in value over time, this is a rather rare event. Most properties in most timeshare systems are worth a fraction of the original price after the purchase, and often carry no value at all.

Deeds with severe restrictions on resale are typically given out for free. For example, upon resale of most Holiday Inn Club Vacations properties, the new owner can no longer use the allotted point value to make reservations at any HICV resort. They are limited to their home resort only, and booking window is shorter.

Deeds with no resale restrictions may carry some resale value, depending on the location, season, unit size, or the allotted points value. For example, large units in mountain resorts during ski season and large penthouse units in popular destinations will have some resale value. Conversely, small units in destinations saturated by timeshares, or with expensive maintenance fees compared to the value of offered points in their respective system, will have no resale value at all.

=== Right of first refusal ===
Most timeshare companies retain the right of first refusal (ROFR) for most of their properties. If that is a case, each owner is required to submit their purchase agreement contract to the developer and ask for a waiver. The developer may decide to exercise ROFR to purchase the subject property, thus refusing the sale to the original buyer. A transaction is typically exempted from ROFR if the purchaser is a direct family member.

Even though resales come at a fraction of original costs, developers are often reluctant to exercise the ROFR. Many sought-after deeds change hands uninterrupted. When a developer exercises the ROFR, they become the owner and must pay the same maintenance fees and property taxes to the resort's HOA, so they must maintain a healthy balance between inventory ready for sale and maintenance costs.

==== List of timeshare systems with right of first refusal on resales ====
- Disney Vacation Club
- Hilton Grand Vacations (excluding HGV at the Flamingo, and all affiliate resorts)
- Marriott Vacation Club

== Criticism ==
The United States Federal Trade Commission provides consumers with information regarding timeshare pricing and other related information. Also known as Universal Lease Programs (ULPs), timeshares are considered to be securities under federal law.

Many timeshare owners complain about the annual maintenance fee being too high.

Timeshare developers contend that pricing compared to staying at hotels in the long term is projected to be lower to the timeshare owner. However, hotel guests do not have monthly vacation mortgage payments, upfront costs, fixed schedules, maintenance fees, and preset vacation locations. Many owners also complain that the increasing cost of timeshares and accompanying maintenance and exchange fees are rising faster than hotel rates in the same areas.

The industry's reputation has been severely injured by the comparison of the timeshare salesman to the used car salesman, because of the sales pressure put on the prospective buyer to "buy today". "The discounted price I quoted you is only good if you buy today", is the industry standard's pitch to close the sale on the first visit to the resort. Many have left a timeshare tour complaining of being exhausted by the barrage of salespeople they had to deal with before they finally exited the tour. The term "TO", or "turn over" man, was coined in the land industry, and quickly evolved to the timeshare industry. Once the original tour guide or salesman gives the prospective buyer the pitch and price, the "TO" is sent in to drop the price and secure the down payment.

Exiting a timeshare without the cooperation of the developer is not easy, and often requires the assistance of a specialist. This specialist may be a broker who works both sides of the market, or an attorney who can litigate the contract. While some timeshare exit specialists are legitimate, the business is plagued by scammers who cold-call owners and solicit payment in advance for nonexistent services. The original buyer of a timeshare generally takes a substantial loss when a timeshare is successfully resold. In 2017, Spanish police arrested 35 people in connection with a fraudulent timeshare resale operation on the Costa del Sol that had taken an estimated £11m profit from 500 victims.

In Vietnam, the timeshare model has been 'booming' and is related to scams. Though Vietnamese authorities and mass media have constantly warned people to avoid timeshare scams, many people still buy under the false promise of 'owning the right for vacations and the possibility of high profit investment'. In mid-June 2026, Vietnam Television aired a 3-part investigative reporting series named Bẫy 2 - Cạm bẫy từ các hợp đồng kỳ nghỉ (in English, lit.: Trap 2 - Timesharing trap) during the VTV Đặc biệt (in English: VTV Special) program line-up. The reporters exposed the tricks that various salesmen and saleswomen used to target people, especially seniors, to buy timesharing contracts and continue to buy further contracts under the guise of "contract reselling protocol", letting the victims ran out of money. In return, salesmen/saleswomen can have up to a 40 percent share of each contract. After airing the exposé via VTV1, the station flagship channel, people have expressed anger toward the immoral salesmen/saleswomen and called for sympathy for the victims. Vietnamese press has also re-focused on the timesharing scam issue after the airing of the exposé, calling for the attention of the public and local authorities. On 18th June 2026, the Hanoi Police Department announced they had investigated the timesharing scam for about a year after receiving various Letters of Accusation from people since 2025, successfully busting 201 accused and 27 companies involved. On the same day, the Ho Chi Minh City Police Department announced that they busted around 200 accused and 11 companies participating in a timesharing scam. As of July 2026, Vietnamese police are seeking full recovery for those who lost money.

== See also ==
- List of timeshare companies
- List of house types
- All-inclusive resort
- Fractional financing
- Timeshare donation
- Vacation rental
