= Conservatory (greenhouse) =

Greenhouse for the public display of plants

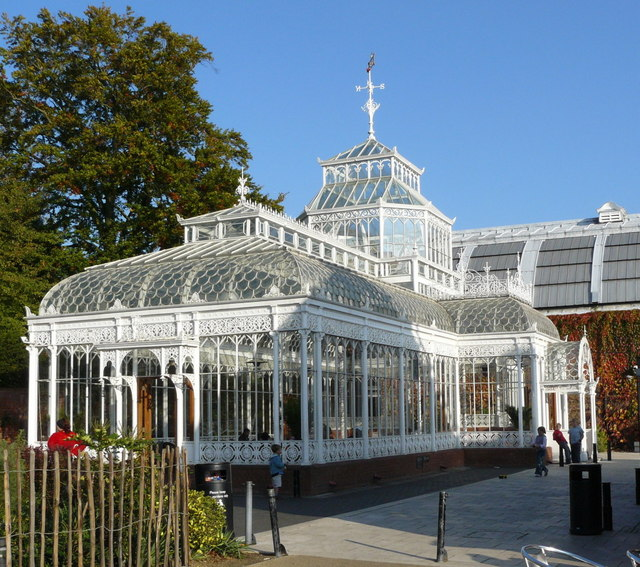
A traditional conservatory at the Horniman Museum in London, now used as a café.

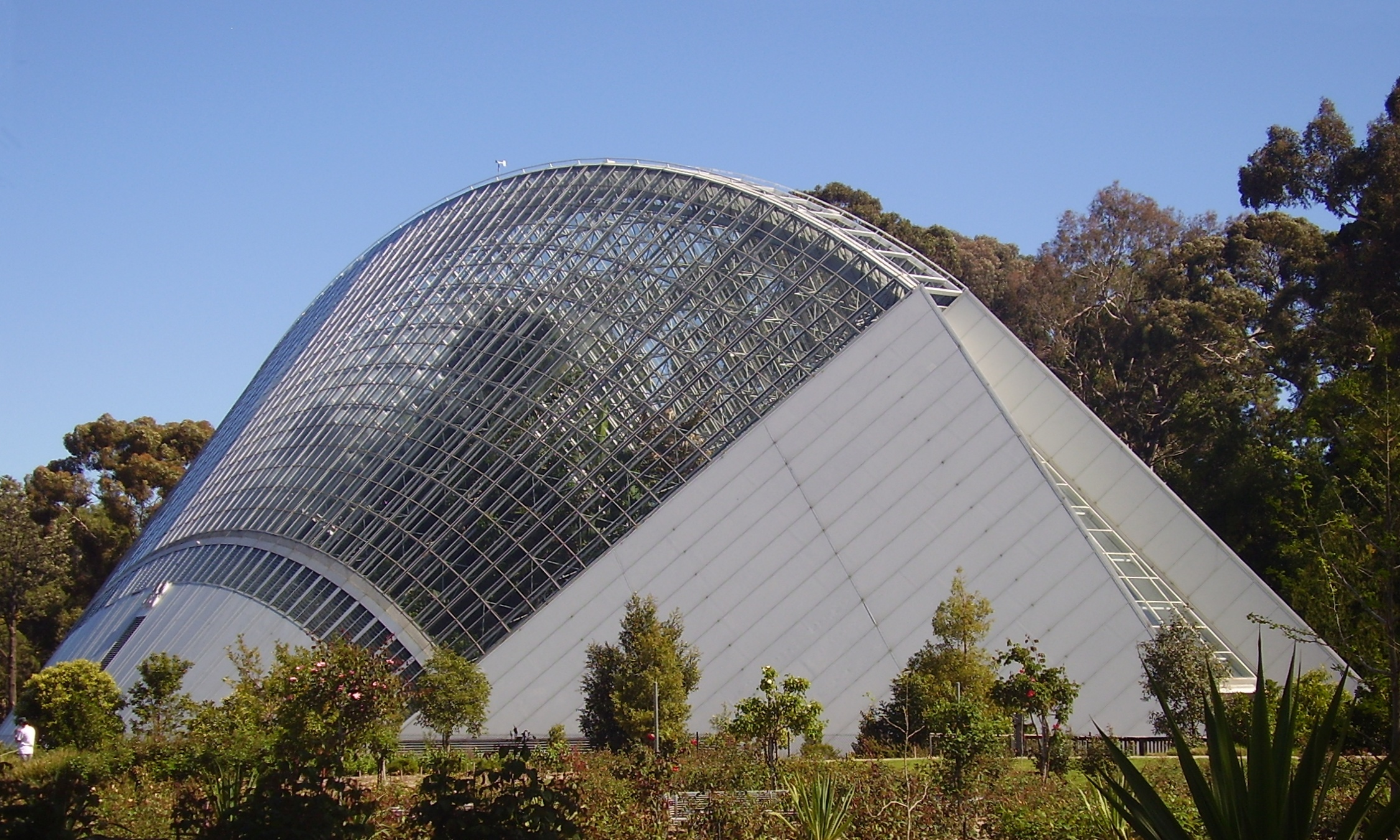
A modern implementation, Adelaide Botanic Garden's Bicentennial Conservatory

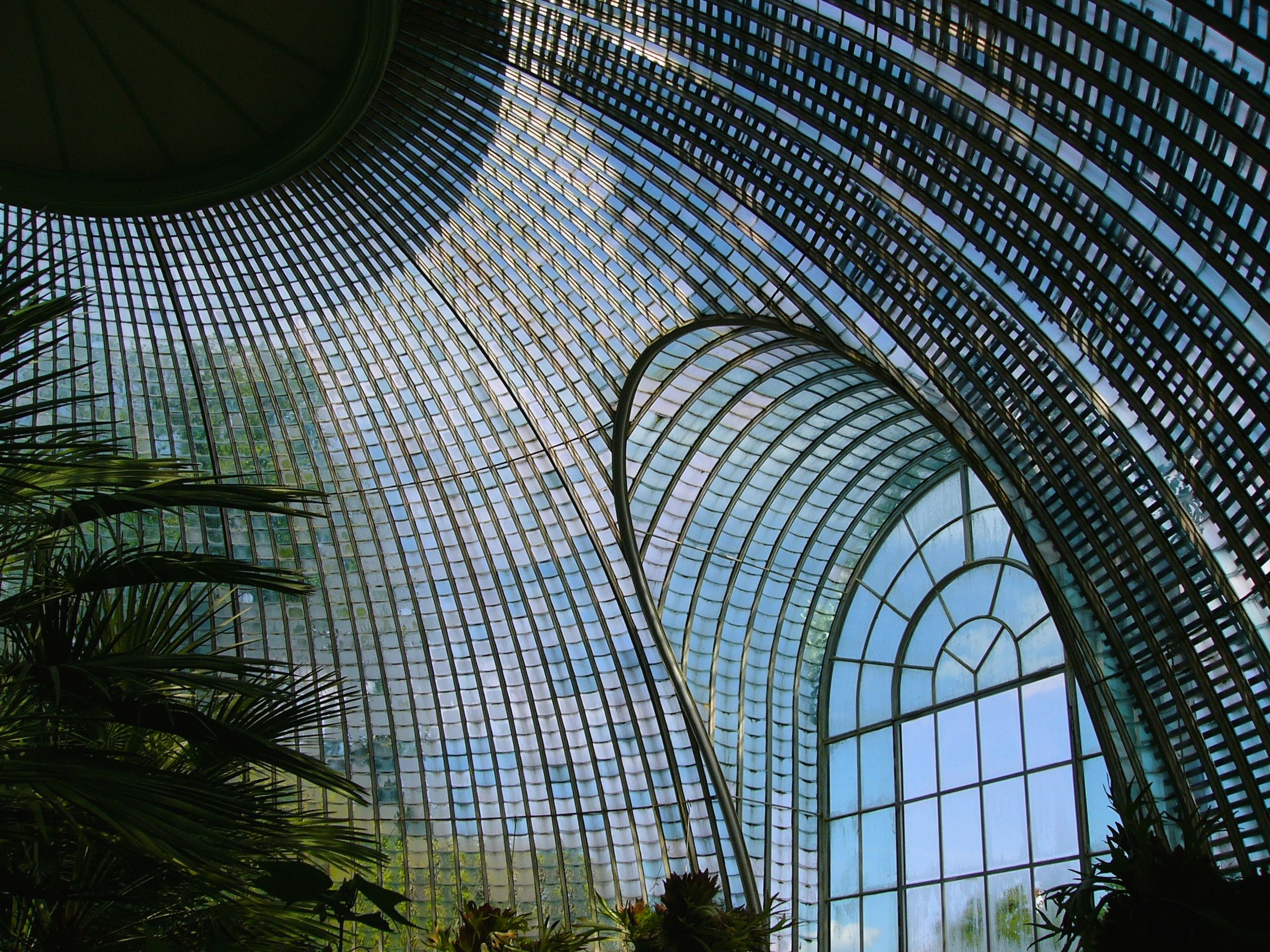
Conservatory interior in the Lednice–Valtice Cultural Landscape, Czechia

A conservatory is a building or room having glass or other transparent roofing and walls, used as a greenhouse or a sunroom. Usually it refers to a space attached to a conventional building such as a house, especially in the United Kingdom. Elsewhere, especially in America, it can often refer to a large freestanding glass-walled building in a botanic garden or park, sometimes also called a palm house if tall enough for trees. Municipal conservatories became popular in the early 19th century.

== Description ==
Many cities, especially those in cold climates and with large European populations, have built municipal conservatories to display tropical plants and hold flower displays. This type of conservatory was popular in the early nineteenth century, and by the end of the century people were also giving them a social use (e.g., tea parties). Conservatory architecture varies from typical Victorian glasshouses to modern styles, such as geodesic domes. Many were large and impressive structures and are included in the list below.

In the UK, the legal definition of a conservatory is a building that has at least 50% of its side wall area glazed and at least 75% of its roof glazed with translucent materials, either polycarbonate sheeting or glass. Today, the terms sunroom, solarium and conservatory are used interchangeably by the public, but in general the term conservatory and particularly English conservatory evoke the image of an ornate structure, echoing the traditions of that Victorian era of conservatory building. Modern conservatories tend also to be graced with a traditional cresting and finial, along with single, double patio or even bi-folding doors.

These structures have been designed and built around the world, in private gardens, parks, and botanical institutions. Smaller garden conservatories have become popular, which may be dual-function, equally devoted to horticulture and recreation, or favor the latter, as a solarium or sunroom.

== History ==
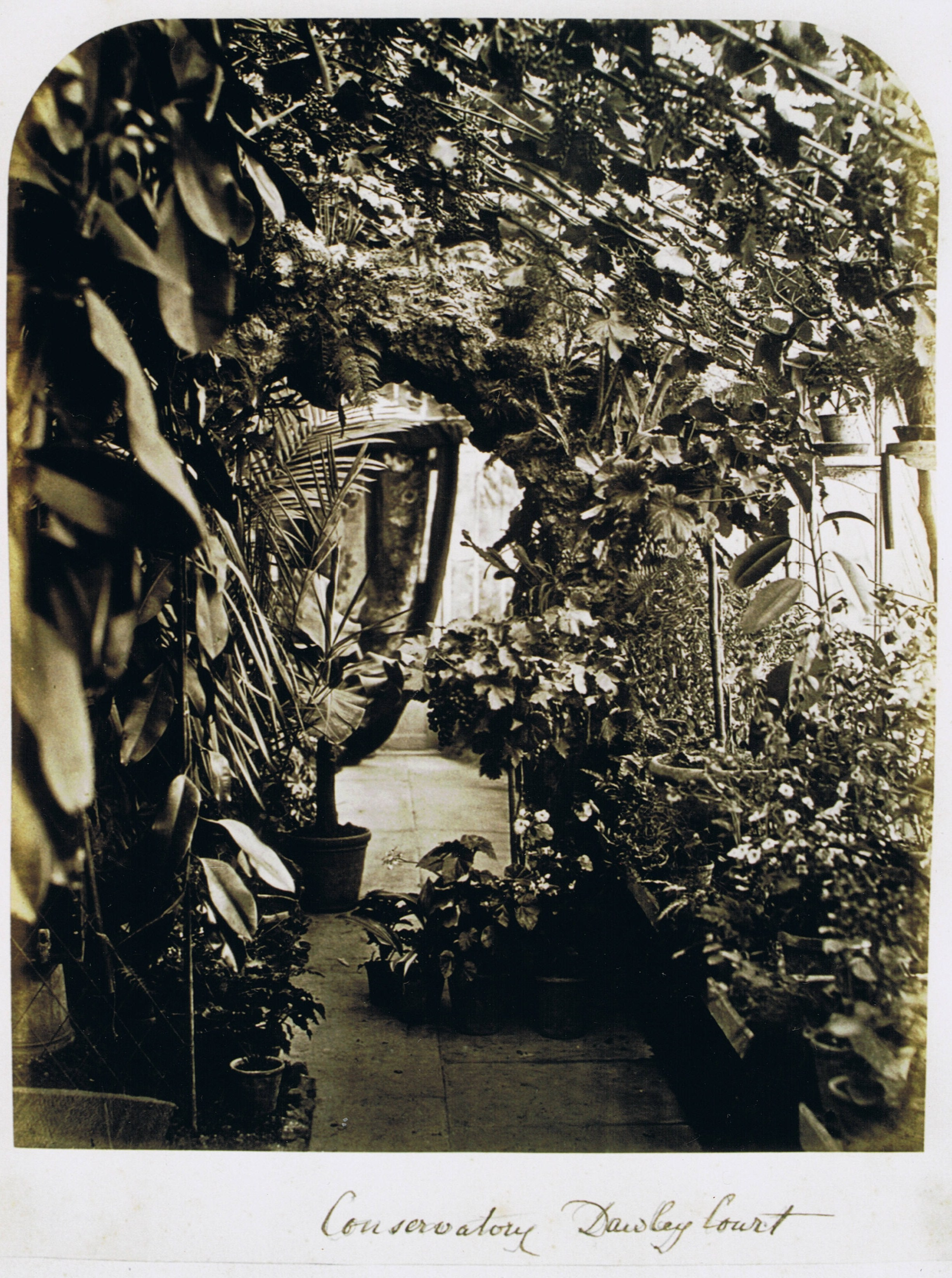
An English conservatory, Dawley Court, near Hillingdon, Middlesex, photographed circa 1870

Conservatories originated in the 16th century when wealthy landowners sought to cultivate citrus fruits such as lemons and oranges that began to appear on their dinner tables brought by traders from warmer regions of the Mediterranean. Preservation of citrus and other tender plants started out as crudely as building a pergola over potted plants or beds, or simply moving potted plants indoors for the cold season. Known in Italy as limonaia, these early structures employed wood panels or open galleries to protect from the cold.

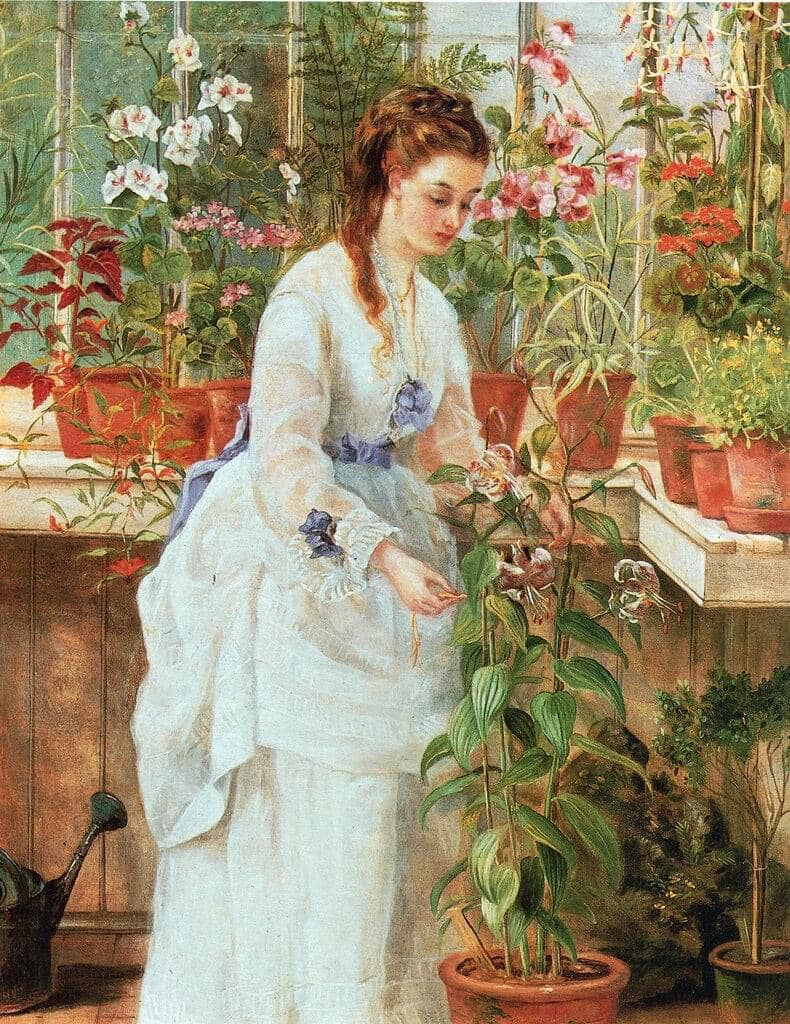
Jane Maria Bowkett, 'Young Lady in a Conservatory', 1870-1880

Further north in Europe, the preservation of orange trees became the trend with special-purpose buildings built to protect the delicate fruit. Orangeries, as they came to be called, were typically enclosed structures built with wood, brick or stone with tall vertical windows on the south walls. The citrus trees were typically in huge pots or tubs, and wheeled outside for the summer months, as at the Gardens of Versailles. Use of these rooms expanded socially and practically, being used to entertain and to host a wider variety of plants. The term greenhouse came to describe the rooms and conservatories for tender plants. In the 18th century, sloped glass began to be used in conservatory design to allow more light into the structure, enhancing conditions for plant growth. This innovation may have been influenced by the work of Dutch scientist Jan Ingenhousz, who studied the role of light in photosynthesis. However, while his research likely contributed to advancements in horticultural practices, it is not definitively known if he directly influenced the adoption of sloping glass for conservatories.

The 19th century was the golden age of conservatory building, primarily in England. English conservatories were the product of English love of gardening and new technology in glass and heating. Many of the magnificent public conservatories, built of iron and glass, are the result of this era. Kew Gardens in London is an example of a large greenhouse used for growing tender and rare plants, or, less often, for birds and rare animals – sometimes with the plants and animals living together. Other examples include the Great Palm House at Kew Gardens that was built in 1844, built by Decimus Burton and the Crystal Palace, built for London's Great Exhibition of 1851 by Sir Joseph Paxton.

The widespread construction of UK conservatories came to a halt with the onset of World War II. While the advent of insulated glass in the 1950s and 1960s saw the development of simple sunroom structures, it was not until the 1970s that creative architects and builders began to recreate the Victorian styling of 19th-century English conservatories in smaller domestic versions using insulated glass. In contemporary construction, a conservatory differs from an orangery in having more than 75% of its roof surface made from glass. Frame and roof materials include aluminium, PVCu and timber. A conservatory by definition must have more than 50% of its wall surface glazed. Contemporary conservatories use a number of technologies to ensure glass is as energy efficient as possible, ensuring it lets in the maximum light possible while maintaining a steady temperature throughout summer and winter. Technologies include argon-filled glazing units, easy clean coatings, heat reflective film, thermal ribbons or thermal breaks – hollow sections of glass that intercept heat. The latest glass technologies involve self-tinting glass that darkens as heat builds up during a summer's day and then lightens as the surface temperature of the glass cools later in the day.

== Gallery ==
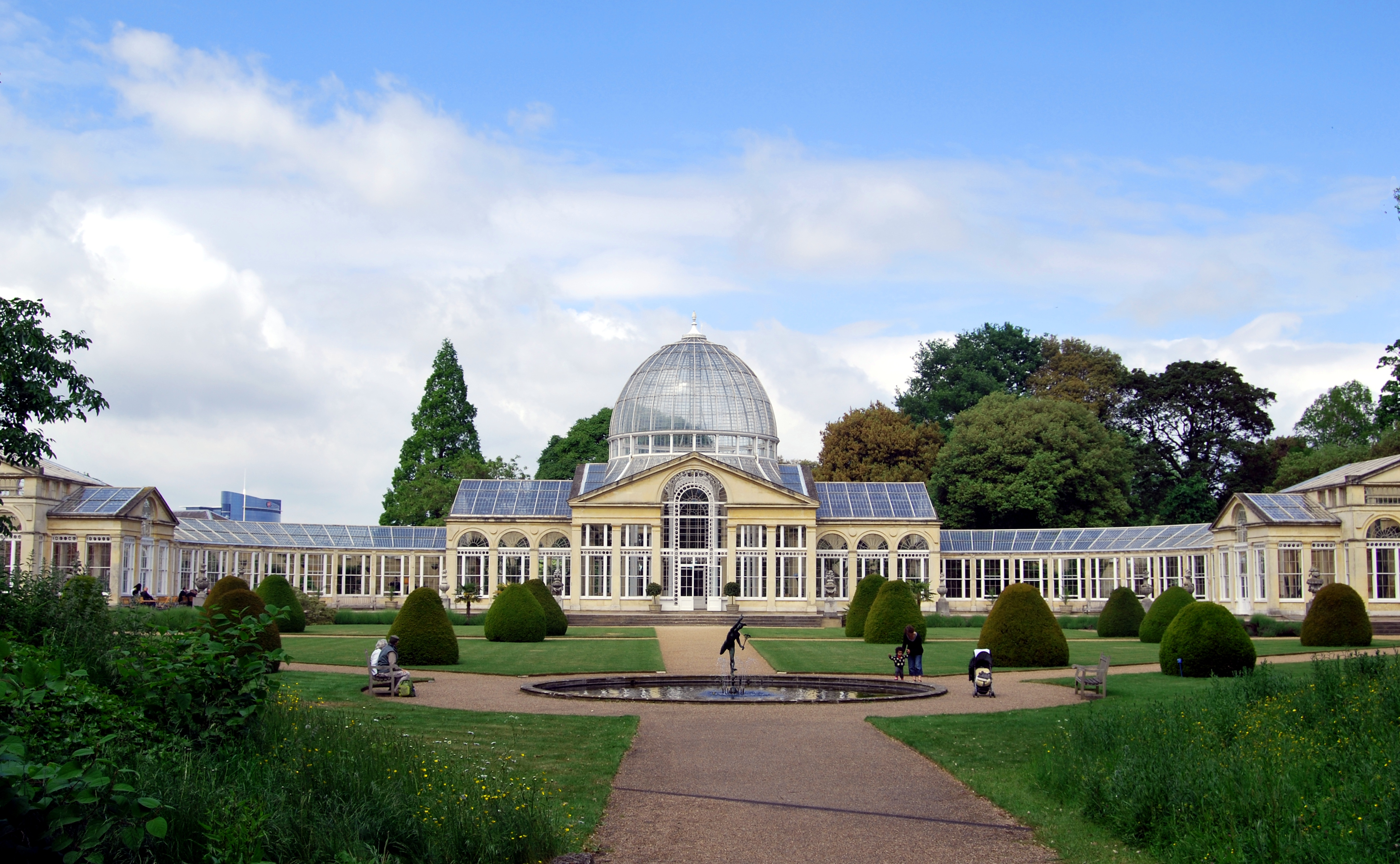
Syon House Grand Conservatory, Brentford, London

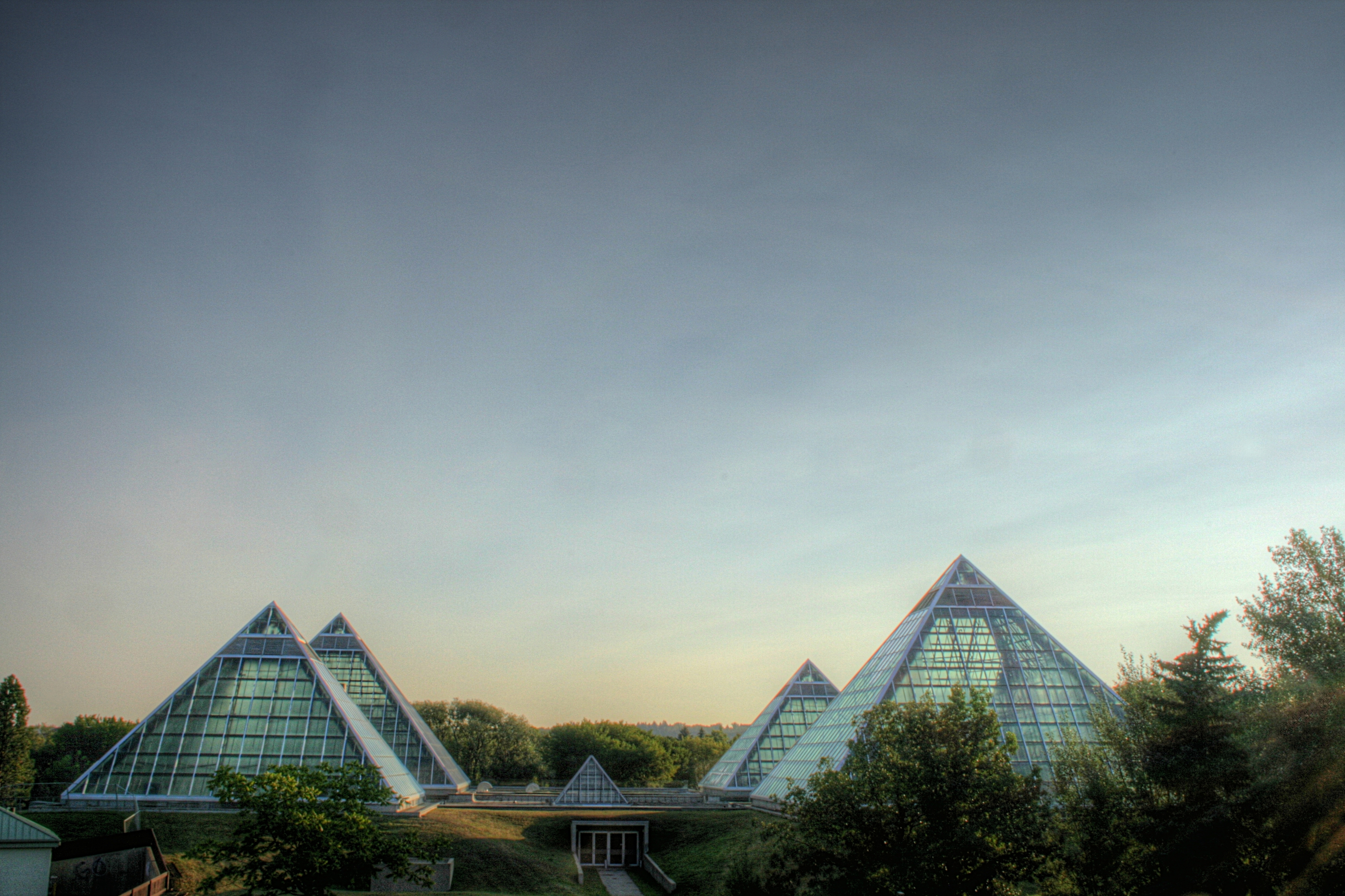
Dawn at the Muttart Conservatory in Edmonton, Alberta, Canada.

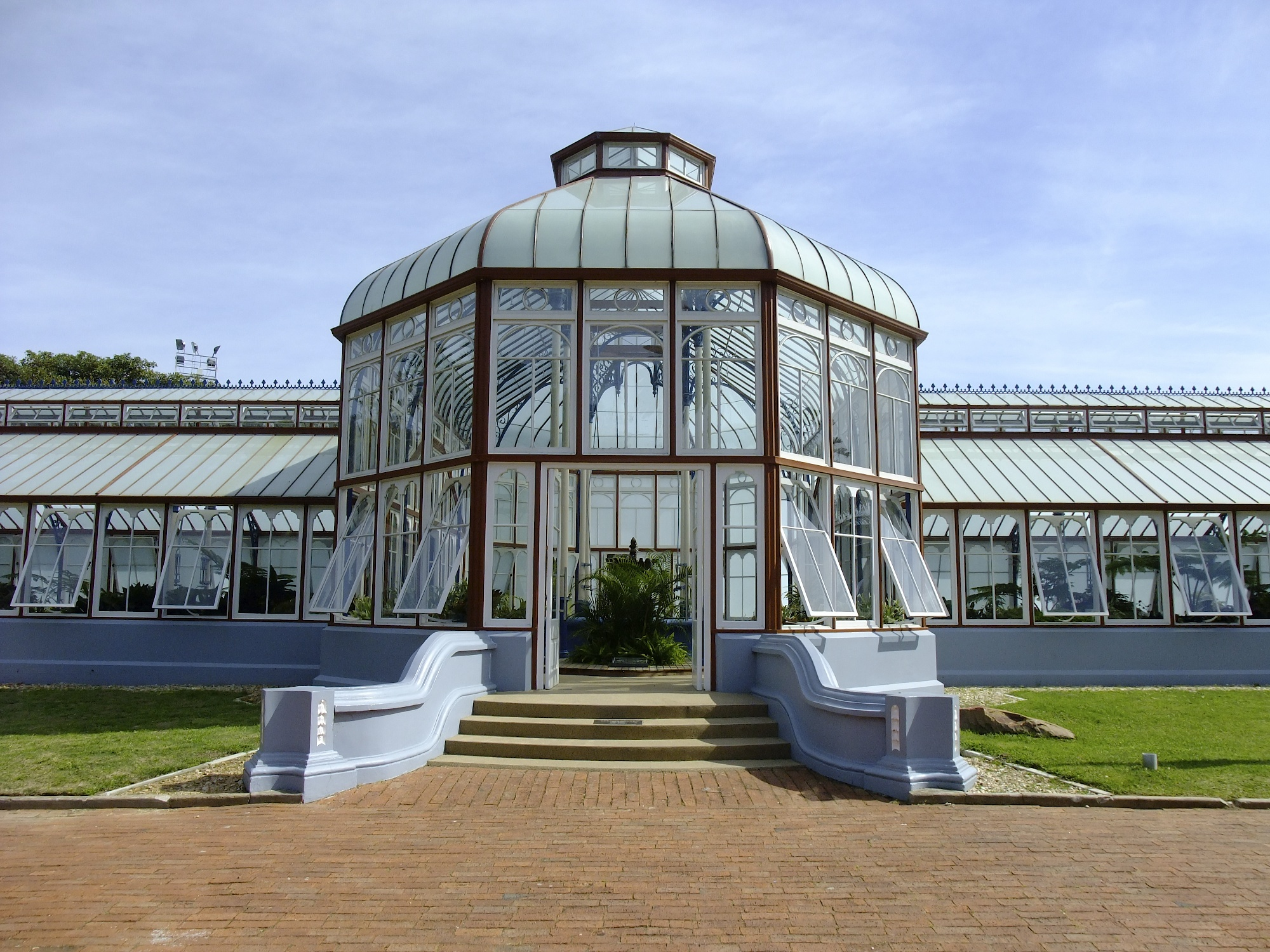
Pearson Conservatory, Port Elizabeth, South Africa

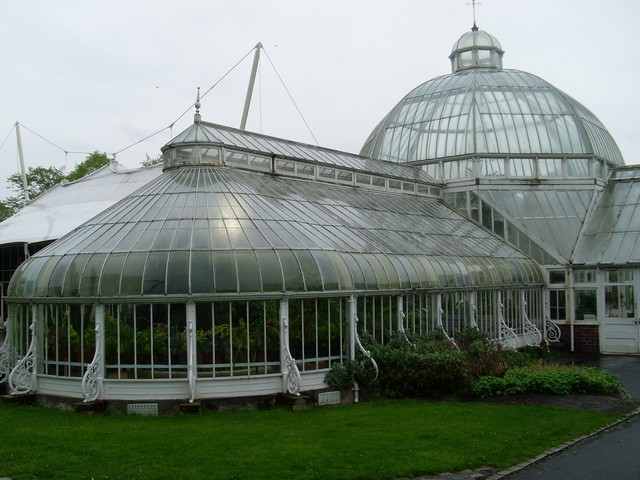
The Tollcross Winter Gardens, Scotland

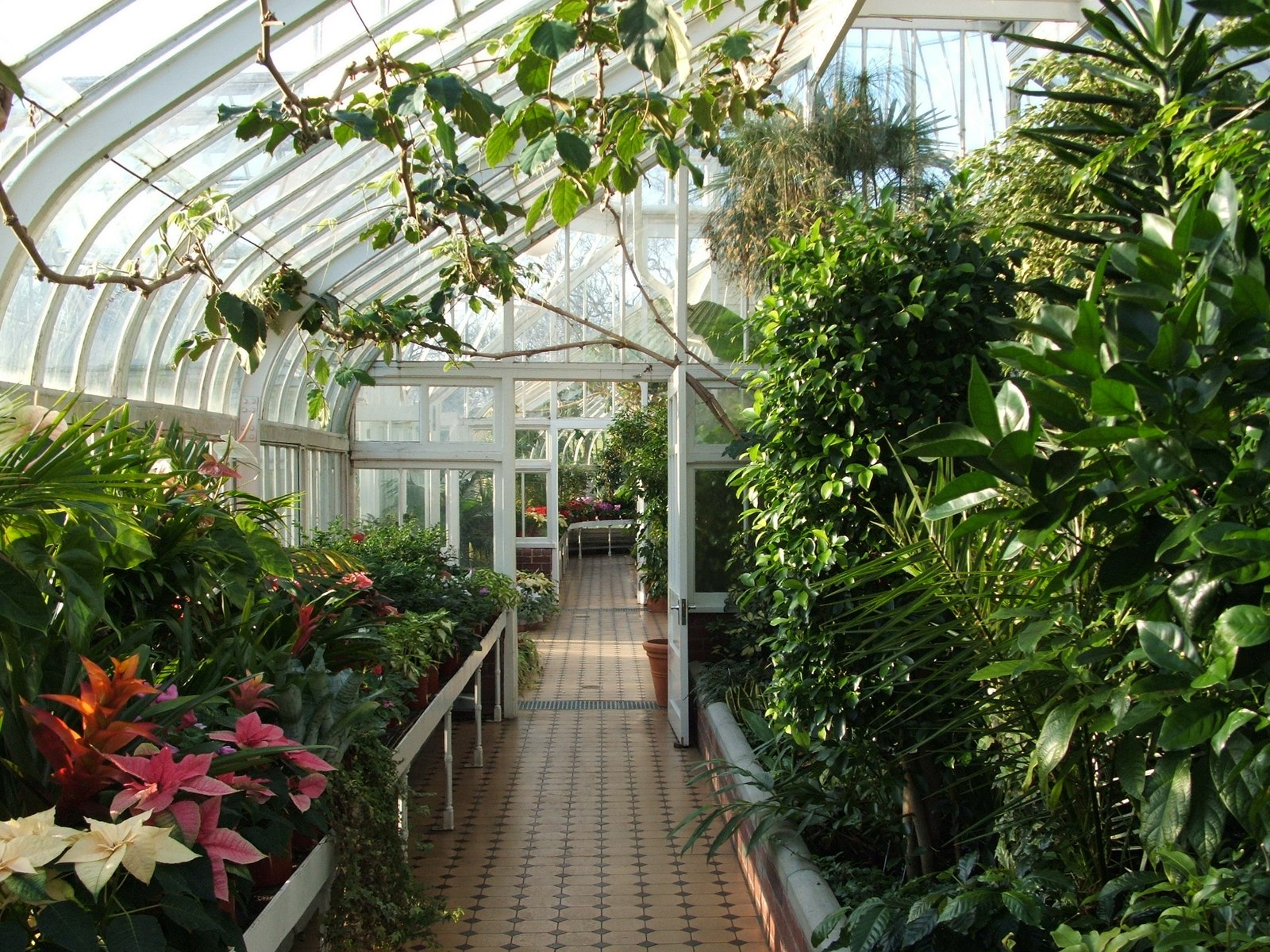
Inside the Tollcross Winter Gardens

== List of prominent conservatories ==
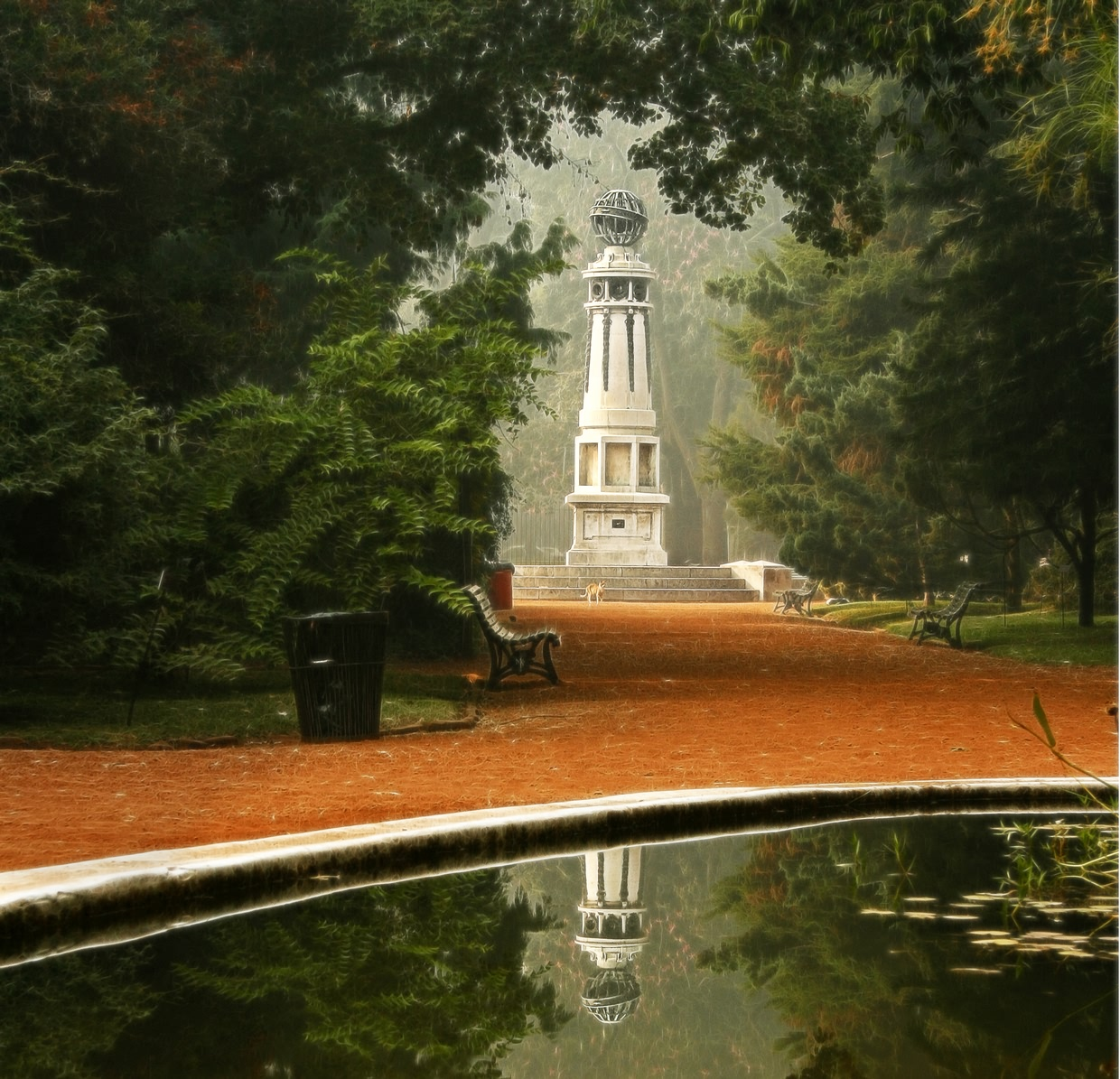
Buenos Aires Botanical Garden

=== Argentina ===
- Buenos Aires Botanical Garden
- Lucien Hauman Botanical Garden
- Botanical Garden of the Municipality of Córdoba
- La Plata Botanical Garden
- Pillahuincó Botanical Garden
- Alberto Roth Botanical Garden of Posadas
- Oro Verde Botanical Garden
- Dr. Miguel J. Culaciati Botanical Garden
- Aníbal Oscar Carnevalini Botanical Garden
- Arturo E. Ragonese Botanical Garden
- Cascada Escondida Botanical Garden
- Botanical Garden of the Arid Patagonia

=== Australia ===
- Ballarat Botanical Gardens
- Bicentennial Conservatory at Adelaide Botanic Garden
- Fitzroy Gardens, Melbourne

=== Austria ===
- Palmenhaus Schönbrunn

=== Belgium ===
- Royal Greenhouses of Laeken

=== Canada ===
- Muttart Conservatory (Edmonton, Alberta)
- Bloedel Floral Conservatory (Vancouver, B.C.)
- Allan Gardens (Toronto, Ontario)
- Centennial Park Conservatory (Toronto, Ontario)
- Assiniboine Park Conservatory (Winnipeg, Manitoba)

=== China ===
- Beijing Botanical Garden (Beijing)
- Shanghai Botanical Garden (Shanghai)
- South China Botanical Garden (Qingyang, Guangzhou)

=== Denmark ===
- Copenhagen Botanical Gardens

=== Germany ===
- Botanical Gardens and Botanical Museum, Berlin

=== United Kingdom ===
==== England ====
- Kew Gardens (southwest London)
- Chatsworth House (Derbyshire)
- Eden Project (Cornwall)
- Syon House (west London)
- Barbican Conservatory (central London)
- Anthaeum, Hove: built in 1830 with the world's largest dome, it collapsed on its opening day in 1833.

==== Northern Ireland ====
- Belfast Botanic Gardens

==== Scotland ====
- Royal Botanic Garden, Edinburgh
- Kibble Palace
- The Tollcross Winter Gardens, Glasgow
- Springburn Winter Gardens

=== South Africa ===
- Pearson Conservatory, Port Elizabeth
- The Botanical Society Conservatory, Kirstenbosch National Botanical Garden, Cape Town

=== Spain ===
- Palacio de Cristal del Retiro

=== Sweden ===
- Fjärilshuset, Stockholm

=== United States ===
- Amazon Spheres (Seattle, Washington)
- Anna Scripps Whitcomb Conservatory (Detroit, Michigan)
- Biosphere 2 (Oracle, Arizona)
- Birmingham Botanical Gardens (Birmingham, Alabama)
- Bolz Conservatory (Madison, Wisconsin)
- Buffalo and Erie County Botanical Gardens (Buffalo, New York)
- Cecil B. Day Butterfly Center (Pine Mountain, Georgia)
- Climatron (St. Louis)
- Conservatory of Flowers (San Francisco, California)
- Desert Dome at the Henry Doorly Zoo and Aquarium (Omaha, Nebraska)
- Desert Garden Conservatory (San Marino, California)
- Denver Botanic Gardens (Denver, Colorado)
- Eleanor Armstrong Smith Glasshouse (Cleveland, OH)
- Enid Haupt Conservatory at New York Botanical Garden (New York)
- Foellinger-Freimann Botanical Conservatory (Fort Wayne)
- Fort Worth Botanic Garden (Fort Worth, Texas)
- Franklin Park Conservatory (Columbus, Ohio)
- Garfield Park Conservatory (Chicago, Illinois)
- Garfield Park Conservatory and Sunken Gardens (Indianapolis)
- Greater Des Moines Botanical Garden (Des Moines)
- Howard Peters Rawlings Conservatory and Botanic Gardens of Baltimore (Baltimore)
- The Huntington Library, Art Museum, and Botanical Gardens (San Marino, California)
- Krohn Conservatory (Cincinnati)
- Lamberton Conservatory at Highland Park (Rochester, New York)
- Lena Meijer Conservatory at Frederik Meijer Gardens & Sculpture Park (Grand Rapids, Michigan)
- Lewis Ginter Botanical Garden Conservatory (Richmond, Virginia)
- Lincoln Park Conservatory (Chicago)
- Longwood Gardens (Kennett Square, Pennsylvania)
- Marjorie McNeely Conservatory at Como Park (St. Paul)
- Mitchell Park Horticultural Conservatory (Milwaukee)
- Moody Gardens (Galveston)
- Myriad Botanical Gardens and Crystal Bridge Conservatory (Oklahoma City)
- Phipps Conservatory & Botanical Gardens (Pittsburgh)
- Steinhardt Conservatory (Brooklyn)
- Reiman Gardens (Ames, Iowa)
- United States Botanic Garden (Washington, D.C.)
- Volunteer Park Conservatory (Seattle, Washington)
- W. W. Seymour Botanical Conservatory (Tacoma, Washington)

=== India ===
- Lalbagh Botanical Garden (Bengaluru, India)

== See also ==
- Roof lantern
- Tessellated roof
