= Days Inn China =

Chinese hotel chain

Days Inn China 美国戴斯酒店集团
- Type: Private
- Industry: Hotel
- Headquarters: Beijing, China
- Key people: Harry Tan (ex Chairman & CEO); David Tan (ex Deputy CEO); Ted Fang (ex President)
- Parent: Frontier Group
- Website: www.daysinnhotels.cn

Days Inn China (Chinese: 美国戴斯酒店集团; pinyin: Měiguó Dàisī Jiǔdiàn Jítuán) is the registered trademark of Days Inns Worldwide for Greater China market. Established in 2004, Days Inn China is one of the fastest growing hotel chains in China today, with hotel franchise and management agreements in more than 80 cities. Days Inn China master franchise is held and managed by Wyndham Group USA

== History ==
In mid-2003, Harry Tan (陈嘉财; Chén Jiācái) and his two brothers, David Tan (陈嘉寿; Chén Jiāshòu) and Ted Fang (方庆文; Fāng Qìngwén) started Frontier Group which was backed by Tera Capital to acquired the master franchise of Days Inn for Greater China. They felt that there was a lack of mid-tier or economy hotels in China. Most of the hotels were either luxury or budget hotels. There was also a growing affluence in China's middle class. With that in mind, they got in touch with Cendant Corporation (now known as Wyndham Worldwide) and managed to secure the master franchise for Greater China. Since inception in 2004, Days Inn China has become one of the fastest-growing mid-tier hotel chains in China, with a total of 140 projects and more than 20,000 rooms spanning 80 cities and 22 provinces across China by the end of 2013.

Traditionally an economy brand, Days Inn China has upgraded the brand image and market placement in China with a range of hotel brands.

- Days Hotel & Suites - 5-stars luxury hotels and holiday resorts
- Days Hotel - superior 4-stars hotels
- Days Inn Business Place - full-service business hotels
- Days Inn - 3-star city hotels
- Days Suites - superior hotel style, service apartments

== See also ==
- Days Inns – Canada
