= Cecil B. Day Butterfly Center =

Butterfly conservatory

Coordinates: 32°49′54.12″N 84°51′14.4″W

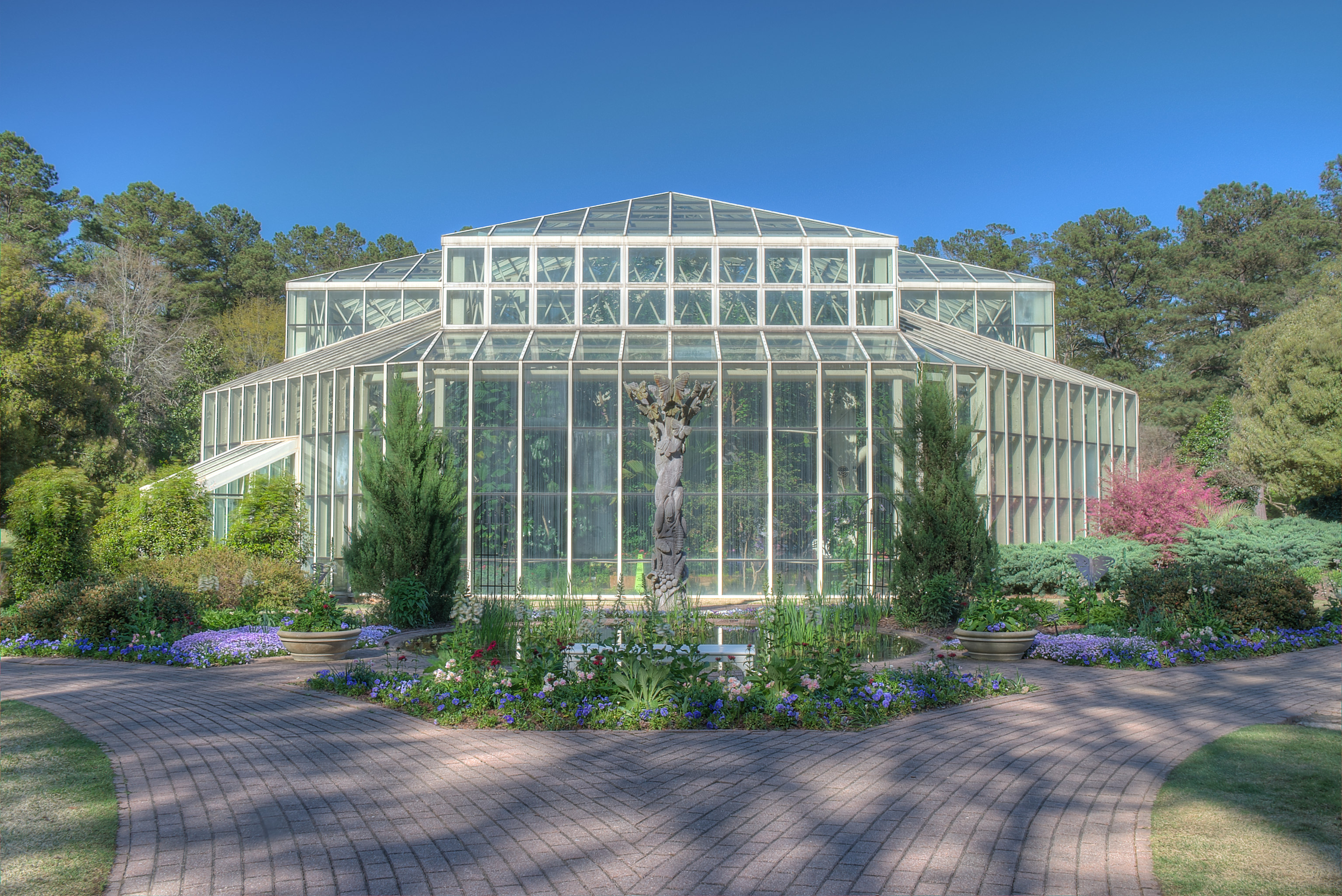
Day butterfly center

The Cecil B. Day Butterfly Center is located at Callaway Gardens in Pine Mountain, Georgia. It is North America's largest glass-enclosed tropical conservatory.

== History ==
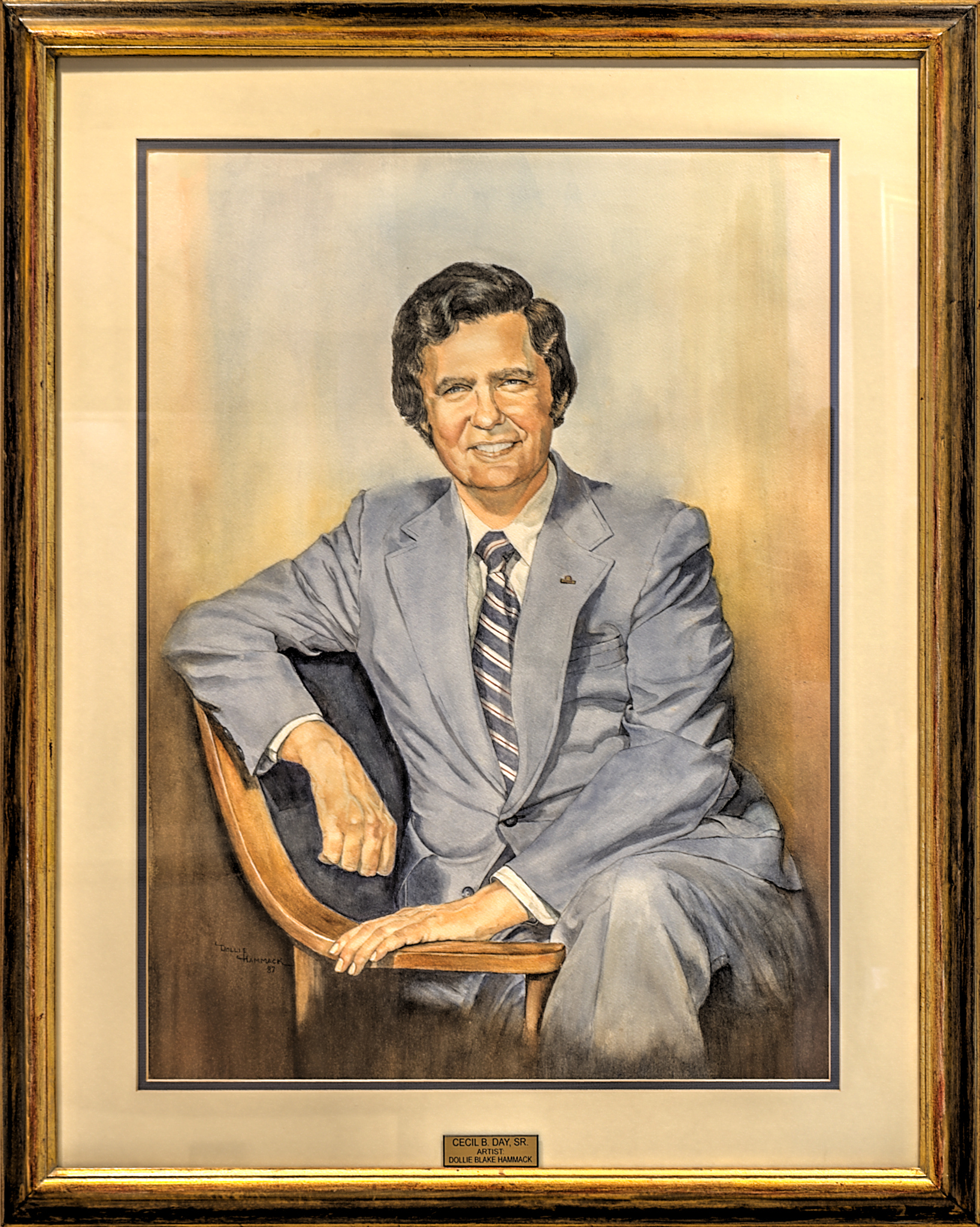
21-02-125-day

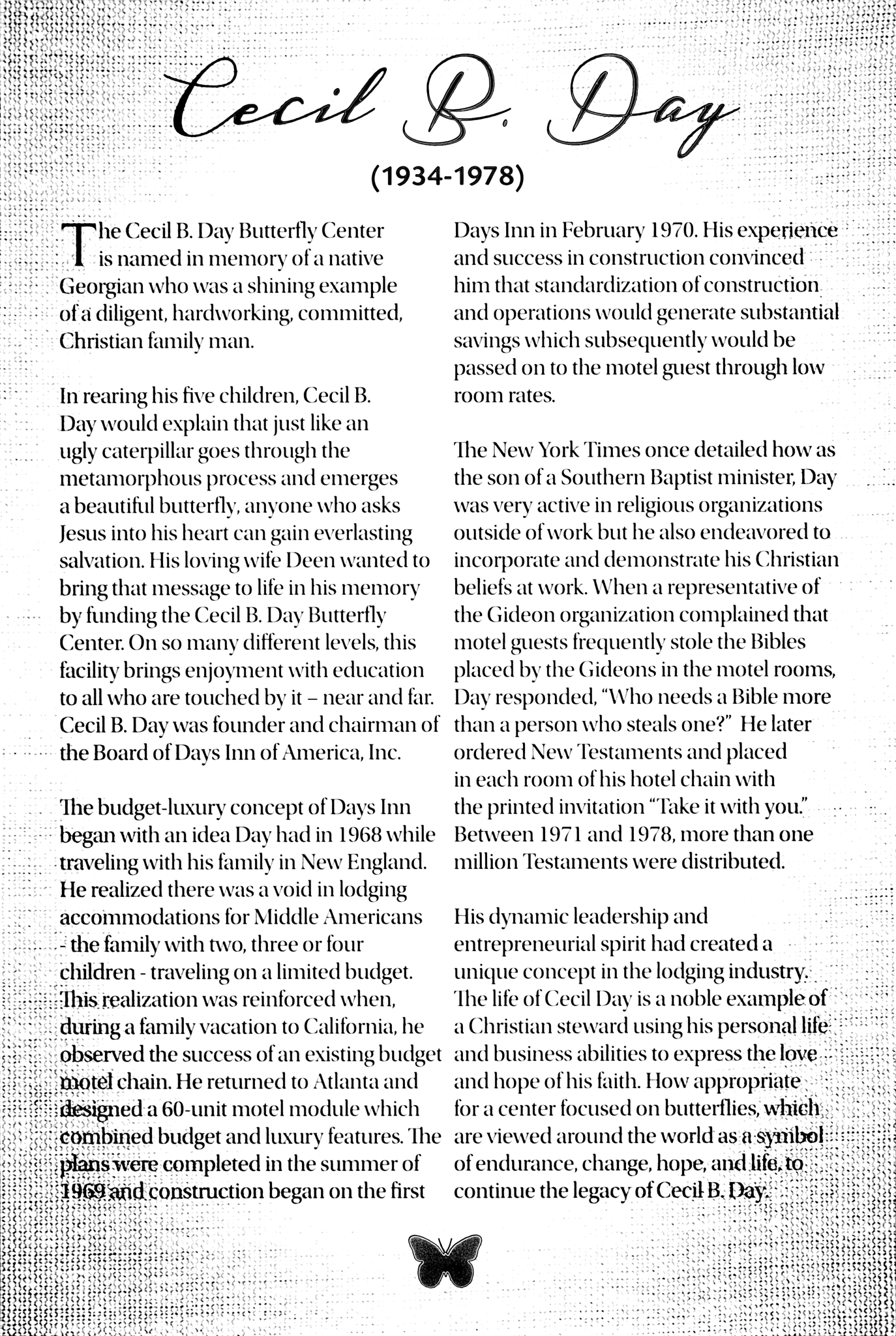
21-02-134-day

The center opened to the public on September 25, 1988 and was one of the first three butterfly centers in the United States.

It was named in honor of Cecil B. Day, a philanthropist and the founder of Days Inn. His wife, Deen Day Sanders, donated artwork and financial assistance to Callaway Gardens in his honor.

The butterfly center is a 7,300-square-foot (680 m^{2}) glass dome that rises to 35 feet at its peak, allowing sunshine inside whenever clouds are absent. The center has received the LEED (Leadership in Energy and Environmental Design) certification award in 2004, which indicates that the building was designed, constructed, and is maintained in ways that are environmentally friendly.

Signs are posted at the exits with a United States Department of Agriculture warning against removing any butterfly, insect or plant material from the premises. Butterflies are considered to be invasive species, requiring a means to prevent "butterfly breakouts". A blast of air is projected inward by a machine at each doorway. Michael Buckman was the manager of the Cecil B. Day Butterfly Center at Callaway Gardens in 2014 and stated, "Butterflies can get sick with viruses and bacterial infections just like humans," said Buckman. "That’s why it’s important to keep the infected butterflies inside so they don’t contaminate our native butterflies and shake up the developed ecosystem."

== Operation ==
There are over a thousand butterflies of over fifty different species at different times of the year. Perhaps just as important are the 250 plants of different varieties that produce the nectar that the butterflies feed on.

The conservatory simulates a tropical ecosystem; the temperature is maintained at approximately 80 °F (27 °C) and 74% relative humidity, ideal conditions for the specimens. People will see more butterflies in the Summer because they get their energy from the sun. It could be said that butterflies are solar powered. Insects are cold-blooded, so they won't take flight until their body temperature reaches 80 °F (27 °C).

The theater continuously plays the film, Wings of Wonder, an award-documentary that examines the life-cycle of a butterfly.

The butterfly center buys butterflies from farmers in six countries: Malaysia, Tanzania, Costa Rica, the Philippines, El Salvador and Ecuador. The butterflies are sent to the gardens via US Mail, FedEx or UPS in small cardboard boxes padded with cotton. They are in the pupa stage (chrysalis) when they are shipped to the center. Upon arrival, the chrysalises are pinned to a vertical board and kept in a controlled environment until they emerge. The conservatory usually has one board on display for observation.

In 2005, the Day Butterfly Center underwent a $2 million renovation to accommodate more visitors. The popular iridescent blue Morpho rhetenor emerges in the month of September and several special butterfly events are held.

== Images ==
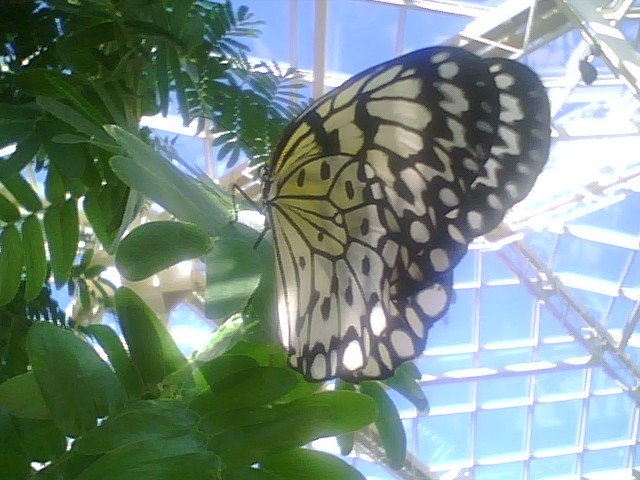
A butterfly at Cecil B. Day Butterfly Center

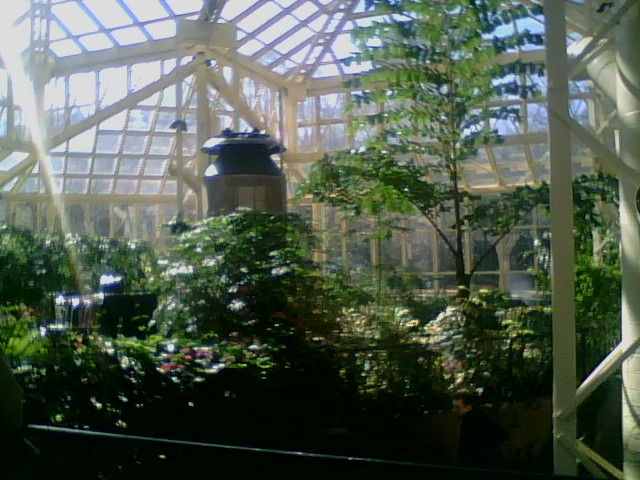
Cecil B. Day Butterfly Center

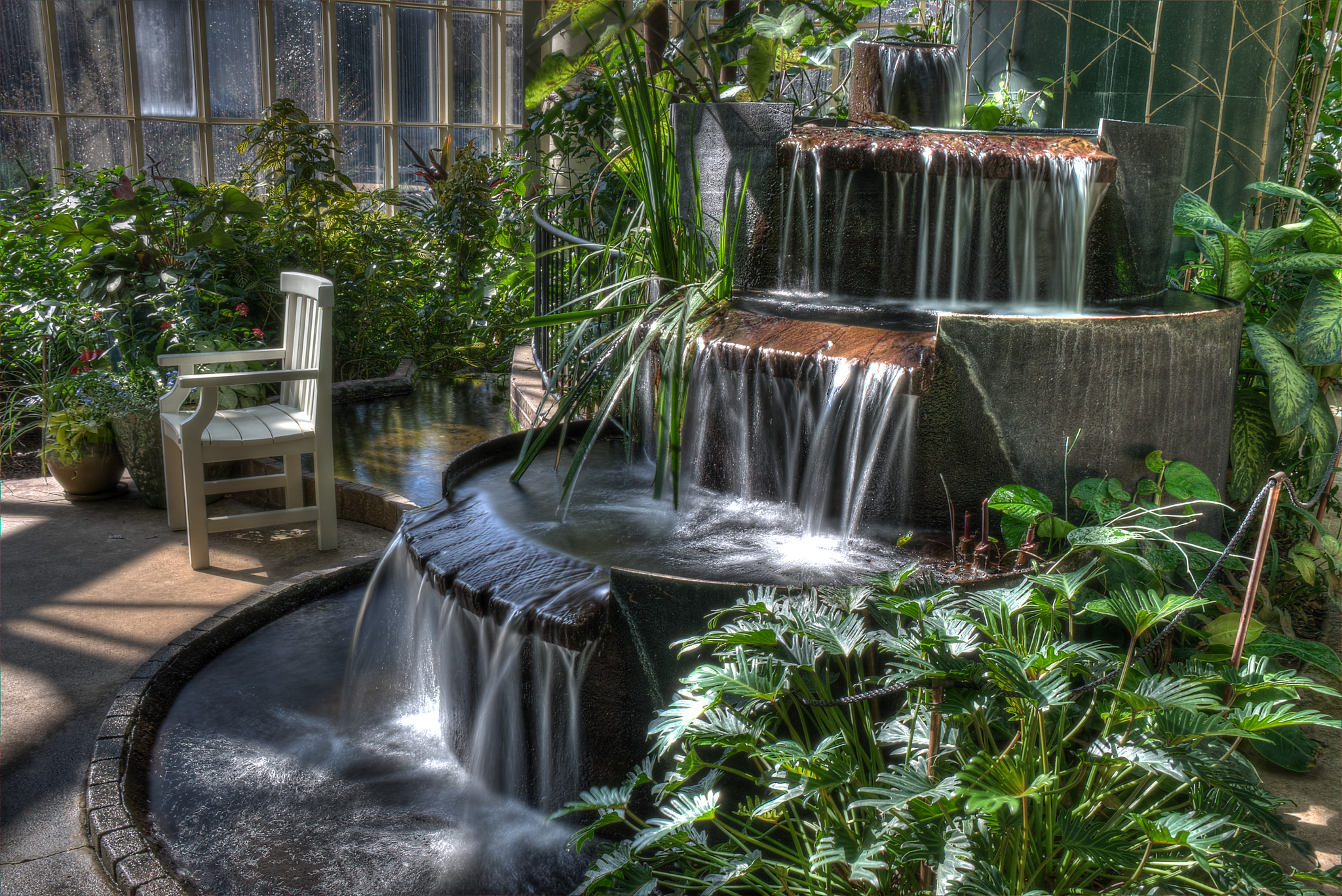
Butterfly Center

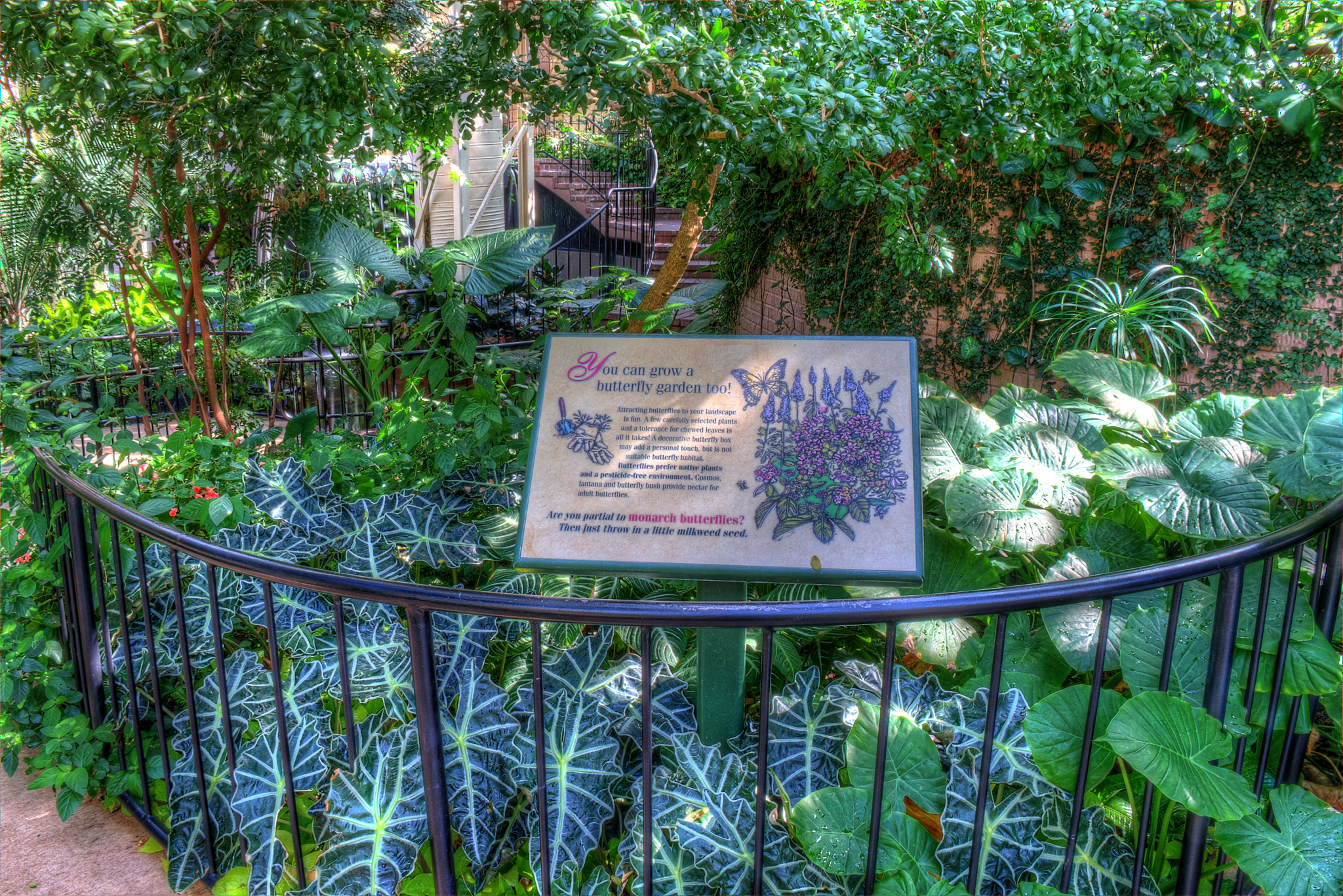
informational sign at Butterfly Center
