= David Tan =

Singaporean legal scholar

Professor David Tan
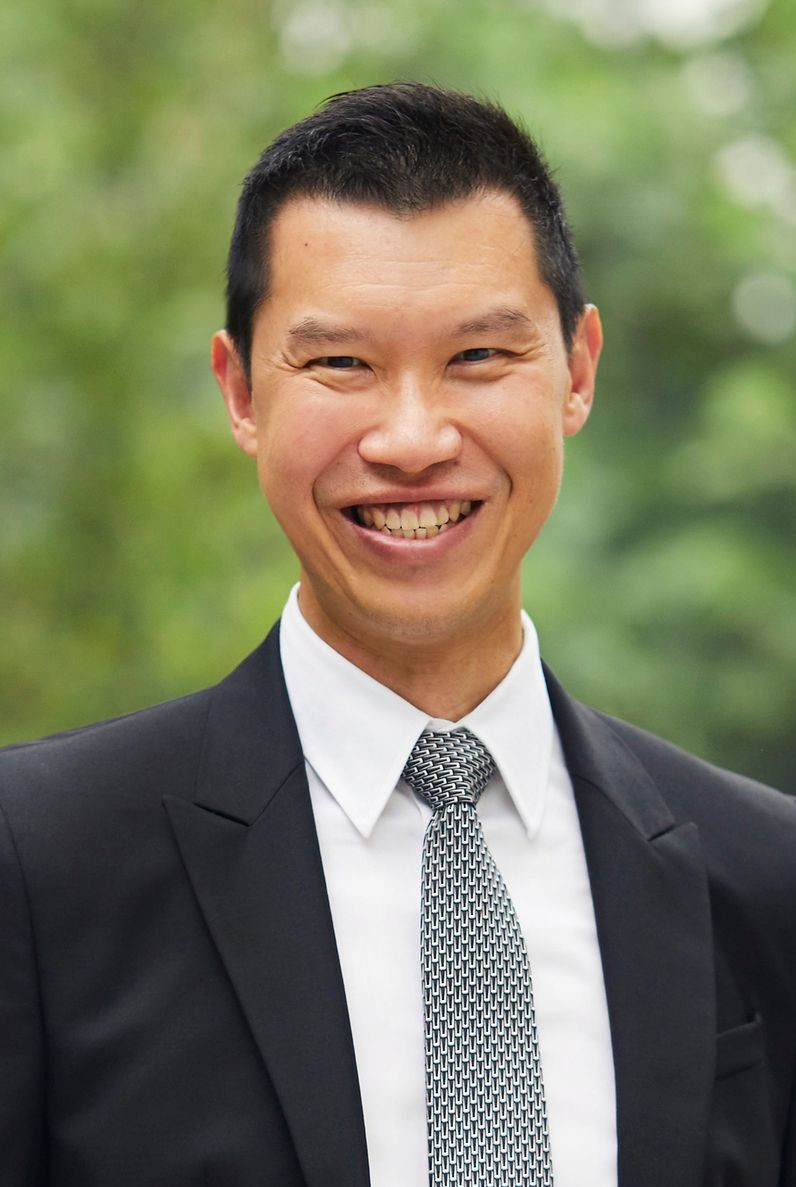
- Born: 1969 (age 56–57)
- Education: B.Com. (Melbourne); LL.B. (Hons) (Melbourne); LL.M. (Harvard); Ph.D. (Melbourne)
- Alma mater: Melbourne Law School; Harvard Law School
- Employer: National University of Singapore
- Notable work: The Commercial Appropriation of Fame: A Cultural Analysis of the Right of Publicity and Passing Off (2017)

David Tan is a Singaporean law professor at the National University of Singapore Faculty of Law. He was the Vice Dean of Academic Affairs from January 2015 to June 2021. His legal scholarship covers intellectual and intangible property law. He is also a fine art and fashion photographer, with exhibitions presented by Cartier and Versace. David served as the Vice President (Business Development & Communications) of the Singapore Badminton Association, a volunteer position, from September 2024 to August 2026. He was appointed to the advisory board of the National Museum of Singapore in 2025.

== Biography ==
Tan graduated with a Bachelor of Laws (First Class Honours) and a Bachelor of Commerce from the University of Melbourne, and he was a resident of Trinity College, Melbourne (1991–1995) where he was named Valedictorian. He was awarded the RJ Hamer and Corrs Chambers Westgarth Prizes in Constitutional & Administrative Law, Price Waterhouse Prize in Contracts, and Rayne Dickson Memorial Exhibition Prize in Health & Medical Law. Tan was conferred a Master of Laws in 1999 from Harvard, where he attended on the Lee Kuan Yew Scholarship.

Tan worked in DBS Bank before joining the Singapore Administrative Service in December 2001, serving as director of International Talent at the Ministry of Manpower and head of Contact Singapore, and as Director of Sports in the Ministry of Community Development, Youth and Sports. David left the Singapore Administrative Service and enrolled in the Ph.D. programme at Melbourne Law School in 2006. He received the Oakleaf Award from Trinity College at the University of Melbourne for "his services to the arts, law and education". The Oakleaf Award commemorates 150 years of Trinity College by recognising living alumni and supporters who have made a notable contribution to Trinity, the broader community, or both, within Australia or globally.

Tan joined NUS Law as an assistant professor in December 2008. In 2012, he became a tenured associate professor. He was appointed vice dean of academic affairs in 2015, overseeing the LL.B. and LL.M. programmes. In 2016, he was appointed to the position of dean's chair at the faculty. He was promoted to full professor on 1 July 2018.

Tan has a curatorial collection of over 200 jackets, mainly blazers, which includes rare runway looks from Alexander Lee McQueen's final menswear collection and Gucci's "Roger Federer Met Gala 2017" crystal cobra tuxedo. In 2022, the National Museum of Singapore acquired some of his jackets as part of the museum’s ongoing documentation of contemporary styles and perspectives in Singapore. In 2023, the National Gallery of Victoria in Melbourne also added a number of his jackets to their permanent collection. From January to March 2024, the Alliance Française de Singapour showcased 42 of his jackets from French brands and France-based designers in a public exhibition "La Veste", that included rare items from Louis Vuitton, Balmain, Dior, and Comme des Garçons.

In March 2026, Tan made a donation of 82 jackets in total to the National Museum of Singapore and Asian Civilisations Museum – the gift was reported to be "the first and biggest donation of contemporary menswear to Singapore’s National Collection." He has also donated to the Metropolitan Museum of Art in New York and the Victoria & Albert Museum in London. Some of the donated jackets had been spotted on two-time Olympic badminton champion Lin Dan, K-pop boy band BTS members V and Jung Kook, and the late American actor Chadwick Boseman.

== Legal scholarship ==
Tan's legal scholarship covers three areas of intellectual and intangible property – personality rights, copyright, and trademarks – as well as tort law and comparative constitutional freedom of expression. He adopts an "interdisciplinary approach drawing on cultural studies and semiotics".

His monograph The Commercial Appropriation of Fame: A Cultural Analysis of the Right of Publicity and Passing Off was published by Cambridge University Press in 2017. David has also published in a range of journals including Yale Journal of International Law, Harvard Journal of Sports & Entertainment Law, Fordham Intellectual Property, Media & Entertainment Law Journal, Virginia Sports & Entertainment Law Journal, WIPO Journal, Sydney Law Review and Law Quarterly Review.

Tan's work also encompasses the future of legal education in Singapore. He has proposed a new "3T" paradigm of "Transnationalism, Technology and Tradition". A landmark paper that he published in the year 2000 in the Yale Journal of International Law titled “Towards a New Regime for the Protection of Outer Space as the Province of All Mankind” has been widely cited, and was the focus of a plenary session discussion panel at the “New Horizons in Air and Space Law: Treaties, Technologies, and Tomorrow’s Challenges” Conference co-organised by the Centre for Technology, Robotics, Artificial Intelligence & the Law at NUS Law and McGill University’s Institute for Air and Space Law in 2024.

== Photography ==
Tan has contributed to magazines like Harper’s Bazaar and Elle. He is currently represented by Yang Gallery. A visual arts studio at Trinity College, Melbourne has been named after him. In 2022, he reimagined Adrian Pang and Kit Chan as Lee Kuan Yew and Kwa Geok Choo based on vintage photographs in the principal photography for The LKY Musical staged by the Singapore Repertory Theatre.

His interest in sport photography has seen him photographing at the Singapore Open Super 750 series since 2022 for the Singapore Badminton Association, and his photographs of players such as Loh Kean Yew have been published in The Straits Times and Zaobao.

Tan has staged several solo photography exhibitions:

- "Multiculturalism or Monoculturalism" (1997)
- "Private Moments" (1999)
- "Visions of Beauty" featuring the designs of Versace (2000)
- "Tainted Perfection" presented by Cartier (2003)
- "The First Decade: 1996-2005" (2005)
- "7 Rules" presented by 7 For All Mankind (2010)
- "Double Exposure" presented by Yang Gallery (2019) (with Billy Mork)
