= Days Inns – Canada =

Canadian hotel chain

- Company type: Private
- Industry: Hotel
- Headquarters: Toronto, Ontario, Canada
- Key people: Irwin M. Prince (President & COO)
- Parent: Realstar Hospitality
- Website: http://www.daysinn.ca

Days Inns – Canada is a hotel chain with over 110 independently owned and operated properties and over 8,810 rooms. Its franchises cover a wide range of urban, airport and resort properties in primary and secondary markets across Canada. An upper-economy brand, Days Inns – Canada master franchise is held and managed by Realstar Hospitality which is headquartered in Toronto, Ontario.

== History ==
In 1992, Realstar Hospitality acquired the master franchise rights for the Days Inn brand in Canada. Realstar Hospitality also holds the master franchise rights for two other hotel brands in Canada and is a division of Realstar Group. The international, privately held Realstar Group was founded over 40 years ago and has offices in Toronto, Ontario, Canada and London, England.

Days Inn brands in Canada include:

- Days Inn / Days Inn & Suites – the most common variety found in cities and towns, along highways and near airports. These properties are limited-service. Select locations have rooms mixed with suites.
- Days Hotel – full-service properties found in large cities and near airports.
- Days Inn & Conference Centre / Days Hotel & Conference Centre – properties offer large meeting spaces as well as food and beverage service.

== Locations ==
Each Days Inn property is independently owned and operated. As of February 2019, hotels are located in:

- British Columbia: 18 hotels
- Alberta: 29 hotels
- Saskatchewan: 8 hotels
- Manitoba: 6 hotels
- Ontario: 31 hotels
- Quebec: 9 hotels
- New Brunswick: 7 hotels
- Nova Scotia: 1 hotel
- Newfoundland: 1 hotel
- Northwest Territories: 1 hotel
- Yukon Territory: 1 hotel

== See also ==
- Days Inn China
