= Charles Stuart (painter) =

English painter

Charles Stuart F.S.A. (1838–1907) was a prolific English still life and landscape painter who exhibited widely throughout the British Isles. He was active from 1854 to 1904.

He was listed as two separate persons in the Royal Academy records, which has caused subsequent confusion. This was added to by the fact that he initially mainly painted still lifes. After 1871 this ceased completely and he painted mainly landscapes thereafter. The abrupt change is seen in a number of exhibition records of his work. These, along with the associated Gravesend work address, show clearly that only one artist was involved.

== Life and family ==
Charles Stuart was born in 1838 to William and Amelia Stuart, both artists. Other Stuart family members were also artists including his brother William who emigrated to Australia in 1859.

In 1860, Stuart exhibited a work entitled Fair and Fruitful Italy (and J. M. Bowkett) at the Royal Society of British Artists. The 'J. M. Bowkett' was the artist Jane Maria Bowkett, and two years later, after obtaining a special licence, the couple married at West Ham on 6 February 1862, with their first child, Leila Imogene, born four months later. The couple had six children but only Leila Imogene, Charles Edward Gordon, born 1865, and William Arthur, born 1869, survived infancy.

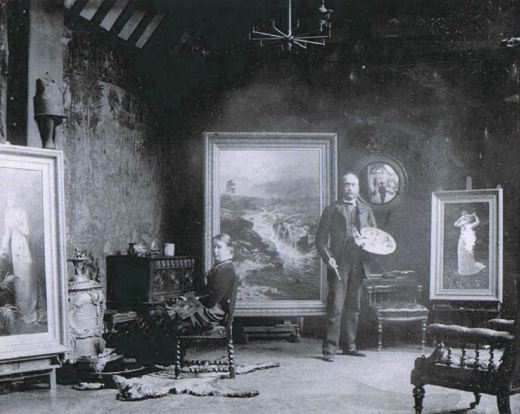
Photograph of Charles Stuart and his wife Jane Maria Bowkett in their studio

The Stuarts spent the early years of their marriage living with Charles' parents in Stepney and Gravesend before making their homes in South Kensington and Fulham Road, in the mid-1870s, and then moving to the fashionable Melbury Road, Holland Park, in 1880. Around this time Stuart was nominated for the London gentlemen's club the Savage, and is depicted, with fellow members in a frontispiece illustration to a 1907 club history. Stuart was also a fellow of the Society of Antiquaries of London. An indication of financial and social success was the purchase of The Hermitage, 1 Cleve Road, West Hampstead in 1885. This was a newly built property with a huge galleried studio connected to the spacious house by a barrel-vaulted glasshouse.

Stuart's wife, Jane, died on 1 June 1891, while Stuart survived her by 16 years. He was buried with her at Kensal Green Cemetery.

== Career ==
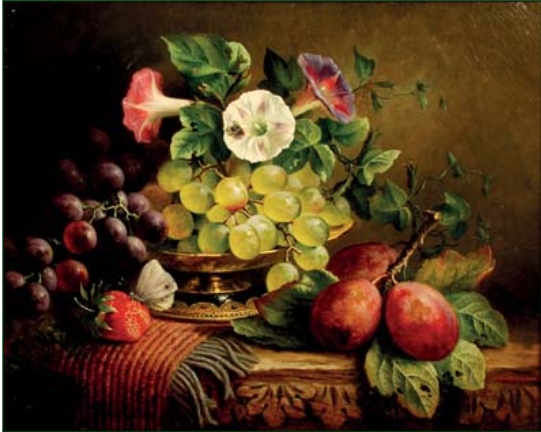
Grapes, Convolvuli and Plums. Oil on canvas, signed Charles Stuart

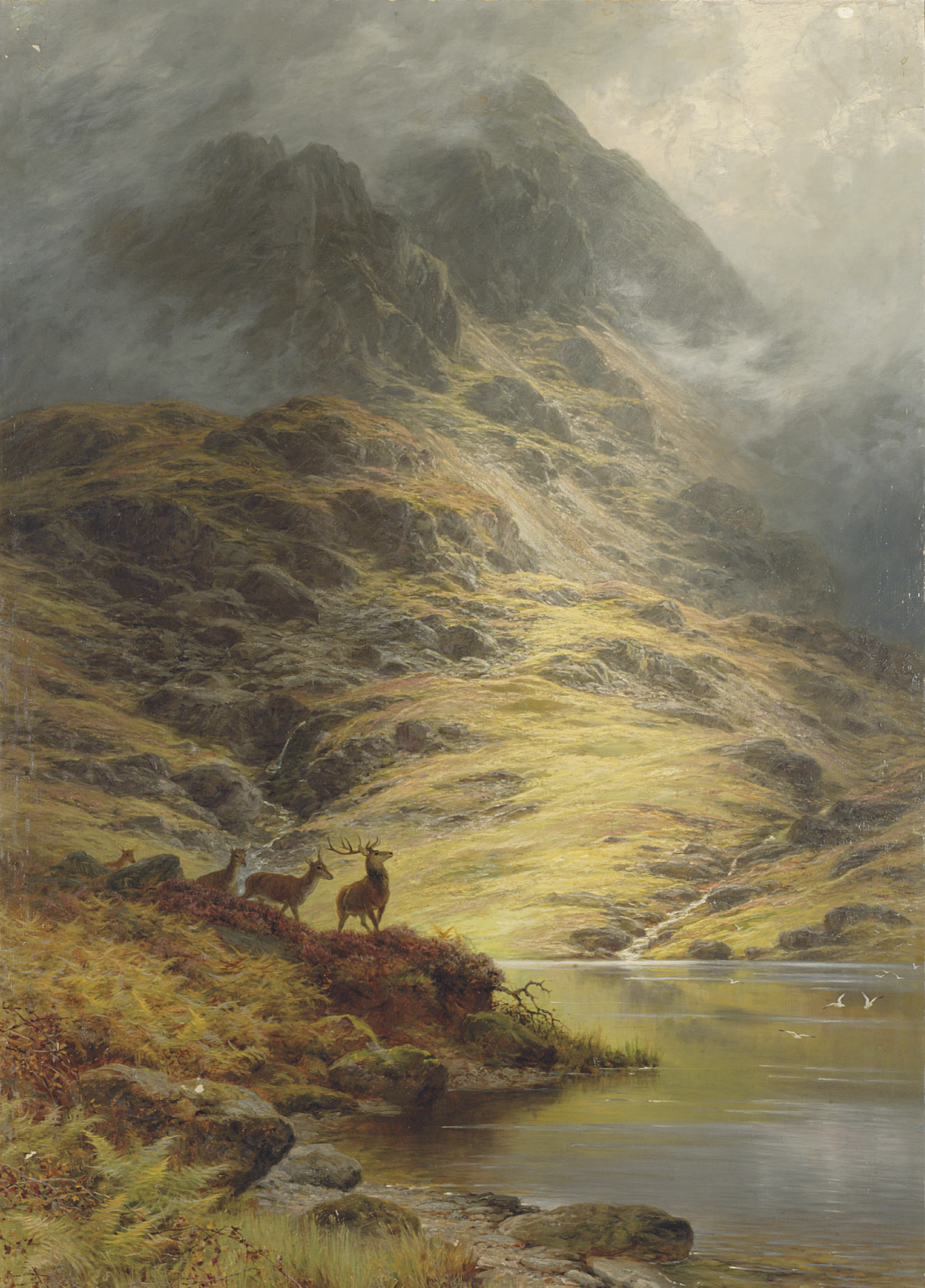
The Incoming Mist, Deer in the Highlands. Signed and dated CHARLES STUART 1895-6. Oil on canvas laid down on board.

Charles Stuart started his long professional career early. At around 16 years of age he exhibited Scene on the Dutch Coast at the British Institution in 1854. Half a century later he exhibited his last painting at the Royal Academy of Arts (Solemn Solitude), in 1904. During the intervening years he also exhibited at many other galleries and societies such as the Royal Society of British Artists, Royal Scottish Academy, Royal Glasgow Institute of the Fine Arts, Royal Hibernian Academy, Walker Art Gallery, Manchester Art Gallery, Royal Birmingham Society of Artists, Grosvenor Gallery, New Gallery (London), Arthur Tooth & Sons, Royal Institute of Oil Painters, and Royal Institute of Painters in Watercolours. There were exhibition sales of his works on the premises of well known art dealers such as Frost and Reed at 8 Clare Street, Bristol
