= Cecil B. Day =

American businessman (1934–1978)

Cecil Burke Day
- Born: December 10, 1934; Brooklet, Georgia, United States
- Died: December 15, 1978 (aged 44); Atlanta, Georgia, United States

Cecil Burke Day (December 10, 1934 – December 15, 1978) was an American hotelier, known for founding the hotel chain Days Inn.

== Biography ==
Day studied at Mercer University in Macon, Georgia, but withdrew prior to graduation to join the United States Marine Corps. After the Marine Corps, Day studied at the Georgia Institute of Technology; he was a member of Sigma Alpha Epsilon fraternity and graduated with a degree in Industrial Management in 1958.

Day owned real estate in Atlanta, Georgia. He sold a duplex for $4,000,000 and used the funds to open the first Days Inn hotel, which was located on Tybee Island, Georgia. Day coined the phrase "budget-luxury" and expanded his hotel chain with great success building a large network of franchise hotels.

Day had five children and was Southern Baptist. He died of cancer in 1978.

== Foundation ==
Cecil B. Day founded the Day Foundation which supported evangelical churches, organizations and Bible Colleges.

== Places named in his honor ==
- The Cecil B. Day Graduate and Professional Campus of Mercer University in Atlanta, Georgia
- The Cecil B. Day Chapel at The Carter Center in Atlanta, Georgia
- Cecil B. Day School of Hospitality Administration at Georgia State University
- Cecil B. Day Butterfly Center at Callaway Gardens in Pine Mountain, Georgia
- Cecil B. Day Fitness Center at Dunwoody Baptist Church in Dunwoody, Georgia
- Day Chapel at Atlanta's Perimeter Church
- Cecil B. Day Auditorium at the North American Mission Board Headquarters in Alpharetta, Georgia

== Images ==
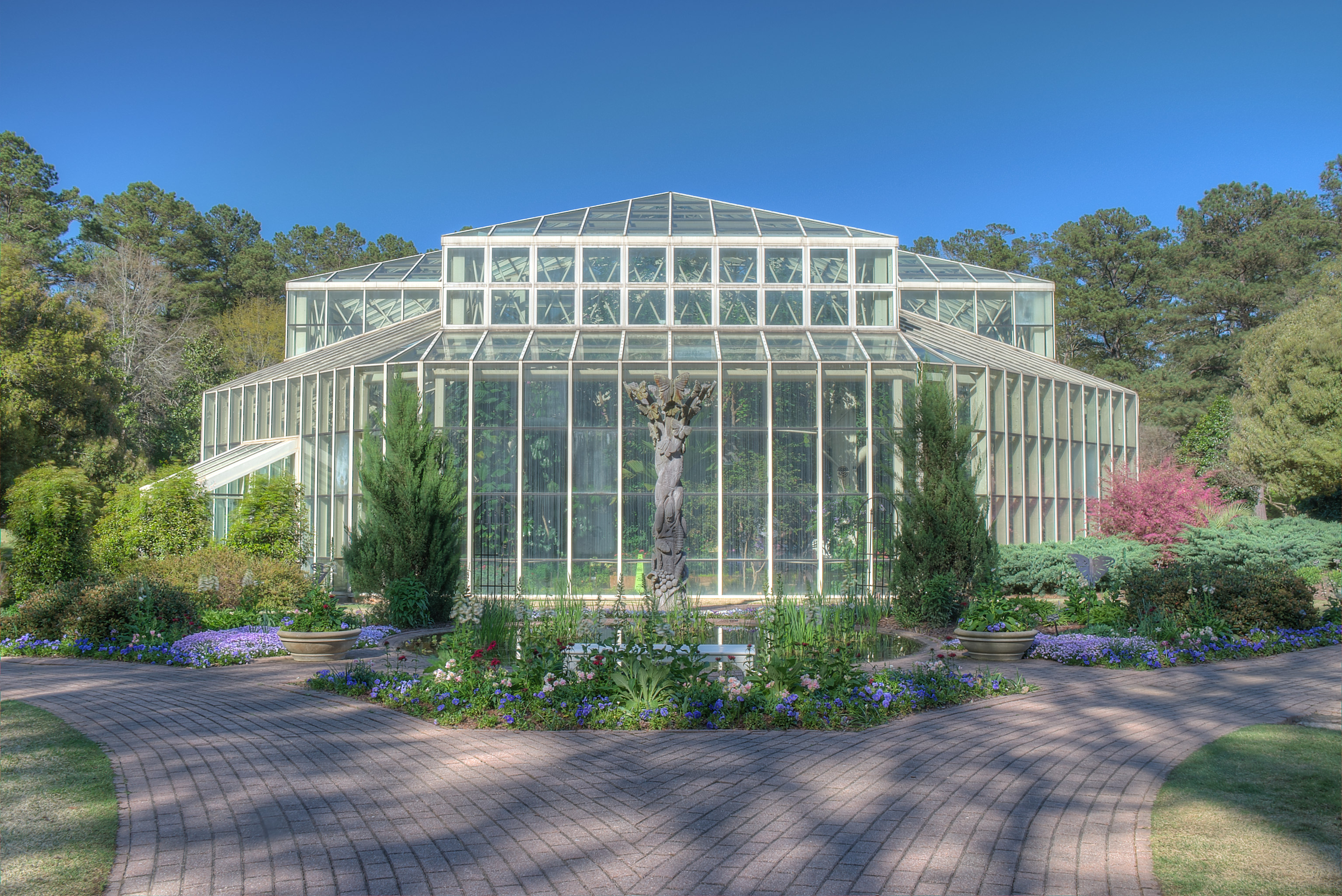
Cecil B. Day Butterfly Center
