= Jane Maria Bowkett =

Jane Maria Bowkett (1837–1891) was a British traditional Victorian genre painter who worked primarily in oils. Her work has been described as 'delightful, slightly naive pictures of women and children, either interiors, or often beach scenes'. She managed, however, to establish a successful career as a professional artist in a male dominated occupation. It has been suggested that in some paintings, she created scenes that were ambiguous by refusing to depict women as models of moral virtue, and depicting mothers and children as being content regardless of a male presence. It is also suggested that the painting Young Lady in a Conservatory makes social commentary on the moral restrictions placed upon women as the subject is seen in a small conservatory with minimal room to move.

== Biography and career ==
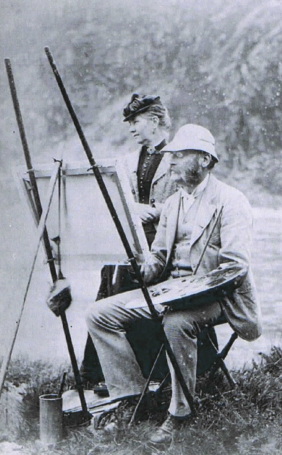
Photograph of Jane Maria Bowkett with her husband Charles Stuart, late 1880s

Born in London, Jane Maria Bowkett was the eldest of thirteen siblings. Many of her sisters became artists as well. Her father, Thomas Bowkett, was a medical practitioner and was active in the Chartist Movement. In 1862 J. M. Bowkett married the artist Charles Stuart, but continued to sign her work using her maiden name. She gave birth to six children, only three of which survived childbirth. The family, however, subsequently prospered, and in the mid-1880s Bowkett and her husband finally purchased an impressive newly built property in Hampstead with a huge galleried studio connected to the spacious house by a barrel-vaulted conservatory. She lived in this home until her death in 1891.

When Bowkett was first training to paint she attended a government-run school of design in London. Bowkett worked primarily in oils in which she often painted everyday domestic and genre scenes. She had a successful career. Her exhibition record started in 1858 with Angels Heads after Joshua Reynolds at the Society of Female Artists (later the Society of Women Artists). In 1860, she made her debut at the British Institution with Put your finger in the foxhole. This was sold for 3 guineas. Her last painting was exhibited at the Royal Hibernian Academy (The Bailiff's Daughter of Islington) in 1891. The price was £35. During the intervening years she exhibited over 120 paintings at these and many other galleries such as Society of British Artists (RBA), Royal Scottish Academy, Royal Glasgow Institute of the Fine Arts, Walker Art Gallery, Manchester Art Gallery, Royal Institute of Oil Painters. High prices could be achieved for her work; for instance, at the RBA in 1875 On the Sands at Shanklin, Isle of Wight sold for £157.10s. She also had four exhibits at the Royal Academy; one in 1861 (Preparing for dinner), two in 1881 (Ophelia and Four miles more) and one in 1882 (Sally in our Alley, etc.).

== Feminist interpretation of Bowkett's work ==
An example of Bowkett's work which has been subject to feminist interpretation is Preparing Tea (or Time for tea as it had been retitled when sold for £2000 at Christie's South Kensington on 16 March 2011). This painting shows a woman, presumably a wife and mother, spreading jam on toast as she gazes out the window while one of her children is toasting bread by a fire and the other child is carrying a pair of men's slippers. It has been suggested that Bowkett leaves some ambiguity in the facial expression of the mother as she sees her husband's train approaching in the distance. And that this piece depicted the ability of women and children alike to be happy without having to rely on a male presence. This critic also suggests that Bowkett's work combined concepts of everyday life, idealized domestic scenes, and ideals of motherhood in which she refused to depict women as being models of domestic virtue. This interpretation is suggested to be demonstrated in some of her other works where Bowkett depicts women bothering themselves with their home duties and not fulfilling expectations that were set for them. The critic concludes that by disrupting the interaction between form and content, Bowkett is able to leave moral ambiguity in her work. Comparing Bowkett's ‘Preparing Tea’ with her similar painting ‘Looking out for Papa’ tends to argue against a consistent ambiguity in her work suggested by the critic. The latter painting's title and content seems to indicate an unambiguous welcome for the imminent arrival of ‘Papa’.

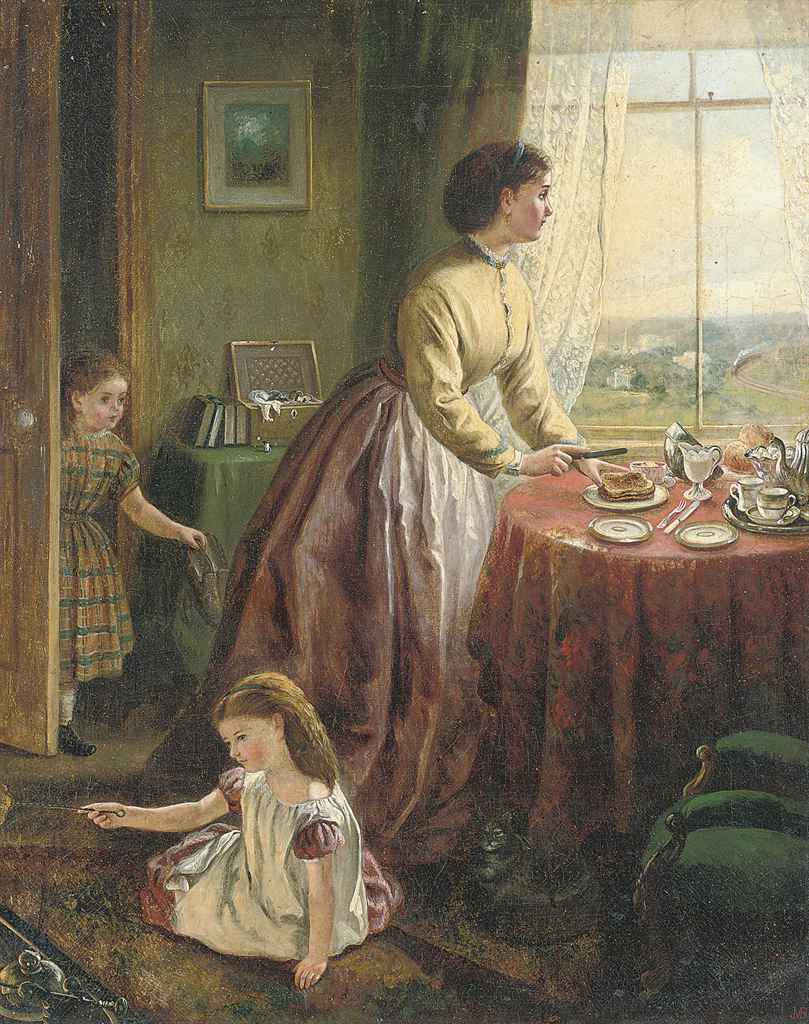
'Preparing Tea'. Jane Maria Bowkett (1837-1891). Signed with a monogram. Oil on canvas.

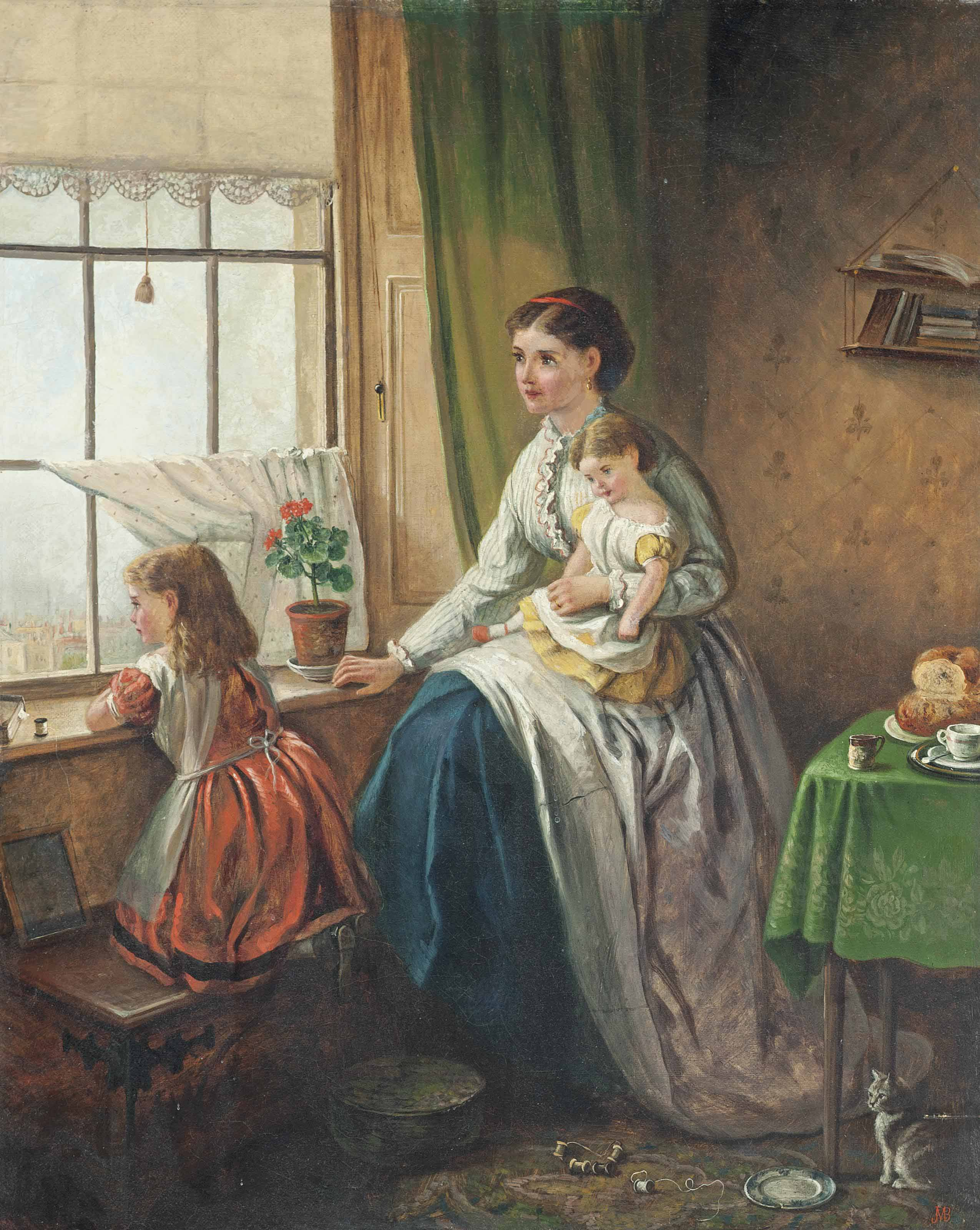
'Looking out for Papa'. Jane Maria Bowkett (1837-1891). Signed with a monogram. Oil on canvas.

It has been suggested that Bowkett saw conservatories as a form of artificial paradise. The painting Young Lady in a Conservatory (1870-1880) depicts a young woman in a conservatory tending to a lily in a large pot. Around her are various other plants such as fuchsias, pelargoniums, and ferns. It has been further suggested that this work depicts a sense of enclosure and makes social commentary about the moral restrictions set out for middle-class women at this time (1870-1880) and that the protruding stamens on the lily add a reference to a sexual awakening which ties back to the concepts of moral restrictions.

== Notable works ==
- Young Lady in a Conservatory (1870-1880)
- Preparing for Dinner (1861)
- Preparing Tea (1860s)
- Folkestone Beach (1875)
- Girl at Well (c.1886)
- A Beach Scene (undated)
- Awfully Jolly
- Out of Reach
- Valuable Assistance

=== Gallery ===
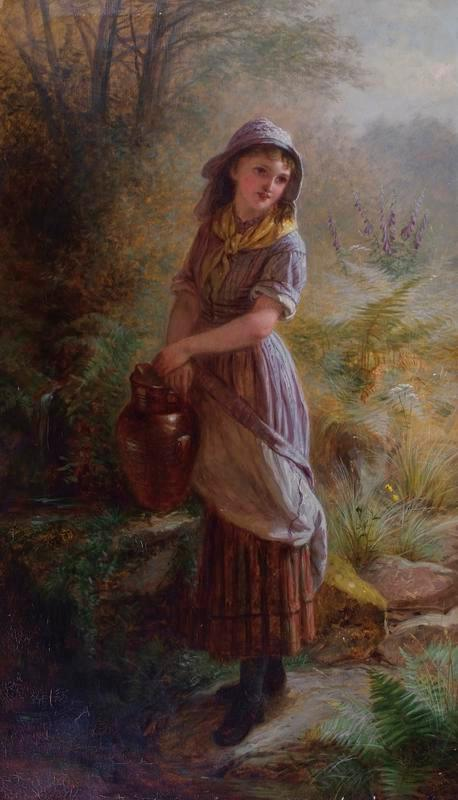
Girl at Well (c.1886), Aberdeen Art Gallery

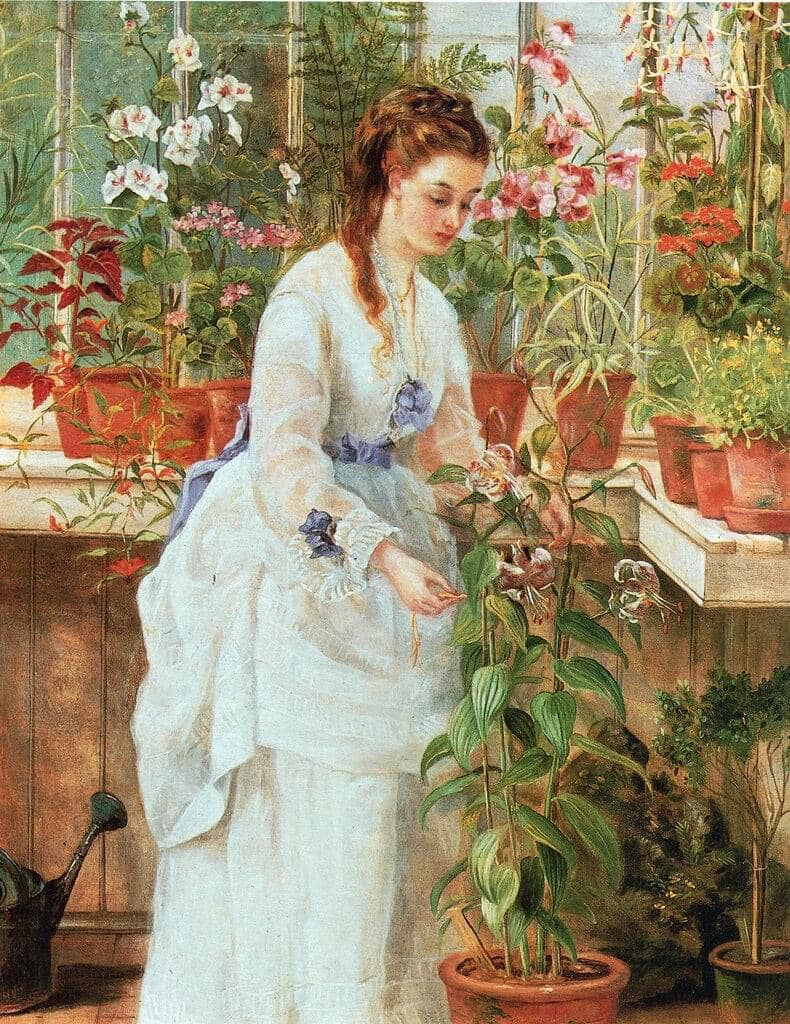
Young Lady in a Conservatory (1870-1880)
