= The WIPO Journal =

The WIPO Journal: Analysis and Debate of Intellectual Property Issues was a peer-reviewed law review established in 2009 that was published by Sweet & Maxwell (a division of Thomson Reuters) on behalf of the World Intellectual Property Organization. Its editor-in-chief was Peter K. Yu. The WIPO Journal was discontinued at the end of 2016.
