= Days Inn =

Economy hotel chain run by Wyndham Hotels & Resorts

Days Inn Worldwide Inc.
- Trade name: Days Inn by Wyndham
- Type: Subsidiary
- Industry: Hotel Franchising
- Founded: August 1970; 56 years ago, Tybee Island, Georgia
- Founder: Cecil B. Day
- Headquarters: Parsippany, New Jersey, U.S.
- Number of locations: 1,501 (December 31, 2023)
- Key people: John Henderson (President)
- Parent: Wyndham Hotels & Resorts
- Website: wyndhamhotels.com/days-inn

Days Inn is a hotel chain headquartered in the United States. It was founded in 1970 by Cecil B. Day, who opened the first location in Tybee Island, Georgia. The brand is now a part of the Wyndham Hotels and Resorts, headquartered in Parsippany, New Jersey, which used to be a part of Cendant. As of December 31, 2023, Days Inn includes 1,501 locations worldwide with 114,216 rooms.

== History ==
Founder Cecil B. Day, before creating Days Inn, had worked in real estate in Atlanta, Georgia, where he built and developed apartment complexes. He also owned several locations of the fast food chains Jiffy Drive-In and Carrols in Atlanta. Day sold his holdings to Phipps Land Company for $14 million in 1969, the largest real estate transaction in the state of Georgia at the time.

Day founded Days Inn on Tybee Island, Georgia, in 1970. He proposed the idea as a means of using a piece of land he owned on the island. When the first Days Inn opened, Day could not find maid service, so he had his children make up the rooms' beds. Also, a truck that delivered furniture was too heavy for the bridge onto the island, so Day's mother hauled furniture onto the island in her station wagon. Despite the criticism that Day faced from friends for wanting to start a new lodging option on a "no-name island" with a flagging tourist economy, the first Days Inn was 100 percent occupied by April 1970. The first property featured 60 rooms and a price of $8 per room. Throughout most of the 1970s, the Inns were referred to as 8 Days Inn with pricing starting at $8.88 per room. As costs increased, the 8 was removed from advertising and signage.

Later in 1970, Day opened the second location, in Forsyth, Georgia. During a heavy rainstorm a week before construction was completed and the planned opening day, about 20 travelers were allowed to stay at the property, at Day's insistence despite unfinished rooms. Three nights later all 120 rooms were occupied. Through the 1970s hotel guests could take home a paperback Bible (usually the American Bible Society Good News Bible New Testament) from their guest rooms for free. Days Inn of America, Inc. began franchising hotels in 1972 and within eight years created a system of more than 300 hotels in the United States, Mexico, and Canada.

Stanley S. Tollman and Monty D. Hundley, via the Tollman-Hundley Hotel Group, became the largest franchisees in the 1980s and bought Days Inn of America. In 1991, they took it into bankruptcy and then sold it to Hospitality Franchise Systems. Tollman and Hundley were indicted on federal bank fraud and tax fraud charges because they had not disclosed all assets in the process. Tollman fled to London in 2002, where he fought extradition for many years. In 2008, he agreed to a plea deal that would allow him to return home in exchange for more than $100 million.

In August of 2022, a mass shooting took place in and outside of a Days Inn in Phoenix, Arizona. Two were killed and 5 others were injured before the shooter committed suicide.

== Concepts ==
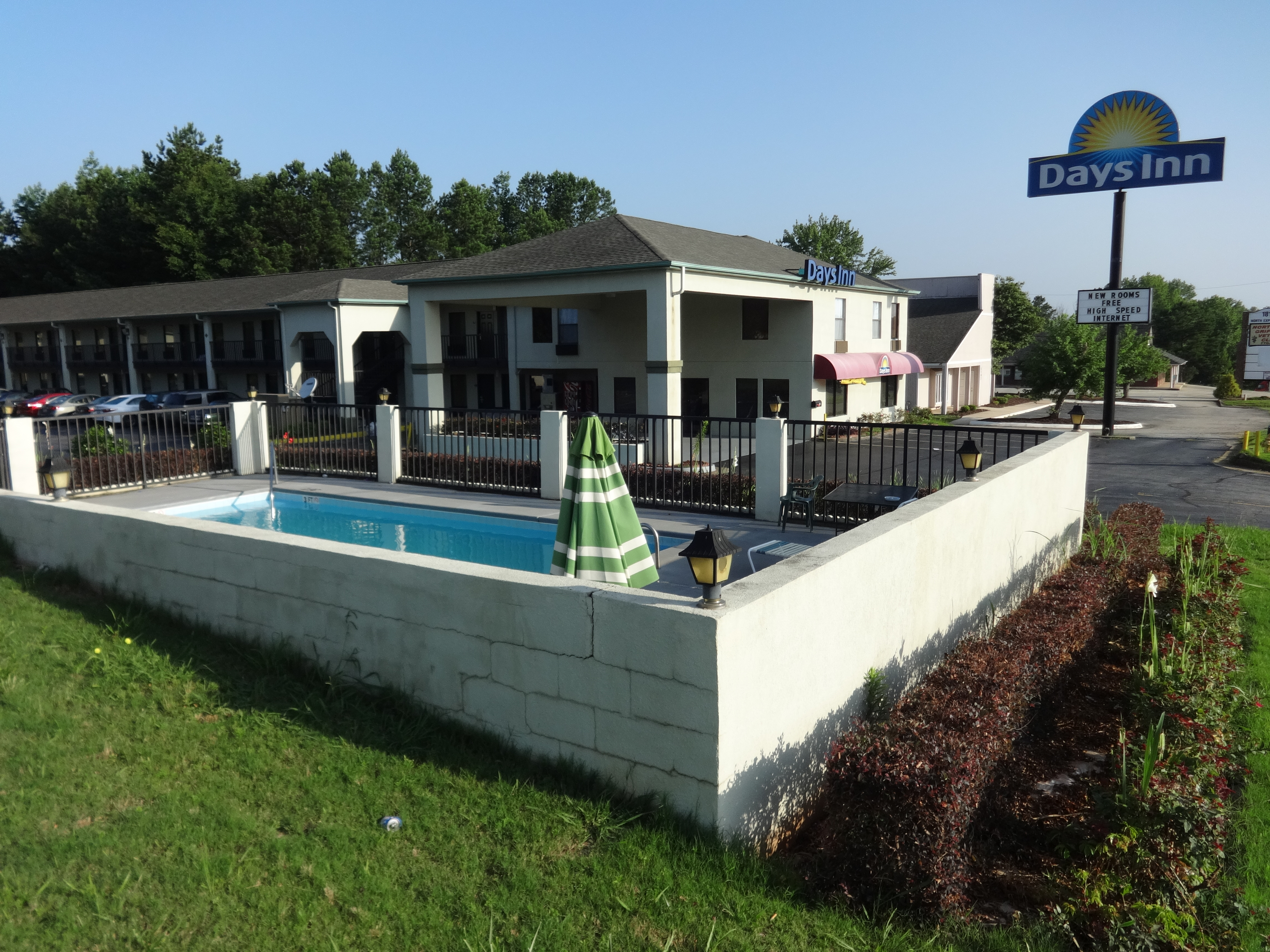
Days Inn in Griffin, Georgia

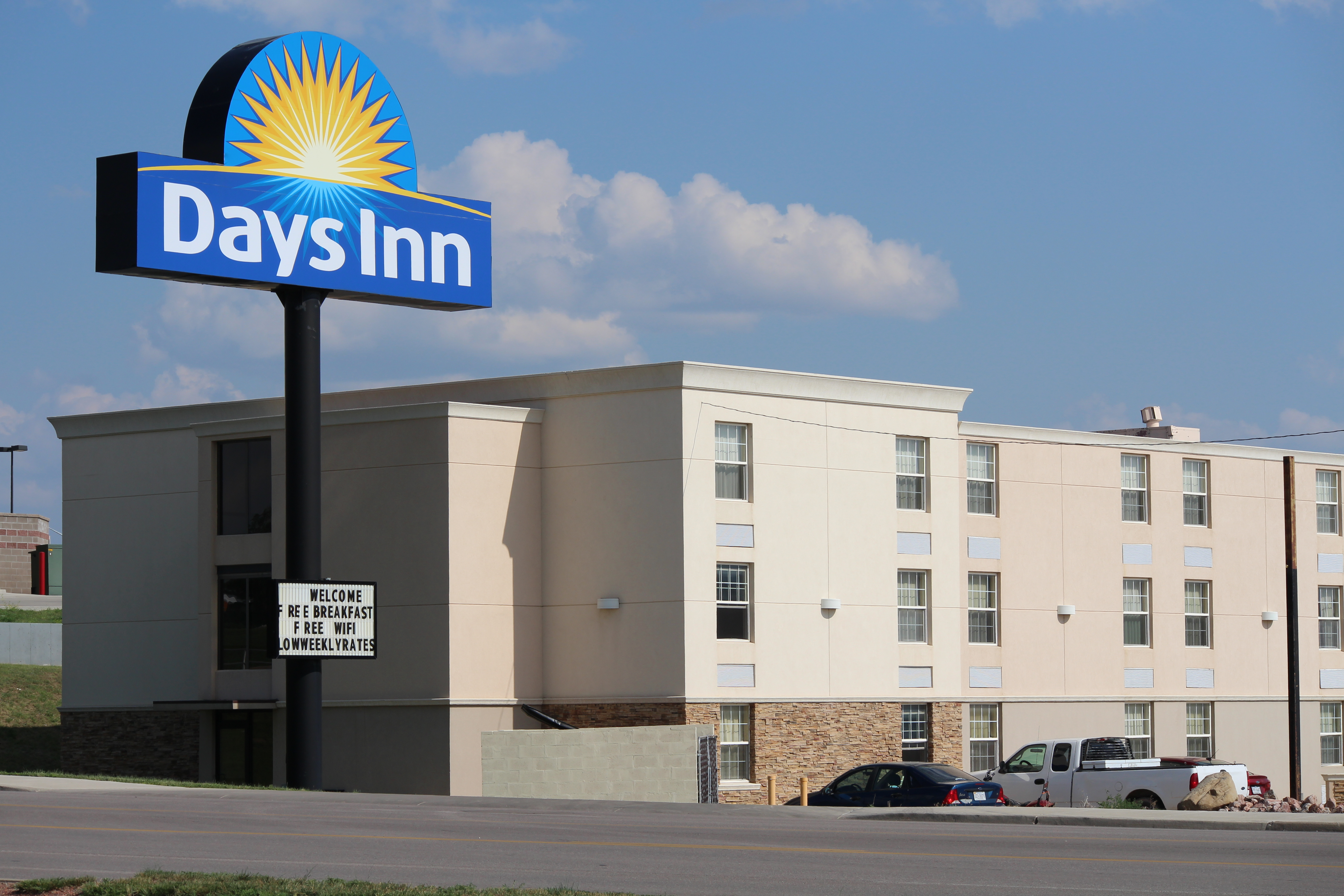
Days Inn in Gillette, Wyoming

Starting with the second location in Forsyth, many Days Inns featured a restaurant and gift shop combination called Tasty World. Day refused to sell alcohol at Tasty World restaurants. Day did not drink alcohol and decided to target families with the brand. He noted that his refusal was criticized by bankers, who felt that including a bar would increase profits. Forsyth and many properties after it also featured on-site gasoline pumps to sell unbranded fuel to motel guests. Day, who was a devout Christian, also offered a network of chaplains to provide ministry at each motel.

Days Inn was one of the first hotel chains to offer discounts to senior citizens. It was also among the first to locate its properties along suburban and rural exits on the Interstate Highway System, as opposed to more urban locations.

== Brands ==
The hotel brands of Days Inn include:

- Days Inn and Days Inn & Suites – Full- or limited-service. Some properties are only rooms; others have rooms mixed with suites.
- Days Hotel – full-service variant found in high-traffic and large cities.
- Days Suites – all-suites variant; may be either full- or limited-service.
- Days Lodge – a short lived chain of lodges.
- Days Park – for recreational vehicles and motor homes.
- Daystop – a short-lived budget chain started in 1990 in Lakeville, Minnesota.

== Days Inn in the United Kingdom ==
In the UK, the top four motorway service operators have Days Inn hotels. Welcome Break brought the Days Inn brand to the UK under a licence from a US company. It used to have one at each service station with a hotel. However, some have been converted to Ramada. Welcome Break also run a couple of non-motorway hotels, one of which is in Milton Keynes. Additionally, some locations are operated on behalf of Extra Services. Roadchef also maintains Days Inn Hotels at most of their sites. Days Inn and Moto Hospitality have experimented with two hotels in Wetherby and Winchester.

== See also ==
- Days Inns – Canada
- Days Inn China
