= Tessellated roof =

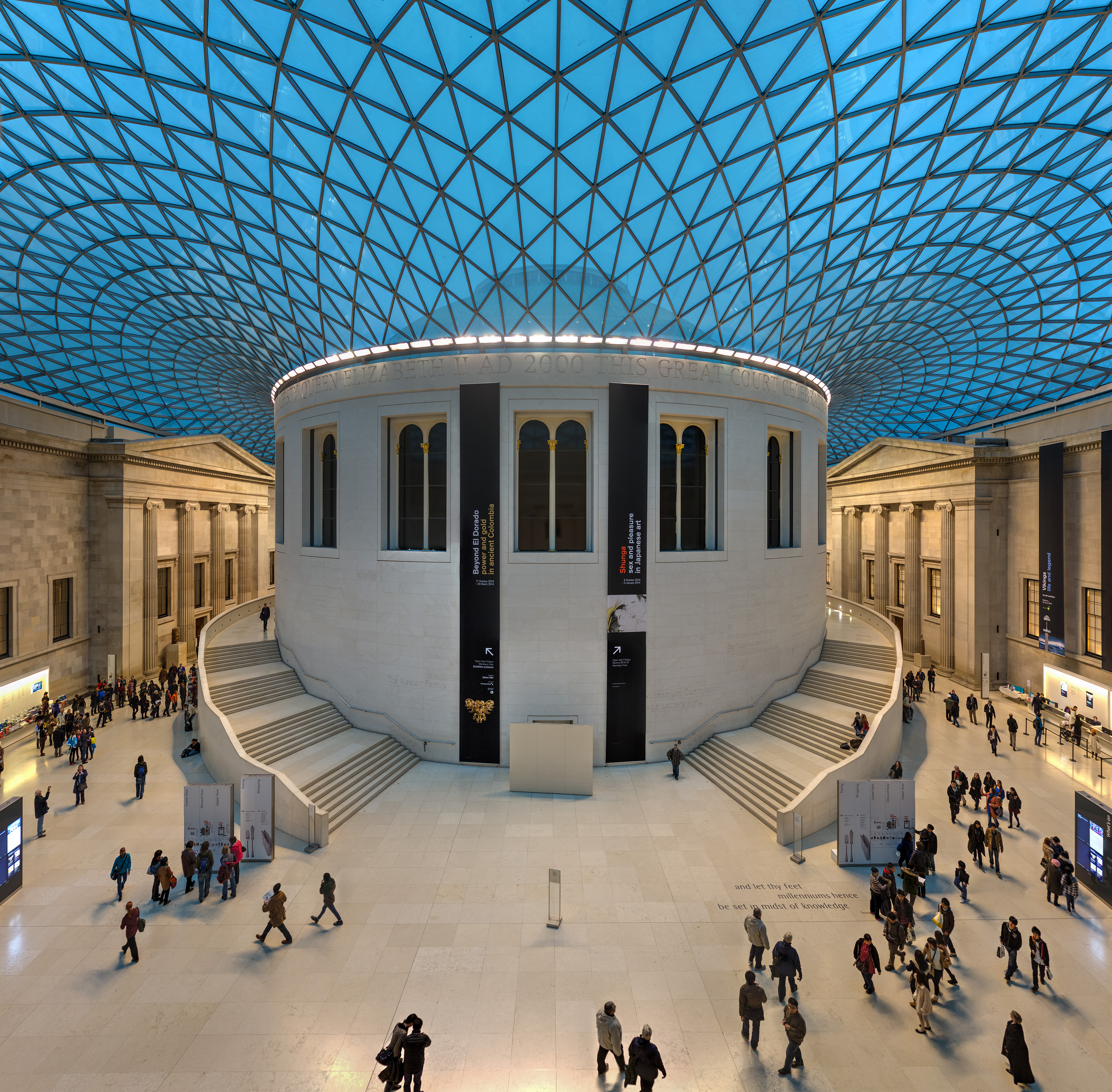
British Museum, London

A tessellated roof is a frame and a self-supporting structural system in architecture. A simple ridged roof may inside be a tessellated system. The interlinking shapes are replicated across the moulded surface using curvilinear coordinates, a specific technique with rigid interlinking beams, having characteristics similar to woven fabric. A tessellated roof is one of the most flexible framed systems to design. The measurements and precision are complex and commonly part of a computer-aided design process of production. It is used in a honeycomb geometry form, in the biomes of the Eden Project.

It can be fabricated to fit a wide range of situations. The size of the repeated geometric shape used can be customised, with a multitude of the same shape throughout the structure. An even and equal load is shared by the interlocking structural integrity of the frame as a whole. The use of a tessellated roof for public areas is an increasingly implemented architectural feature of modern public buildings, covering walkways and over retail centers. A transparent roof being for shelter from the weather, has an advantage during daylight with electricity for artificial lighting in solid roof buildings being a financial cost.

A modern tessellated roof for roofing public areas is a variation of a greenhouse or glass roof in different shapes and sized. The roof can be held aloft with columns, that may have branches to support and connect to the roof latticework, which stabilise the roof to create a strong structure. The material of the roof in-between or covering the tessellated frame may be a light composite, toughened glass or insulated glazing. There are roofed boulevards with columns that can form a colonnade. Some tessellated roof shapes connect to the ground in place of conventional rain gutters, for example the FieraMilano, or it can be supported entirely by the surrounding buildings. A tessellated roof can convert previous outdoor space into a dry public area; some examples of this method are Galleria Vittorio Emanuele II and many other shopping complexes, the Queen Elizabeth II Great Court at the British Museum in London by Norman Foster, and the Sydney Opera House.

== See also ==
- Reciprocal frame
- Space frame
- Thin-shell structure
