= American Car Rental Association =

American car rental company

The American Car Rental Association (ACRA) is a formal trade organization based in Washington D.C., composed of rental car companies, that advocates and lobbies on behalf of the car rental industry with elected officials and consumer advocates at the federal, state and local levels of government.

== History ==
In 1978, a number of major car rental companies and larger independent car rental owners formed a national association that would share a unified voice when representing the car rental industry at legislative hearings. The association's goal was to represent as many voters as possible so they welcomed the smaller auto rental franchise systems and companies to join ACRA.

ACRA was chartered in San Francisco, California in April 1978. The first president was Eldon Barnard. Original members including Avis, National, Budget, Alamo, Thrifty Car Rental, Dollar, and numerous other rental car companies.

Throughout the 1980s and 1990s, there were many Senior Level company Executives, including some CEO's of major rental car systems serving as president of the association. This list of distinguished industry executives included Joe James with National Car Rental, Don Himelfarb with Thrifty Car Rental, Gary Paxton with Dollar Rent A Car, Phil Schailer with Alamo Rent A Car, Sandford Miller with Budget Rent A Car, Bill McPike, Dan Huntoon and David Schaefer with Avis, and Wayne Kauffman with Enterprise Car Rental.

ACRA is the industry voice on public policy issues facing the car rental industry. It is governed by a board of directors that represents a large cross-section of the car rental industry and acts in strict compliance with the antitrust laws. The association provides strategic media communications and consistent public “voice”.

== Areas of activity ==
The American Car Rental Association operates on behalf of the U.S. car rental business by: (a) lobbying on the state and federal level, (b) analyzing and reporting on federal, state and local laws, (c) educating its membership about recent developments in public policy and court decisions, (d) providing appropriate services as needed to support these goals and organizing and (e) participating in the annual International Car Rental Show and the annual D.C. Conference.

== Accomplishments ==
ACRA is actively lobbying to eliminate excise taxes on car rental transactions in state and local governments. In Arizona, Florida, and the State of Washington taxes were eliminated or stopped. ACRA is actively engaged in pursuing federal legislation that would prohibit future excise taxes imposed solely on the car rental industry as discriminatory.

ACRA fought hard to reduce MFR (Minimum Financial Responsibility) levels for rental car companies in Maine and thwarted efforts to increase these levels in New York.

ACRA helped pass legislation in Arizona that shifted the company's liability to a secondary position rather than primary thereby making the tortfeasor the first in line to pay personal injury claims when other insurance is available.

ACRA was instrumental in the elimination of vicarious liability on a federal level, the Graves Amendment, and has been in the forefront of defeating numerous attempts at a repeal of this legislation. ACRA members have also prevailed in legal challenges to this law.

== Members ==
The American Car Rental Association is composed of rental car company members (“regular” members) and associate or vendor members. The major car rental companies include:

- ACE Rent a Car
- Advantage Rent a Car
- Avis Budget Group
- Enterprise Holdings
- Green Motion Car and Van Rental
- The Hertz Corporation
- Nu Car Rentals
- Payless Car Rental
- Rent-a-Wreck
- Uhaul Car Share
- U-Save Auto Rental of America

== Board of Directors ==
- Sharky Laguana - Chairman
- Josh Dover
- William Harris
- Gordon Reel
- Michael L. DeLorenzo
- Steve Shur
- Bill Wallschlaeger
- Jennifer Gelder
- Bert Sheppard
- Carlos A. Bazan
