= Luis de Jesús Rodríguez =

Dominican attorney, businessman, and entrepreneur

- Born: July 8, 1963 (age 63); Constanza, Dominican Republic
- Education: CEU San Pablo University; University of Barcelona
- Occupation: Director of investment fund casa de santo domingo
- Years active: 1985–present
- Known for: President and CEO of Domino's Pizza and Avis Budget Group in the Dominican Republic and Haiti

Luis de Jesus Rodríguez Gutiérrez (born July 8, 1963) is a Dominican attorney, businessman, and entrepreneur. Rodriguez has served as director of the Domino's Pizza franchise in the Dominican Republic and Haiti since 1993, as well as director of car rental company Avis Budget Group since 1997. He currently serves on the board of directors of Universal AFI and as managing director of Investment Fund Casa de Santo Domingo.

== Early years and education ==
Luis de Jesus Gutierrez Rodriguez was born on July 8, 1963, in Constanza, a town located in the La Vega Province within the central region of the Dominican Republic. He is the son of a Spanish immigrant and a Dominican woman. At a young age, Luis' father decided to leave his job as a farmer to work as a sales representative, and moved the family to the capital city of Santo Domingo. After that, they moved to the city of Higüey, in the east of the island.

Luis and his brother studied at the John XXIII School, which was owned by the Catholic Church. Due to economic difficulties as a result of his father's failed businesses, Rodríguez began working from the age of twelve years as a money changer at the entrance of the local post office. In 1978, Luis and his family were evicted from their home by creditors of the property, forcing them to return to Santo Domingo. At the age of 16, Rodríguez decided to apply for the position of washer at the used car department of National Car Rental. Although initially he did not get the job, the interviewer thought Rodríguez was better suited to work in the rental department, and hired him as an assistant. Rodríguez continued studying at public night school while he worked during the day as a rental agent trainee.

After finishing high school, Rodríguez started his law degree, graduating with honors at the age 21. At this time, he was promoted as general manager of National Car Rental. Currently, Rodríguez has an MBA from CEU San Pablo University, and a master's degree in management from the University of Barcelona.

== Business career ==
At the age of 22, Rodríguez decided to start a car rental business with the help of a Spanish investment group. In 1986, he founded Express Rent-a-Car with an initial fleet of 8 cars. Two years later, the business had a fleet of 150 cars and became part of the Thrifty Car Rental Dominican franchise. In 1990, Rodríguez also acquired the Thrifty franchise in Puerto Rico. In 1992, he sold his stake in the company to his Spanish partners to start other businesses.

In 1992, Rodríguez bought the Domino's Pizza franchise for the Dominican Republic, opening the first store in the country a year later. At that time, Domino's was only the second American franchise in the Dominican Republic. During that first year, they were able to open three new stores. A year later, Domino's was the first American franchise to open in the country of Haiti. During his time in charge of the franchise, Rodríguez has received the Gold Franny Award, awarded by Domino's headquarters to the best franchise operators. His son, Luis Francisco Rodriguez, is general manager of the franchise.

In 1997, Rodríguez acquired 50% of the shares of Servicolt, the operating company of the Avis Rent-a-Car franchise. In 2004, he also acquired Budget Car Rental, becoming the largest car rental company in the Dominican Republic. In 2015, Rodriguez also acquired Payless Car Rental to consolidate business operations. Under the direction of Rodríguez, Avis has made alliances with Delta Air Lines, Mini Cooper, and Audi. Currently, Avis has a fleet of 1,000 vehicles and 16 locations in the Dominican Republic.

In 2004, Rodríguez was recognized by the organization JCI Jaycees '72, along with other young people, as one of the Outstanding Young Persons of the Dominican Republic.

== Career as an investor ==
In 2014, Rodríguez turned his business into a private investment fund under the name Casa de Santo Domingo. The fund is focused on three portfolios: transportation, real estate, and investments. Rodríguez assumed the role of director and Asset Manager alongside a group of investors. In addition to Casa de Santo Domingo, he also started Patio Group, an investment group focused in shopping malls, and KM100 Fleet, a vehicular fleet management company in the Dominican Republic.

Rodriguez is also member of the board of directors of AFI Universal, a management company of investment funds.
