= Ryder =

American transportation company

Ryder System, Inc.
- Type: Public
- Traded as: NYSE: R; DJTA component; S&P 400 component
- Industry: Transportation
- Founded: 1933; 93 years ago in Miami, Florida, U.S.
- Founder: James Ryder
- Headquarters: Coral Gables, Florida, U.S.
- Key people: John Diez (president & CEO); Cristina Gallo-Aquino (EVP)
- Services: Fleet management Supply chain management Dedicated carrier Cargo truck rental
- Revenue: ▲US$8.925 billion (2019)
- Operating income: ▼US$341.15 million (2019)
- Net income: ▼US$24.41 million (2019)
- Total assets: ▼US$1.562 billion (2019)
- Total equity: ▼US$2.476 billion (2019)
- Number of employees: 39,900 (2019)
- Website: ryder.com

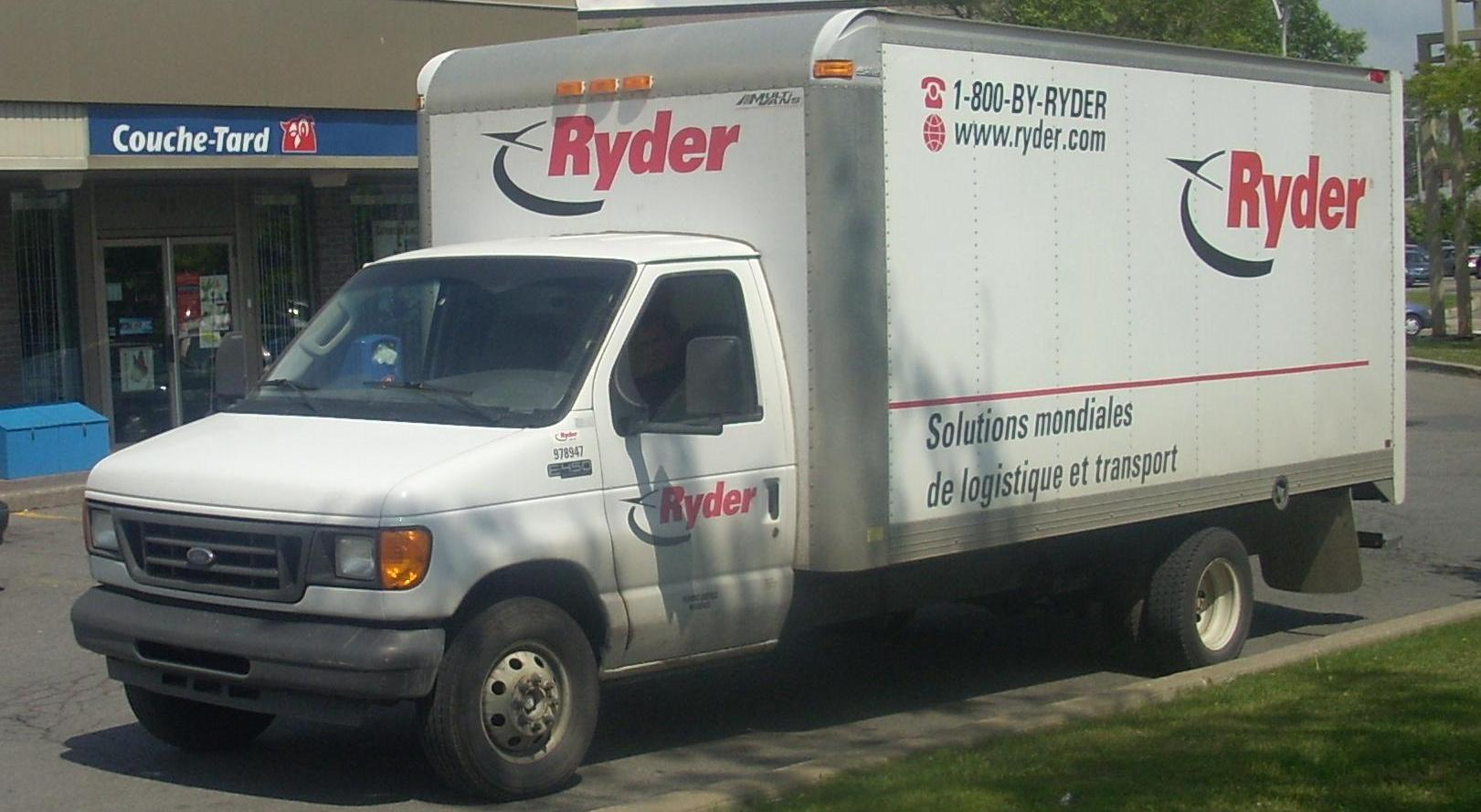
A 2003–2007 Ryder Ford E-450

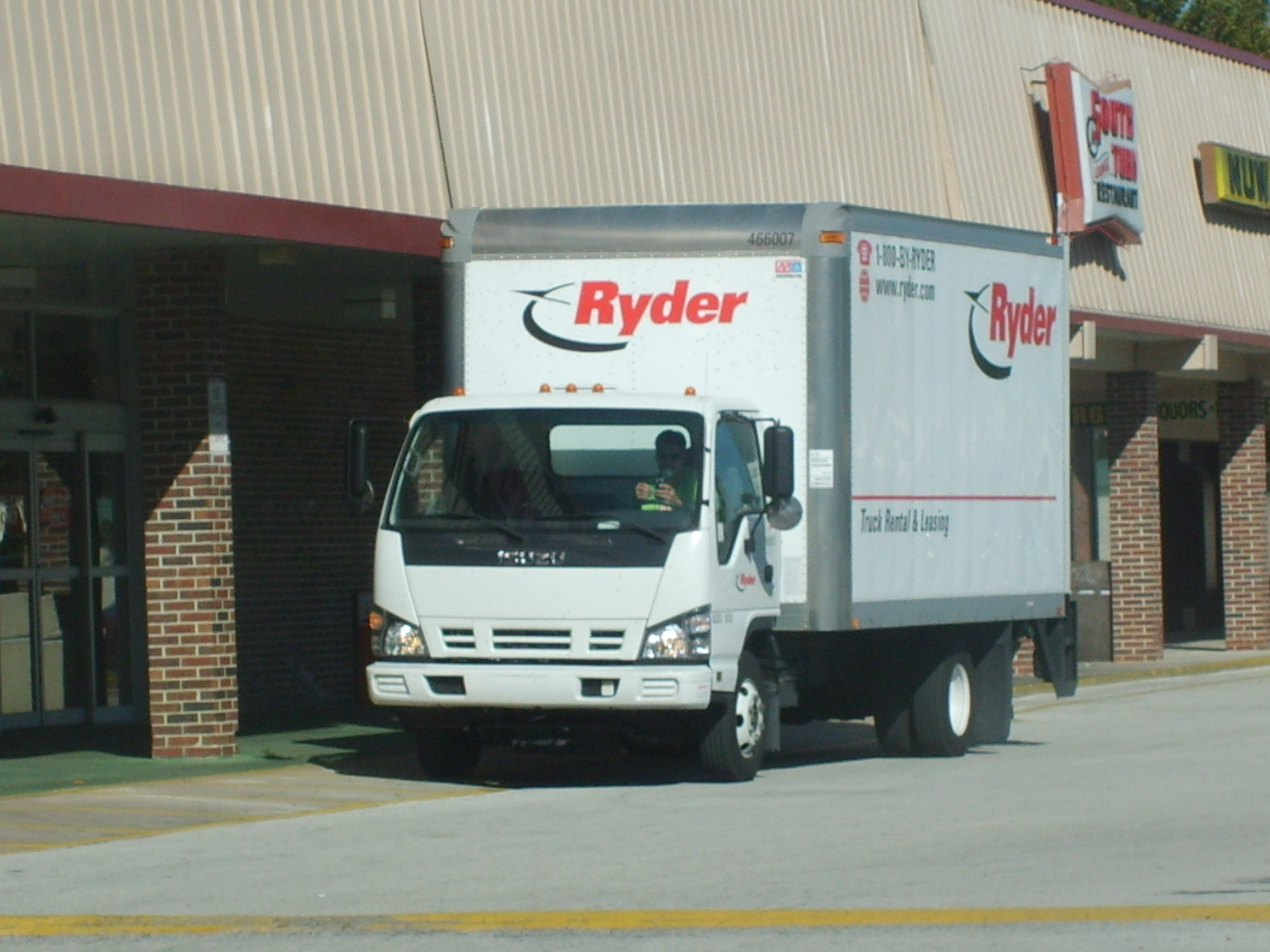
An Isuzu N-Series

Ryder System, Inc. is an American transportation company, specializing in truck rental and leasing, fleet management, supply chain management, and transportation management. It also offers full-service leasing, rental and maintenance, used vehicle sales, transportation management, professional drivers, e-commerce fulfillment, and last-mile delivery services. The company is headquartered in Coral Gables, Florida, and operates in the United States and United Kingdom.

== History ==
Ryder was founded in Miami, Florida, in 1933 by James Ryder as a concrete hauling company with one truck, a 1931 Model "A" Ford. In 1938, Ryder signed a five-truck lease deal with Champagne Velvet Beer, increasing Ryder's fleet to 20 trucks. By the following year, the fleet had more than 50 trucks. This led to Ryder changing its focus from distribution to leasing.

Ryder bought Great Southern Trucking Company in 1952. In 1955, Ryder System, Inc. was formed to combine Great Southern and Ryder Truck Rental. Ryder System went public in 1955. In the 1960s and 1970s, Ryder expanded into distribution and supply chain. James Ryder retired in 1978.

Ryder trucks rented by terrorists and filled with explosives were used as weapons in both the 1993 World Trade Center bombing and the 1995 Oklahoma City bombing, as well as vehicle-ramming attacks such as the 2018 Toronto van attack.

In 1996, Ryder decided to focus on commercial truck rental and leasing, and exited the "one-way" consumer truck rental business; which was purchased by equity firm Questor Partners Fund LP, who later sold it to Budget Truck Rental in June 1998.

In December 2011, the non-partisan organization Public Campaign criticized Ryder for spending $960,000 on lobbying and not paying any taxes during 2008 to 2010, instead getting $46 million in tax rebates, despite making a profit of $627 million.

In 2017 Ryder launched electric truck rentals in California, and Chicago, Illinois. The trucks were equipped with 70 kWh batteries, which had an estimated range of 100 miles. Ryder is the exclusive maintenance provider for Workhorse's electric fleet in North America, first launched in the San Francisco Bay area in 2018.

== Business ==
Ryder divides its business into three segments: Fleet Management Solutions, Supply Chain Solutions, and Dedicated Transportation Solutions. As of December 31, 2024, the total company revenue was $12.64 billion, with profits before income taxes of $661 million. The number of full-time employees, as of December 2024 was 50,700 globally, all of them in North America. The company employs approximately 13,400 drivers, 5,000 technicians and have approximately 34,0000 hourly employees in the U.S. About 3,800 of those are organized by labor unions.

=== Fleet management ===
Ryder's fleet management business is its largest business segment. This arm of the business does contract-based full-service leasing, contract maintenance, commercial rental and fleet support services. Under full-service leasing Ryder owns and maintains the trucks and the customer determines the destination. Commercial rentals are the white Ryder trucks which the contract customers can rent on a temporary basis. Ryder grew its North American rental fleet to nearly 30,000 vehicles in 2010 and 2011 raising the percentage of model year 2010 or newer vehicles in the fleet to more than 40 percent. Support services consist of insurance, vehicle permits, and fuel.

In April 2011 Ryder bought B.I.T. Leasing, from Hayward, California. Also in 2011 it acquired the full service leasing and rental business of Carmenita Leasing, Inc., located in Santa Fe Springs, California, and the full service lease, contract maintenance, commercial rental and dedicated contract carriage business, The Scully Companies, Inc., based in Fontana, California.

Launched in April 2018, the company operates a peer-to-peer truck-sharing platform, COOP, that allows owners of commercial vehicles to rent unused trucks and trailers to businesses. The program expanded to Florida in January 2019 and further expanded in Texas in February 2020. COOP by Ryder expanded fleet management services and bulk rentals nationwide in 2022. As of December 31, 2019, Ryder owned or leased 213,800 vehicles. As of January 2020, they were the largest truck supplier in the US.

=== Supply chain ===
This business consists of management of a customer's supply chain. Ryder managed over 50 million square feet (4,645,152 m^{2}) of warehouse space on December 31, 2019. In December 2010 Ryder bought TLC, a supply chain services company based in Holland, Michigan.

=== Dedicated Transportation Solutions ===
Ryder Dedicated Transportation Solutions accounted for 15% of its revenue for a total of $346 million for Q4 2019. This arm of the business conducts both leasing and supply chain management. In 2013, Ryder launched a new name and identity for this program called Ryder Dedicated. The company expanded its Last Mile Delivery service for bulky and large goods to 11 markets in North America. In February 2019 Ryder launched a program for e-commerce that allows manufacturers to ship directly to consumers instead of using third-party shipping for small to large products. In May 2020 the company added food-grade capabilities to its e-commerce service.

=== Sponsorships ===
==== Motorsports ====
In March 2025, Ryder signed a deal to sponsor NASCAR Craftsman Truck Series team Reaume Brothers Racing's No. 33 truck driven by Frankie Muniz.

== Acquisitions and partnerships ==
In 2008, Ryder acquired three regional competitors: Pollock NationaLease, Lily Transportation and Gator Leasing. In April 2018, Ryder acquired Ohio-based MXD Group, an e-commerce fulfillment and last mile delivery provider with a network of 109 fulfillment centers across the United States and Canada. In May of that year, Ryder introduced RyderGyde™, a smartphone app for drivers and fleet managers to monitor and manage their fleets. In November 2018, the company ordered 1,000 electric trucks to add to their fleet.

In May 2020 RyderShare was introduced as a collaborative logistics platform. In January 2020 Ryder began a partnership with In-Charge Energy, Inc. and ABB, a provider of industrial automation and technology to provide electric vehicle charging to Ryder's customers. In June 2020 Ryder began a partnership with Turvo, a provider of collaborative logistics software

In January 2022, Ryder completed the acquisition of Whiplash (formerly Port Logistics Group) for approximately $480 million in cash. In October 2023, Ryder acquired Impact Fulfillment Services to add contract packaging and manufacturing capabilities.

In February 2024, Ryder acquired Cardinal Logistics, a North Carolina–based company. In January 2026, it was announced Ryder had acquired Truck Service Depot, an Atlanta-based mobile maintenance provider for commercial trucks and trailers. The acquisition expanded Ryder’s retail mobile maintenance operations in Georgia, with Truck Service Depot’s employees and facilities integrated into Ryder’s business; financial terms were not disclosed.

== Locations ==
Previously Ryder had its headquarters in Doral, Florida. As of December 31, 2019, Ryder had 524 locations in 50 US States and Puerto Rico. This includes a Shared Services Center in Alpharetta, Georgia, that employs over 500 people and provides support to all FMS operations. Ryder opened a new logistics center in London, Ontario, Canada, in January 2018.

The company announced the planned opening of two multi-client facilities in Perris, California and Fort Worth, Texas, while expanding an already existing Ryder warehouse in Douglassville, Pennsylvania. The three facilities were expected to be fully operational by May 2019. In May 2020 the company began to expand its e-commerce network with the opening of a new facility in Philadelphia and adding FDA approval for food-grade service to two other facilities in Perris, California and Dallas, Texas.
