= ACE Rent a Car =

American car rental company

ACE Rent A Car Reservations, Inc.
- Type: Private
- Industry: Car rental
- Founded: 1966; 60 years ago
- Founders: Robert Sorensen
- Headquarters: Indianapolis, Indiana, U.S.
- Number of locations: 200+
- Key people: Richard Radzis (chairman & CEO); Kevin Stutz (president); Ceven Goodman (vice president); Charlie Mullen (COO); Julie Ray (CAO)
- Revenue: ▲US$187 million (2025)
- Website: acerentacar.com

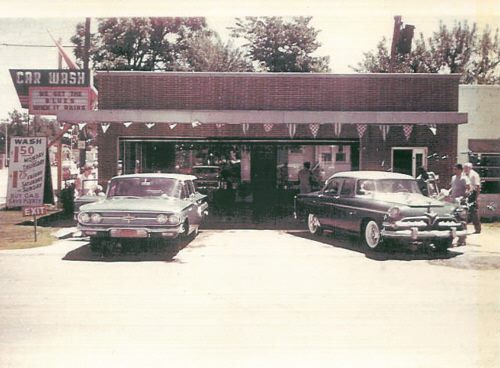
First car rental location owned by Sorensen and Osterand, located at 3433 W. 16th Street in Indianapolis (1966).

ACE Rent A Car Reservations, Inc. is a privately held car rental company founded in 1966 and based in Indianapolis, Indiana.

== History ==
Robert Sorensen and Ken Osterand, native Chicagoans and lifelong friends, first ventured into business together by opening two car washes in Indianapolis (5800 W. Washington St. & 3433 W. 16th St.) under the name, Speedway Auto Laundry, in 1957.

In 1966, in order to meet the demand for car rental from the surrounding neighborhoods, the two men added 10 Volkswagens to their business, operating under the Airways Rent A Car brand until 1969.

Later that year, with an interest in expanding their operations to the Indianapolis International Airport, Sorensen, Osterand and nine other Airways Rent A Car operators, broke away from the Airways system and co-founded the now defunct American International (AI) Rent a Car franchise system.

Osterand retired in 1978, leaving Sorensen the sole owner, and by 1986, his operations had grown to several locations throughout Indiana and the Chicago area. It was in that year, after several years of experimentation and dissatisfaction with the system, that Sorensen finally broke off from AI and launched the ACE Rent A Car brand. In doing so, ACE, under Sorensen's leadership, became an early adopter of the emerging Global Distribution Systems (GDS), such as Sabre, PARS, and Apollo. This level of brand exposure helped lay the foundation for the launch of ACE's licensee network that same year.

Following Sorensen's death in 1995, his nephew Richard Radzis and long-time employee, Charlie Mullen, took over as primary owners. Over the next 19 years, Radzis and Mullen expanded the footprint of their 3,000 vehicle business into Arizona, Minnesota and Texas, before selling their rental operations to Avis Budget Group in 2014, while still retaining ownership of the ACE Rent A Car brand, licensee system and proprietary software.

As of 2025, the ACE Rent A Car brand had more than 170 licensed locations in over 55 countries, and is the largest system of independent rental car operators in the world.

== Awards ==
In 2011, ACE was ranked highest in customer satisfaction in the J.D. Power & Associates annual industry consumer survey. In 2012, ACE was named one of fifty J.D. Power Customer Service Champions across twenty service industries.

Year	Publication	Award	Ref.
2011	J.D. Power & Associates	Highest in Customer Satisfaction	
2012	J.D. Power & Associates	Customer Service Champion	
2024	Newsweek	America's Best Customer Service	
2025	Newsweek	America's Best Customer Service	
2025	Time	World's Best Brands	
2025	USA Today	America's Best Loyalty & Rewards Programs	
2026	Newsweek	America's Best Customer Service	
2026	USA Today	America's Best Loyalty & Rewards Programs	
