= Avis Europe =

British car rental company

Avis Europe plc
- Type: Private
- Industry: Car rental
- Founded: 1986; 40 years ago
- Headquarters: Bracknell, Berkshire, England
- Key people: Alun Cathcart (chairman); Pascal Bazin (CEO)
- Revenue: €1.521 billion (2010)
- Operating income: €108.2 million (2010)
- Net income: €28.8 million (2010)
- Number of employees: 5,163 (2010)
- Parent: Avis Budget Group
- Website: www.avisbudgetgroup.com

Avis Europe plc is a United Kingdom-based company which holds the licence to operate the two main vehicle rental brands of Avis Budget Group (Avis Car Rental and Budget Rent a Car) in Europe, the Middle East and Africa as well as Asia in the case of Avis. In 2011 it was acquired by Avis Budget Group.

== History ==
The company was an operating division of Avis Rent a Car until 1986, when it was spun out and listed on the London Stock Exchange. The firm was then acquired by a consortium of Avis Group, General Motors and D'Ieteren in 1989 before being listed on the LSE once more in 1997. While Avis and GM sold their stakes in Avis Europe, D'Ieteren continued to hold a controlling 59.6% stake in the firm.

In 2003, shortly after Budget was acquired by Avis's then-parent Cendant, Avis Europe also took over the rights to that brand in its operating regions (except Asia).

In October 2011, Avis Europe was re-acquired by the brand's current parent company, Avis Budget Group, for US$1 billion.

== Management ==
	Role	Salary	Bonus	Total
Martyn Smith	Finance director	£330,000	£33,000	£363,000

== Operations ==
The group's Avis-branded operations comprise over 2,900 offices in 112 countries across Europe, the Middle East and Africa and Asia. Of these, franchisees operate by licence in 99 nations, while Avis Europe has directly owned and operated subsidiaries in the remaining thirteen (mostly in Western Europe).

The group has Budget-branded operations at over 900 sites in 66 countries across EMEA (Avis Budget Group operates Budget in Asia). All of these are franchised except for those in Austria, Switzerland, France and the United Kingdom.

== See also ==
- Lex Autolease
