= Domino's Pizza Israel =

Israeli franchise of Domino's Pizza

Domino's Pizza Israel (דּוֹמִינוֹ'ס פִיצָה)

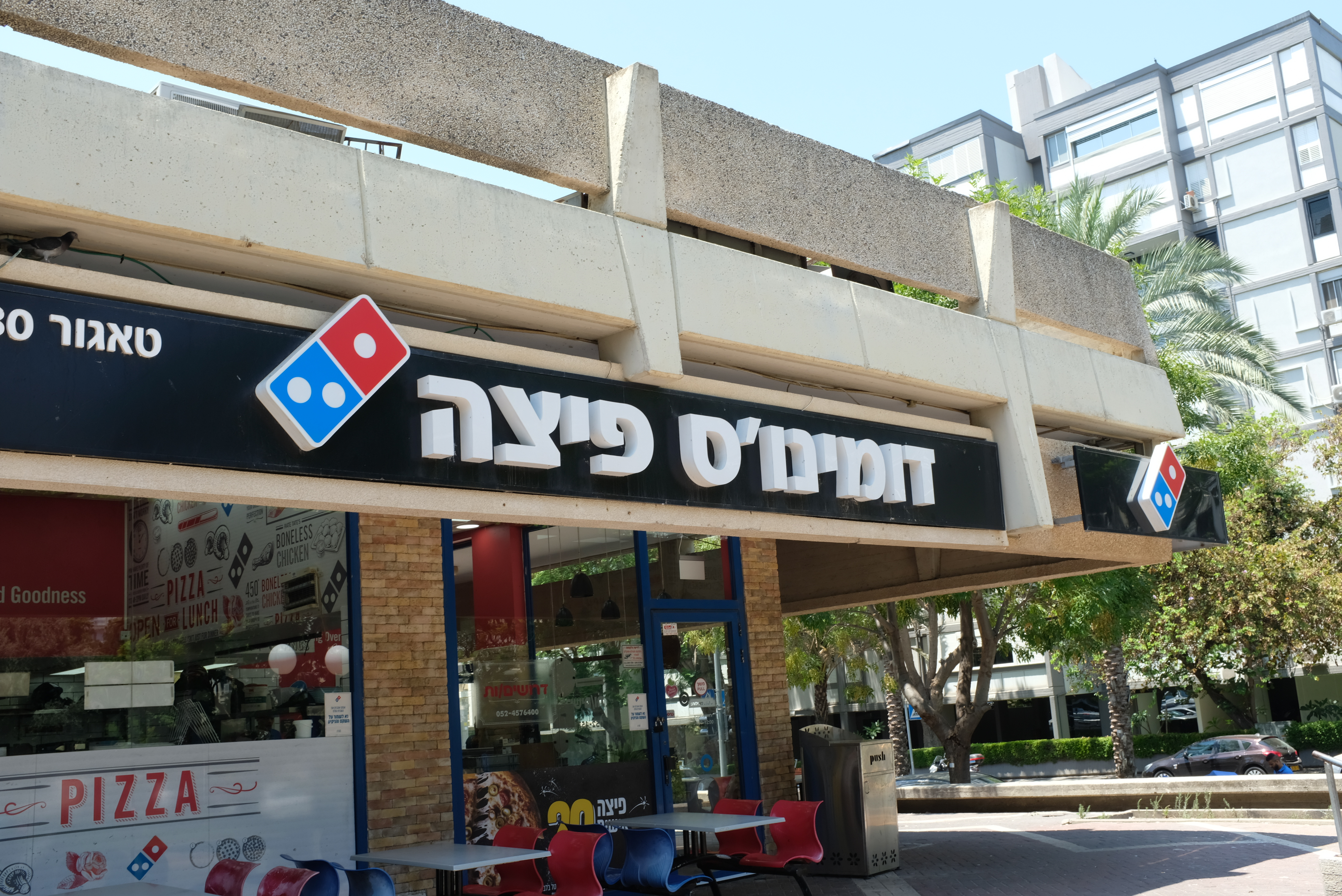
- Domino's Pizza in Tel Aviv, Israel
- Industry: Fast-food restaurant
- Founded: Israel (1993; 33 years ago)
- Headquarters: Israel
- Number of locations: 33 (August 2014)
- Area served: Israel
- Key people: CEO - Yossi Elbaz
- Products: Pizza
- Number of employees: 1,250
- Parent: Elgad Pizza
- Website: www.dominos.co.il/

Domino's Pizza Israel (Hebrew: דּוֹמִינוֹ'ס פִיצָה) is the Israeli subsidiary of the pizza chain Domino's Pizza, run by master franchisee Elgad Pizza with 33 branches throughout Israel.

== History ==
Domino's Pizza Israel was founded in 1990, and opened their first branch in Israel in 1993.

In November 2003, master franchisee, Omni Food Products declared bankruptcy. Top bidder for the franchise was Morag Group at NIS 5.9 million ($1.9 million), however Omni felt the franchise should go to general manager Asaf Greenberg The master franchise was eventually sold to Greenberg as well as two of the main franchise owners.

Despite discontinuing the promotion in the United States due to safety concerns, Domino's in Israel still offer a 30-minute delivery guarantee.

== Labor issues ==
In April 2014, employees protested in several locations around Israel, including outside the CEO's house. In many branches, signs were posted saying that Domino's would view those who cancel their union membership as loyal employees. Some branches were reportedly not allowing employees who were union members in to work.

== Innovation ==
In December 2013, Domino's Pizza Israel, was the first Domino's location internationally to unveil vegan pizza, which uses a soy-based cheese substitute.

== Kashrut ==
Despite being located in Israel, a primarily Jewish country, almost none of the chain's locations are kosher. By not being kosher, Domino's is able to remain open 7 days a week as well as offering meat toppings and meat products such as wings, which are added to almost a third of the chain's sales. Due to this, Domino's operates mostly in secular areas of Israel where the majority of people do not keep kosher.

== Facebook page hijacking ==
On 14 July 2014, during Operation Protective Edge Hamas hijacked Domino's Pizza Israel's Facebook page to announce they would be firing rockets at Tel Aviv and Haifa.

== See also ==
- Culture of Israel
- Israeli cuisine
- Economy of Israel
- List of pizza chains
- List of restaurants in Israel
