= Payless Car Rental =

American car rental brand

Payless Car Rental, Inc.
- Type: Subsidiary
- Industry: Car rental
- Founded: 1971; 55 years ago, in Spokane, Washington, U.S.
- Founder: John Les Netterstron
- Headquarters: St. Petersburg, Florida, U.S.,
- Number of locations: 167 (2015)
- Area served: Worldwide
- Parent: Avis Budget Group
- Website: paylesscar.com

Payless Car Rental, Inc. is a car rental company owned by Avis Budget Group and headquartered in St. Petersburg, Florida. While mainly a franchise system, the company owns and operates several corporate locations. Payless Car Rental, Payless Car Sales, Payless Parking and REZlink International are sister companies under the umbrella of Avalon Global Group.

The Payless brand operates in North America, South America, and Europe. The company has 167 locations worldwide.

Payless was acquired by Avis Budget Group in 2013.

== History ==
Earlier Payless Car Rental logo

In 1971, John Les Netterstron opened the first Payless Car Rental location in Spokane, Washington. Under the direction of Netterstron, the company grew from a local car rental store to a franchise system with over 100 car rental offices throughout the United States. By 1987 the company acquired the U.S. portion of Canadian-based Holiday Rent a Car, at which time the company built its first automated central reservation system.

The first Payless image was created in 1989, which has endured to the present day with only minor changes. Payless opened its first two corporate stores in 2002, adding 4 more between 2004 – 2006. The company currently has corporate locations in Denver, Ft. Lauderdale, Las Vegas, Orlando, Phoenix and Tampa. In March 2009 Payless Car Rental was added to the Expedia Preferred Vendors view. Payless also offers rates through travel portals such as Orbitz, Priceline.com, Travelocity and Rentcars.com.

As of 2008, Payless provides car rental services in over 80 locations in 20 countries operating over 10,000 vehicles.

In July 2013, Avis Budget Group acquired Payless for reported cost of 50 million dollars.

== Vehicles ==
In order to keep costs low, Payless typically shares a fleet with other Avis Budget Group-owned companies, Avis Rent a Car, as well as Budget Rent a Car, in many locations. Payless uses sales techniques to maintain profitability, including offering fewer vehicle classes than other rental car companies.

== See also ==
- Transport
