= Budget Truck Rental =

American truck rental brand

Budget Truck Rental, LLC
- Type: Subsidiary
- Industry: Truck rental
- Founded: 1998; 28 years ago
- Headquarters: Parsippany, New Jersey, United States
- Key people: Brian Choi (CEO)
- Products: Rental trucks
- Revenue: US$374 million
- Number of employees: 1,100
- Parent: Avis Budget Group
- Website: budgettruck.com

Budget Truck Rental, LLC is the second largest truck rental company in the continental United States, with around 2,800 locations and 32,000 trucks across the country. Budget Truck Rental is owned and operated by Avis Budget Group, which was spun off from Cendant.

Budget Truck Rental has contracts with Ford, GMC, Navistar International and Isuzu to make their rental trucks.

Like other truck rental companies, Budget Truck sells customers moving supplies to help people move house. They have trucks 10 feet, 12 feet, 16 feet, and 24 feet in length.

== History ==
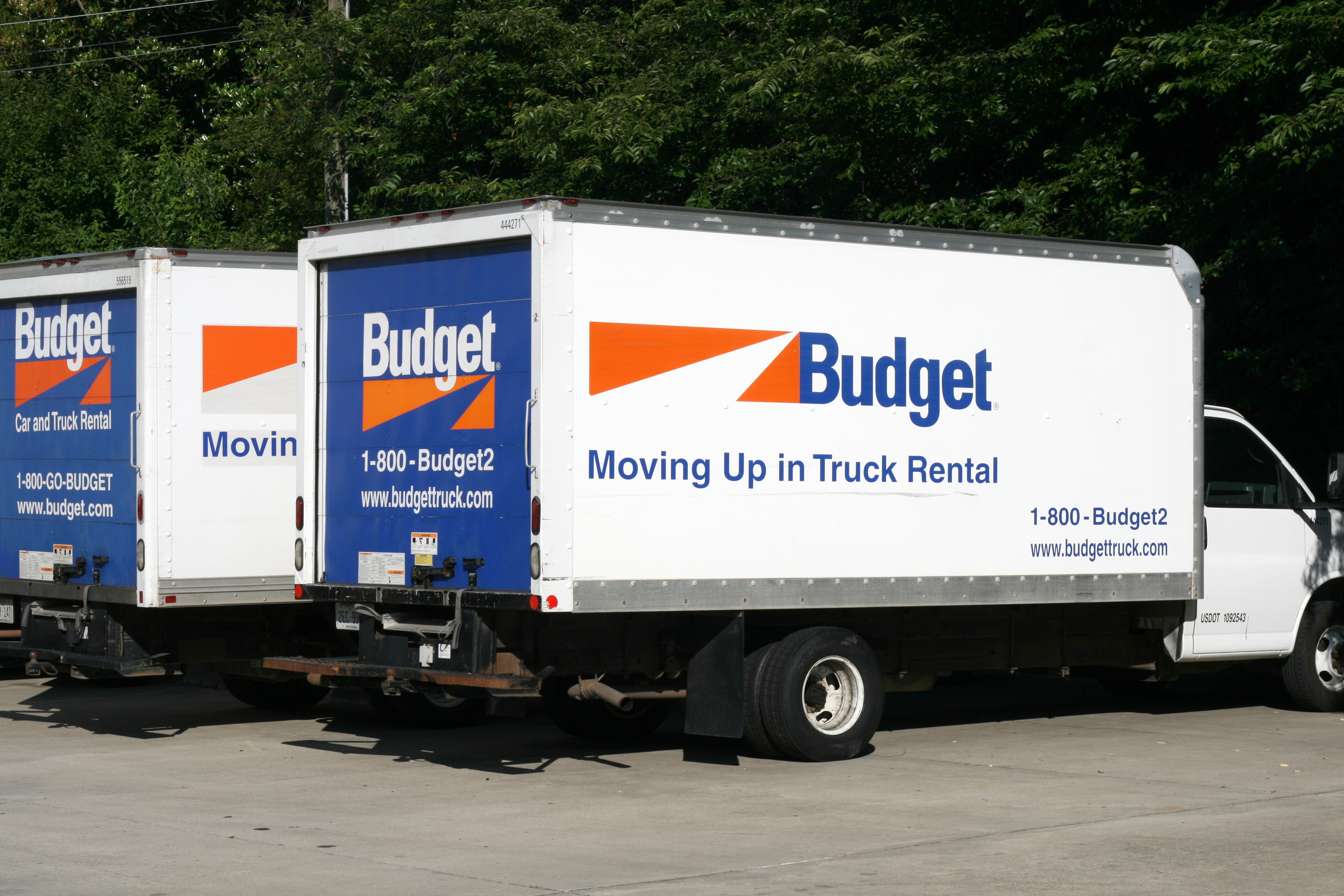
Two Budget rental trucks parked in Durham, North Carolina.

In the 2000 US Presidential Election, a Budget Truck Rental vehicle was used to deliver the deciding ballots from Palm Beach, Florida to Tallahassee, Florida. Budget Truck sold the truck that was used, donating US$67,100 to the American Red Cross from its sale.

In November 2002 Budget sold its truck and car businesses to Cherokee Acquisition Corporation, which is owned by Cendant Corporation.

In September 2006 Budget Rent a Car, Avis Rent a Car, and Budget Truck Rental were spun off by Cendant as a separate company, Avis Budget Group. In 2007, its headquarters was transferred to Morris County, New Jersey.
