= Warren Avis =

Founder of Avis Rent A Car System Inc.

- Born: August 4, 1915; Bay City, Michigan, U.S.
- Died: April 24, 2007 (age 91); Ann Arbor, Michigan, U.S.
- Occupation: Founder of Avis Car Rentals

Warren Edward Avis (August 4, 1915 – April 24, 2007) was an American entrepreneur who founded Avis Car Rentals in 1946.

== Biography ==
Born in Bay City, Michigan, Avis graduated from Bay City Central High School in 1933. He served in the United States Army Air Forces during the World War II as a bombardier and became a captain. When he got out, he bought a stake in a Ford dealership and began his plan to rent cars at airports. He said that he got the idea when as a pilot he could not find ground transport at airports.

Although he did not technically invent the rental car business, he ensured its future by deciding to locate his offices at airports instead of the downtown areas or central business districts where others were then located. Avis opened Avis Rent A Car at Willow Run Airport in Ypsilanti, Michigan and at Miami International Airport in Florida. He sold the company in 1954 for $8 million. Avis established his business credentials by positioning himself as a capable negotiator between the major automotive companies and their union leaders and rank-and-file members. His unique approach, which became the subject for several of his books, involved soliciting ideas from an assembled group of stakeholders that could range from the C.E.O. to the lowest-level hourly worker, accept their ideas in anonymous fashion, combine them where overlapping and present them to the assembled group for discussion without attribution. Avis felt that ownership of ideas led to unnecessary championing by the idea's owner and that underlings would needlessly defer to upper-tier managers and executives. His process yielded spirited discussion by attendees and inevitable consensus in most instances on those ideas that prevailed.

Avis would later head Avis Enterprises which invested in high tech electronic companies. In addition his real estate holdings at what was known as Avis Farms on the south side of Ann Arbor, Michigan were converted to commercial offices and industrial parks. On his paternal side, Avis is distantly related to the Portuguese royal dynasty House of Aviz, who ruled Portugal in the 14th century. He was inducted into the Automotive Hall of Fame in 2000. He died at his home in Ann Arbor, Michigan of natural causes.
