= Avis Car Rental =

Global car rental brand

Avis Car Rental, LLC
- Type: Subsidiary
- Industry: Car rental, Franchising
- Founded: 1946; 80 years ago in Ypsilanti, Michigan, U.S.
- Founder: Warren Avis
- Headquarters: Parsippany, New Jersey, U.S.
- Number of locations: 5,500 (2019)
- Areas served: 165 countries
- Key people: Brian Choi (CEO)
- Services: Car rental, Subscription
- Revenue: US$5.3 billion (2019)
- Parent: Avis Budget Group
- Website: www.avisbudgetgroup.com

Avis logo used from 1964 until December 2012

Avis Car Rental, LLC is a global car rental company headquartered in Parsippany, New Jersey. Along with Budget Rent a Car, Budget Truck Rental and Zipcar, Avis is a unit of Avis Budget Group.

Avis Budget Group operates the Avis brand in North America, South America, Europe, India, Australia, New Zealand, and South Africa. In 2011, Avis acquired Avis Europe plc, which had been a separate corporation licensing the Avis brand.

Since the late 1970s, Avis has featured mainly General Motors (GM) vehicles such as Chevrolet, but today also rents other popular brands such as Ford and Toyota.

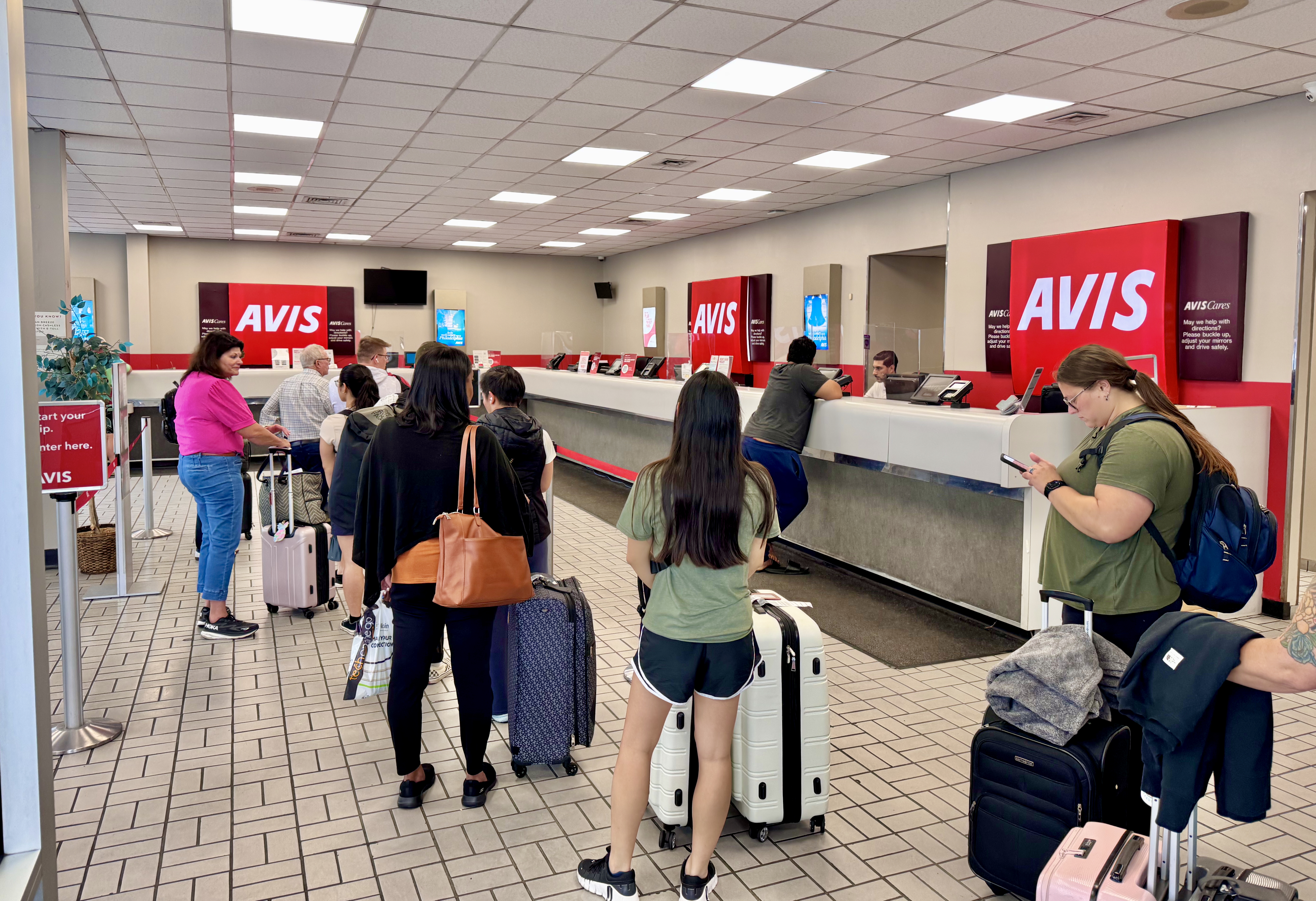
Avis at Philadelphia International Airport

Avis was the first car rental business to be located at an airport, and today is a provider to the commercial segment serving business travelers at major airports internationally, and to leisure travelers at off-airport locations. Many of the off-airport locations are franchised operations rather than company-owned and operated, as is the case with most airport locations. In January 2013, the company agreed to acquire Zipcar for $491 million.

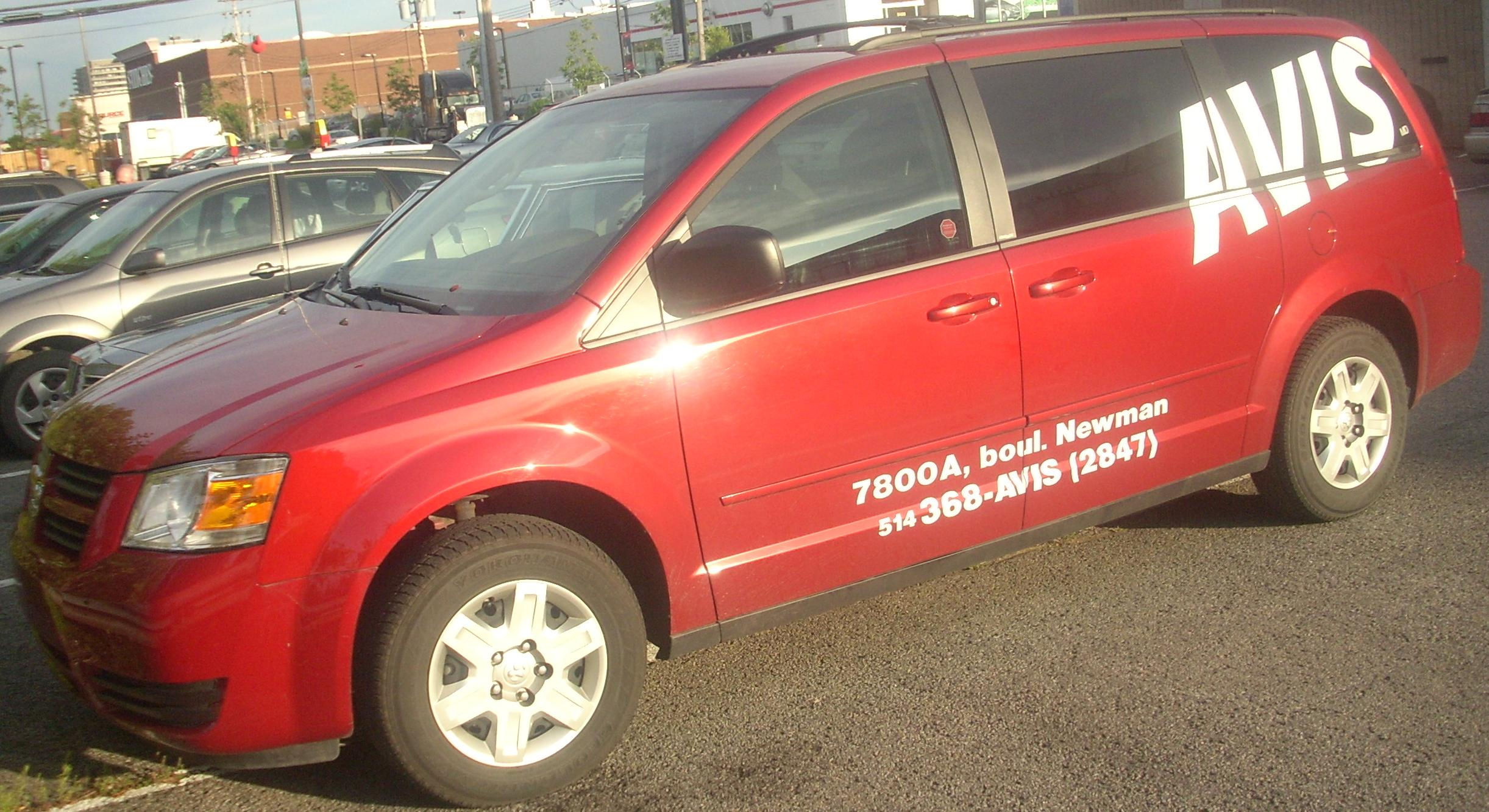
A Dodge Grand Caravan from Avis

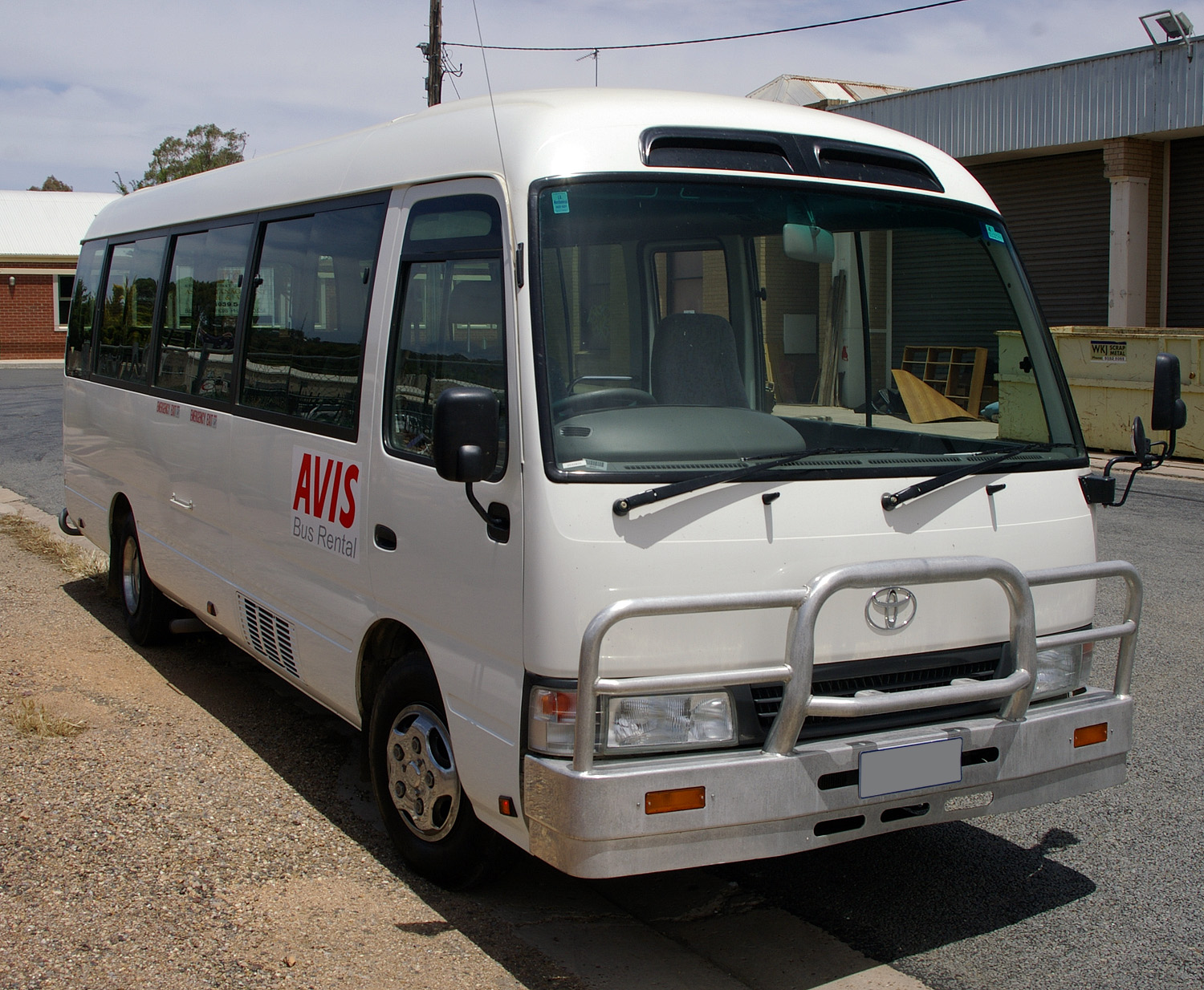
Toyota Coaster from Avis

== History ==
The company was founded in 1946 with three cars at Willow Run Airport, Ypsilanti, Michigan, by Warren Avis (August 4, 1915 – April 24, 2007). It established branch operations across the United States over the next few years, becoming the second largest car rental company in the country by 1953. By its tenth anniversary in 1956 it had opened its first international offices in Europe, Canada and Mexico.

The Avis corporate motto of "We Try Harder" was adopted in 1962, during CEO Robert Townsend's tenure, who transformed the company. The campaign aimed to put a positive spin on Avis' status as the second largest car rental company in the United States, at the expense of its larger competitor, Hertz. The slogan was used for 50 years before a re-branding in 2012, when Avis unveiled a new slogan—"It's Your Space."

In 1972, Avis introduced Wizard, the first computer-based information and reservations system to be used in the United States car rental business; to this day, almost all frequent Avis customers are identified by their unique "Wizard number". In 1981, the company instituted its system of vehicle tracking, that was named Advanced Vehicle Identification System (AVIS).

Avis has been owned by a number of other companies over the years, along with several periods of being a public company. These include:

- 1956: The Amoskeag Company
- 1962: Investment group Lazard Freres
- 1965: ITT Corporation
- 1977: Norton Simon
- 1983: Esmark
- 1984: Beatrice Foods
- 1986: Investment firm Wesray Capital Corporation
- 1987: Majority ownership under an Employee Share Ownership Plan
- 1989: General Motors (acquired 29% stake)
- 1996: HFS Corporation
- 2001: Cendant
- 2006: Avis Budget Group
