= Avis Budget Group =

Holding company of several car rental brands

Avis Budget Group, Inc.

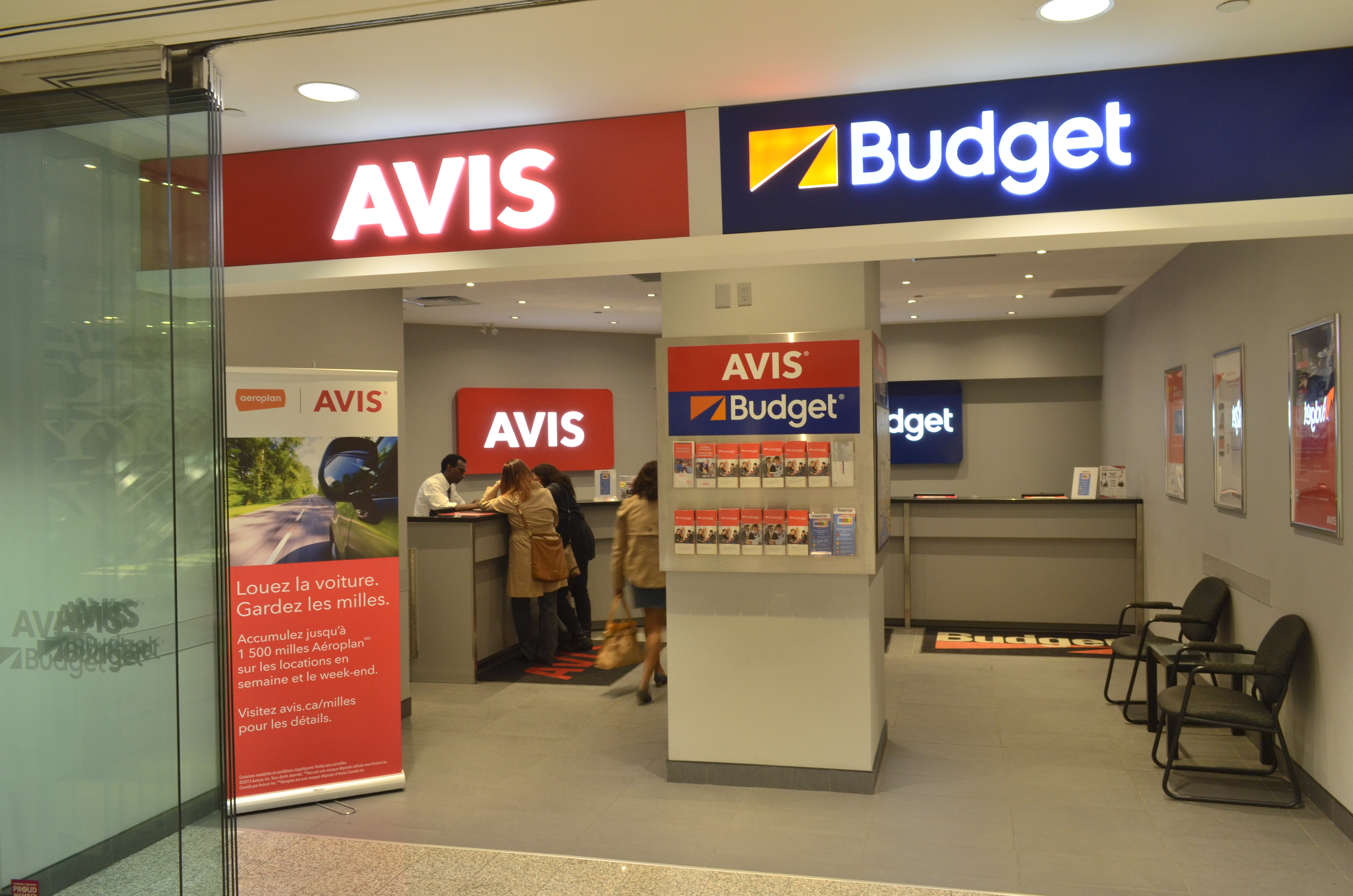
- An Avis Budget Group location in Toronto
- Type: Public
- Traded as: Nasdaq: CAR; DJTA component; S&P 400 component
- Industry: Rental; leasing services
- Predecessor: Cendant
- Founded: 2006; 20 years ago
- Founders: Henry Silverman; Warren Avis; Julius Lederer
- Headquarters: Parsippany, New Jersey, United States
- Number of locations: Approx. 10,000 (2025)
- Areas served: Worldwide
- Key people: Brian Choi (CEO); Daniel Cunha (EVP); Jagdeep Pahwa (Chairman of the Board and CFO)
- Services: Car and truck rentals
- Revenue: ▼US$11.652 billion (2025)
- Operating income: ▼US$−1.32 billion (2025)
- Net income: ▼US$−995 million (2025)
- Total assets: ▼US$31.2 billion (2025)
- Total equity: ▼US$−3.1 billion (2025)
- Number of employees: Approx. 25,000 (2026)
- Subsidiaries: Avis Car Rental; Budget Rent a Car; Budget Truck Rental; Payless Car Rental; Zipcar; Flexcar
- Website: avisbudgetgroup.com

Avis Budget Group, Inc. is an American car rental agency holding company headquartered in Parsippany, New Jersey. It is one of the three big rental car holding companies in the United States. In 2021, it held a 26% market share, placing it behind both the Hertz Global Holdings and Enterprise Holdings. It is the parent company of several brands including Avis Car Rental, Budget Rent a Car, Budget Truck Rental, Payless Car Rental, and Zipcar.

== History ==
Following the decision to dissolve the Cendant company name and split into four separate companies, the vehicle rental division of Cendant became Avis Budget Group in 2006.

In 2011, Avis Budget Group acquired Avis Europe, an independently owned company licensee, globally reuniting the Avis and Budget brands.

On September 5, 2012, Avis Budget Group acquired Apex Car Rentals of New Zealand.

On March 14, 2013, Avis Budget Group purchased carsharing company Zipcar for about US$500 million in cash.

On April 9, 2015, Avis Budget Group announced it had completed the acquisition of Maggiore Group, Italy's fourth-largest vehicle rental company.

During 2018 Avis along with 90 additional Fortune 500 companies "paid an effective federal tax rate of 0% or less" as a result of Donald Trump´s Tax Cuts and Jobs Act of 2017.

The company's stock value rose dramatically due to increased demand for car rentals during the COVID-19 pandemic and it became a meme stock in November 2021, with shares at one point doubling in a single day. In 2021, it held a 26% market share, placing it behind both the Hertz Global Holdings and Enterprise Holdings. Despite rising revenues, the value of the stock began to decline in 2024 due to rising federal interest rates and declining values for used cars.

== Operations ==
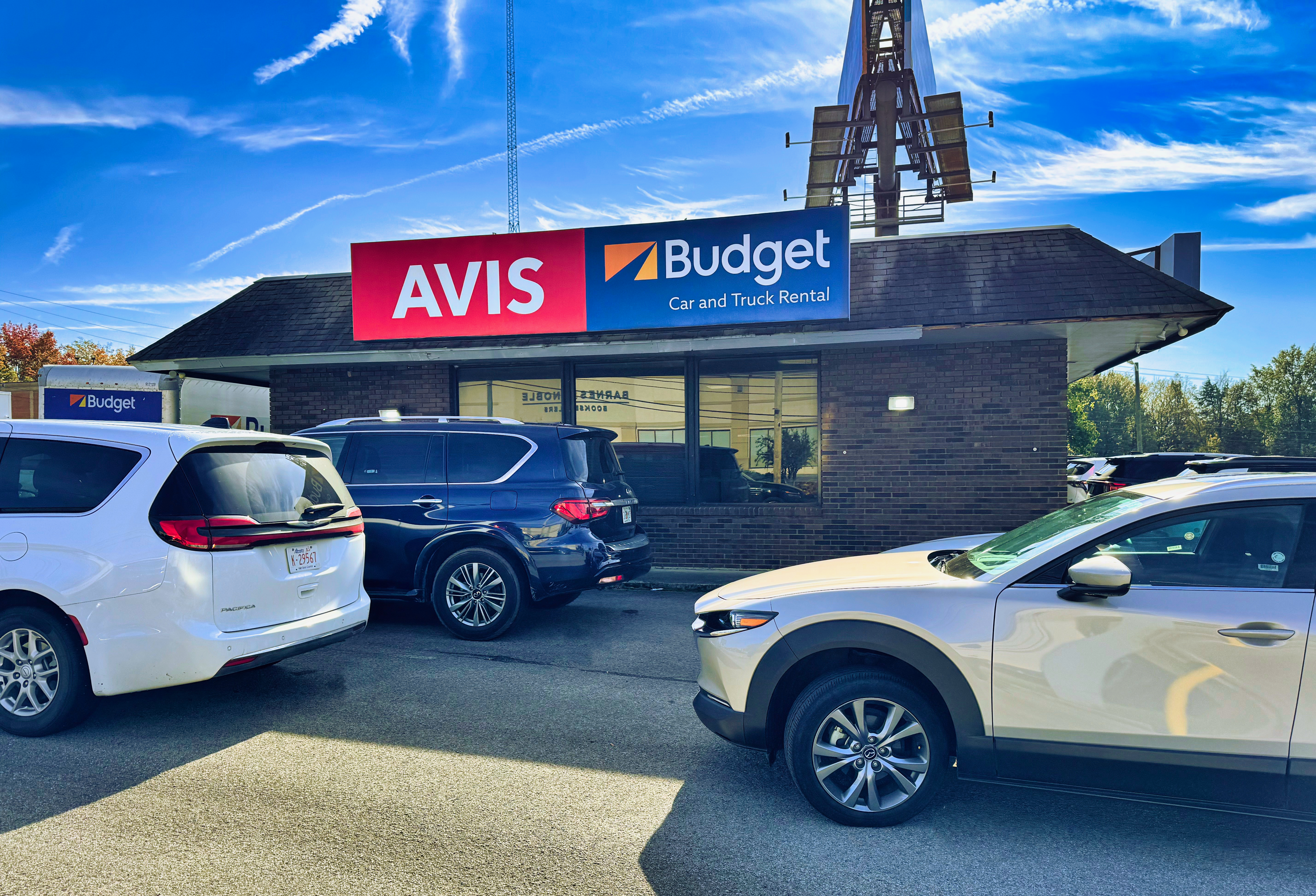
An Avis Budget Group location in Knoxville, Tennessee

Avis Budget Group is the parent company of several brands including Avis Car Rental, Budget Rent a Car, Budget Truck Rental, Payless Car Rental, and Zipcar. It also operates several smaller, regional brands including ACL Hire, Apex Car Rentals, AmicoBlu, France Cars, Maggiore Group, MoriniRent, TurisCar and TurisPrime. As of 2018, the company had over 600,000 cars in its fleet.
