= Pierre Balmain =

French fashion designer (1914–1982)

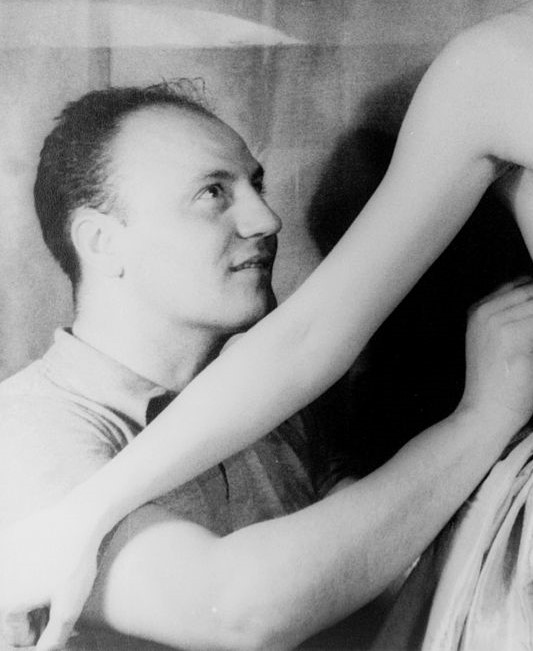
- Born: 18 May 1914; Saint-Jean-de-Maurienne, Savoie
- Died: 29 June 1982 (aged 68); Neuilly-sur-Seine, France
- Known for: Fashion Design
- Awards: Officier of the Legion of Honour; Knight of the Order of the Dannebrog; Knight of the Order of Merit of the Italian Republic; Grand Vermeil, Medal of the City of Paris

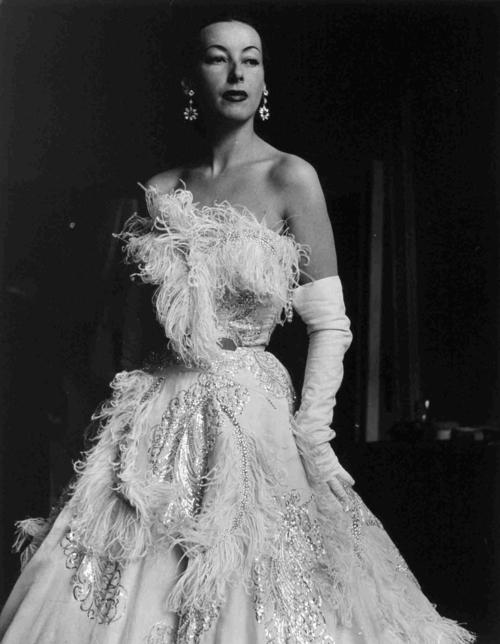
A 1955 Gown

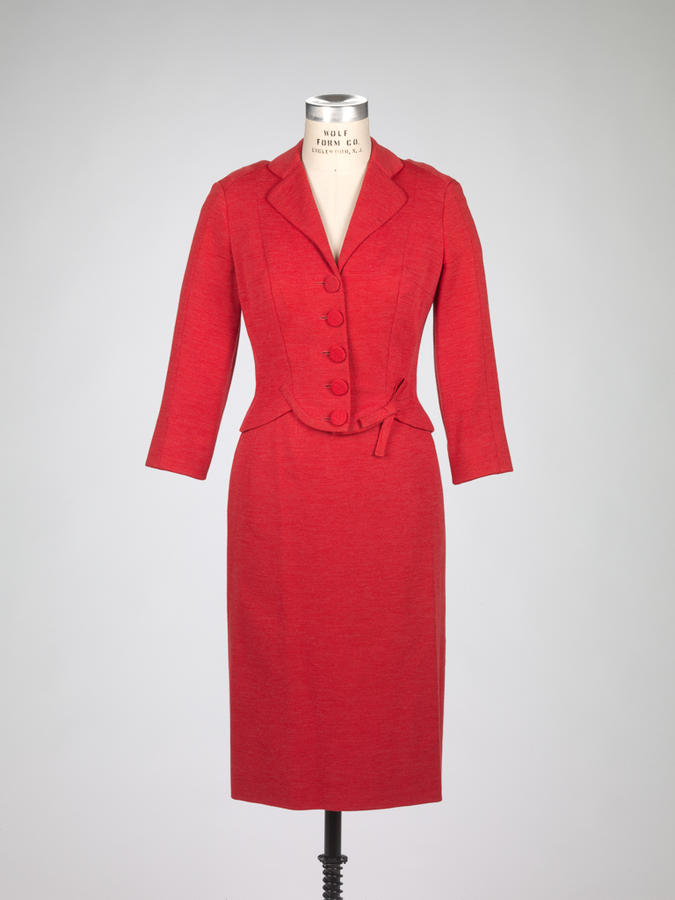
The Balmain Suit

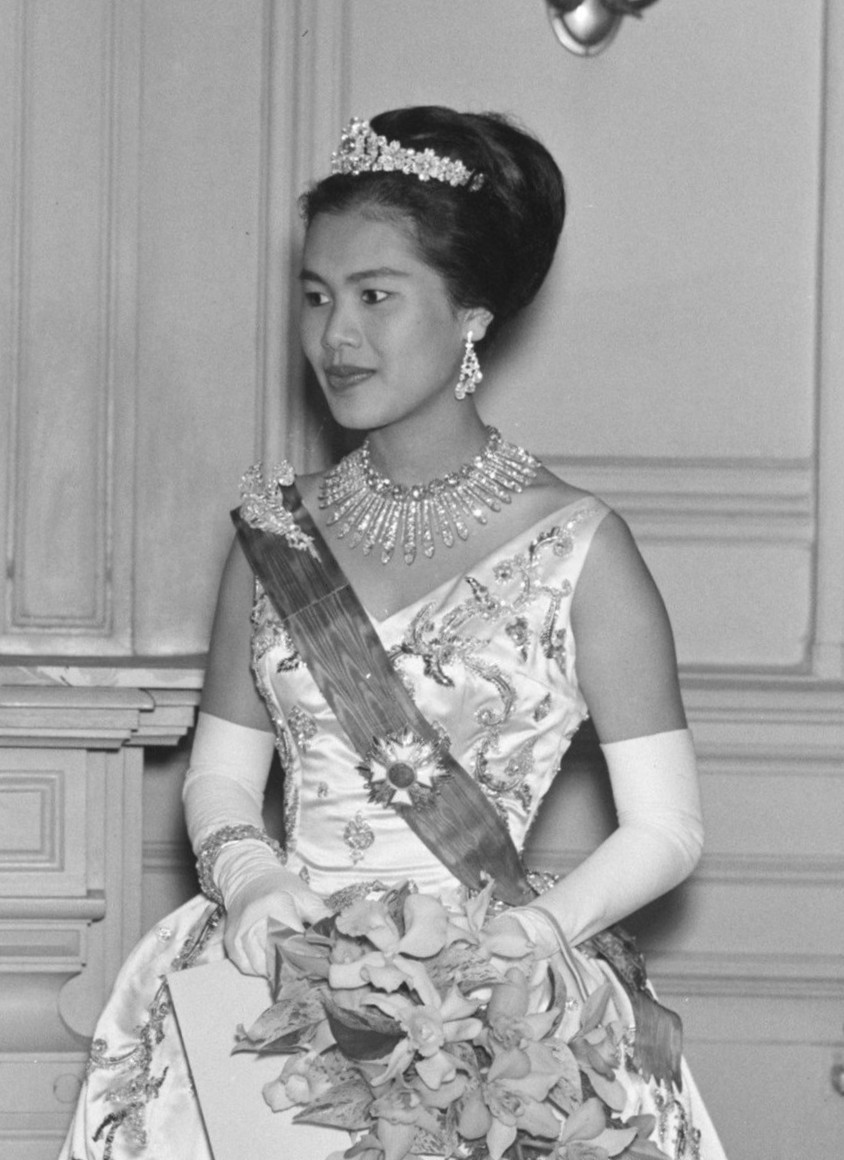
Thailand's Queen Sirikit in Balmain, The Hague 1960

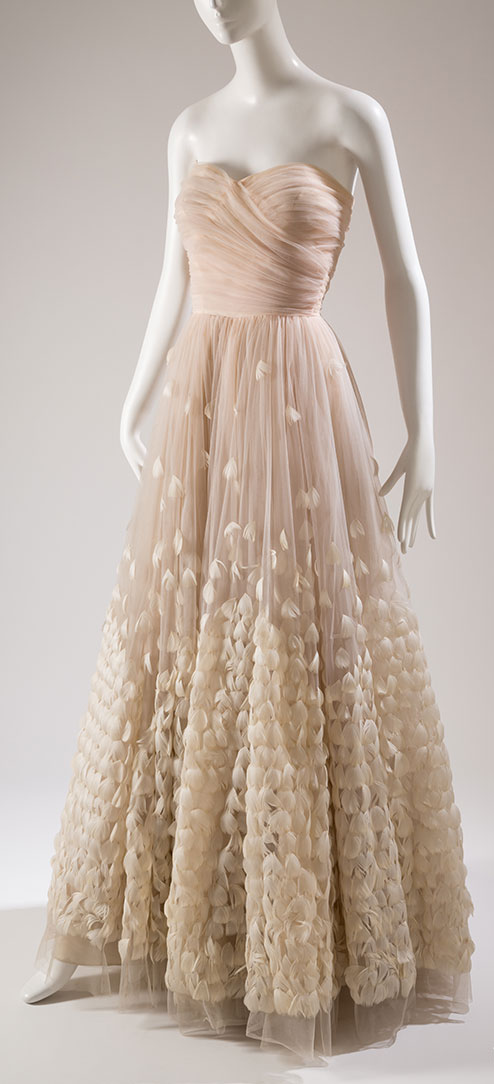
A Replica of Balmain's Angel Dress

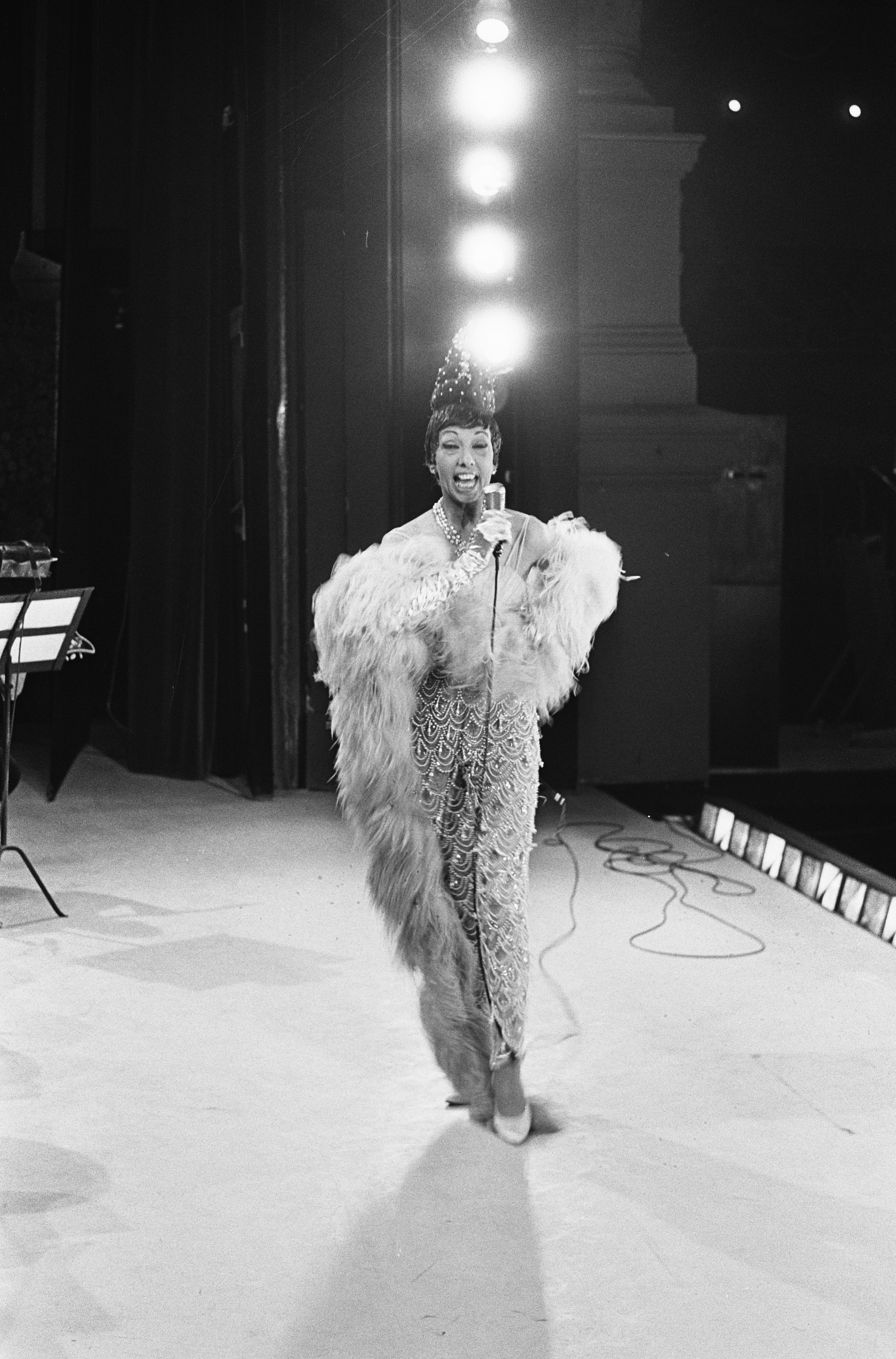
Josephine Baker in Balmain for her 1964 Revue

Pierre Alexandre Claudius Balmain (French pronunciation: [pjɛʁ balmɛ̃]; 18 May 1914 – 29 June 1982) was a French fashion designer and founder of leading post-war fashion house Balmain. He was one of the Big Four of 1950s haute couture, the others being Christian Dior, Jacques Fath and Jean Dessès.

== Early life ==
Balmain was born in Saint-Jean-de-Maurienne, an alpine community in southwest France. He was the only child of Maurice-Eugène, who owned a drapery business, and Françoise-Pierrette who, with her sisters, ran a fashion boutique called Galeries Parisiennes. His father died when he was seven and, at eleven, he won a scholarship to attend a boarding school at nearby Chambéry. On week-ends, an uncle would take him to Aix-les-Bains, a spa town half an hour away which, at the time, was the playground of the rich and famous. It was the Roaring Twenties, and members of high society from Europe, Britain and North America flocked to the town to enjoy the Grand Cercle Casino, the Aix-Les-Bains International tennis tournament, thermal spas and luxury hotels. Here, Balmain met many society women and was exposed to the dramatically changing fashions of the time. His inspirations were Madame Premet, Paul Poiret, Jean Patou, Coco Chanel and, especially, Jacques Doucet.

In 1933, at 19, he moved to Paris to study architecture at the École des Beaux-Arts. He met the designer Robert Piguet, who had just opened his atelier; Balmain sold him three fashion sketches. Realizing that he wanted a career in fashion, he left school and, in 1934, took a job with Edward Molyneux. In 1936, he was called for his mandatory military service, assigned first to the Air Force, then the Pioneers of the Foreign Legion and, at the outset of World War II, the Alpine defense force, Chasseurs Alpins with which he was mobilized in the Maurienne region. When France fell in 1940, he was demobilized and returned to Aix-les-Bains, where his mother now owned a boutique. There, he met Lucien Lelong, who offered him a job. Balmain returned to Paris.

== Career ==
Edward Molyneux taught Balmain a crucial lesson of fashion design: "to strip away anything non-essential...any ornamental detail is valid only if it makes a constructive contribution to the dress." Lelong taught him the business of fashion. Balmain had retail and sales experience from working at his mother's boutiques but Lelong was the master. At the time, Lelong was president of the Chambre Syndicale de la Couture, having developed his parents' small dressmaking business into one of the most successful fashion houses of its time. In the 1920s, he had pioneered the practice of offering discounts to society ladies who would wear his clothes, and agree to be photographed in them. In 1934, he had launched the first ready-to-wear line by a haute couture house, and he had an international perfume division. He managed design, production, quality control, personnel and marketing. Having worked in fashion through one war, he was expert at managing tight supply chains. And he was a diplomat; when the Germans occupied Paris in 1940, it was Lelong who convinced them to keep the fashion houses open. Lelong did not design clothes; he hired designers and jump-started the careers of Christian Dior and Hubert de Givenchy, among others. These are the people Balmain was designing with and they were all learning from Lelong. It's telling that Balmain's most successful design while at Lelong was a simple black dress called "Petit Profit" ("Small Profit"), and that he carefully recorded that it was ordered by 360 clients. At war's end, and as Lelong's retirement approached, Balmain was ready to go out on his own.

== House of Balmain ==
In early 1945, Balmain opened House of Balmain at 44 rue François-Ier, in the Paris luxury district known as the 'Golden Triangle'; his mother sold her boutique to become his investor and he was able to hire 16 seamstresses. The building was very grand—it belonged to the family of The Princesse de Broglie, and Balmain made it more grand with lavish decoration and furnishings. He had his first show in his atelier on October 12, 1945 and, with 50 models, showed flannel trousers, loose homespun Breton jackets, large woollen kimonos trimmed with black Persian lamb, and luxurious brocade dresses. That collection was showcased in Vogue, and fashion writers wrote impressive reviews. Also promoting the collection was Balmain's closest friend, the American writer and art collector Gertrude Stein. They met in Aix-les-Bains in 1939, and Stein liked to tell people that, during the war, Balmain had made clothes for her. As an art collector, and host of famous artistic and literary salons, Stein brought with her a long list of wealthy clients. Thanks to Stein, Time printed a photo of one of his dresses, and he was being talked about—four clients to come from his first show were Josephine Baker, Helena Rubinstein, Wallis Simpson, Duchess of Windsor, and the wife of the King of Belgium, Lilian Baels. In tribute to the Duchess, in every show for the rest of his career, Balmain included one outfit in her favorite combination, navy blue and black.

In 1947, Dior introduced the "New Look", which was long bell-shaped skirts cascading from small waists. Balmain was already doing that. He also introduced a classic two-piece suit, softening the angular 1940s lines with relaxed skirts and adding his signature six-button tailored jackets. He made shift dresses and fur shawls acceptable for day wear, paired slimline dresses with jackets and large hats, and became the leader of the post-war style dubbed "Jolie Madame". His called dress-making "the architecture of movement" and introduced opulence and luxury that was also practical and comfortable. He also immediately introduced best-selling perfumes. Through Piguet, he had met the perfumer Germaine Cellier and the two would work together for three decades, releasing Elysees 64-83 (1946), Vent Vert (1947), Balmain (1948), and Jolie Madame (1953). In 1960, Balmain sold Les Parfums Pierre Balmain of Paris to Revlon, but he continued to create the fragrances that bore his name: Monsieur Balmain (1964), Miss Balmain (1967), Ivoire de Balmain (1979) and Ébène (1983).

In 1946, after a highly-successful show which was reviewed by Stein's partner Alice B. Toklas and published as A New French Style: Eight Models from Pierre Balmain, Balmain visited New York for the first time. Following Lelong's philosophy on promoting French culture, and at Stein's urging, he took the position that he was acting as an ambassador. For the rest of his life, he would travel to the US on business, but also to tour the country, giving lectures to clubs and girls’ colleges. He found the New York market "fascinating", opened his first New York store in 1949, and was soon creating lines specifically for American women, as well as adapting French fashion for them; in 1961, for example, his homespun Breton jacket became the "Manhattan Coat". His products were available throughout the US and Canada, in department stores such as Jordan Marsh, Eaton's and B. Altman. In 1955, he won the prestigious Neiman Marcus Fashion Award. He did the same thing for Australian women, touring the country, in designing an Australian line and establishing himself in Australian stores.

In 1951, Balmain launched a ready-to-wear line, which included suits, gowns, coats, furs and sportswear. By now, he employed several designers as assistants, including Gérard Pipart, John Cavanagh, and Karl Lagerfield. Through the 1950s, Balmain's designs were seen world-wide as he established close relationships with women such as Ingrid Bergman, Vivien Leigh and Bronwen Astor, who became one of his muses—another was Gina Lollobrigida, who was partial to his beaded dresses. He designed the wedding gowns for Patrice Wymore when she married Errol Flynn, and for Audrey Hepburn when she married Mel Ferrer. In 1955, he employed 600 seamstresses in 12 ateliers.

In 1958, it was decided that Thailand's King Bhumibol Adulyadej and his wife, Queen Sirikit, would embark on a six-month tour of the United States and 15 European nations, with the goal of strengthening international relations and introducing Thai culture. At the time, Thailand had no "national costume", so Sirikit created "Chut Thai Phra Ratcha Niyom" (Royal Favored Thai Dress), a set of eight luxurious gowns which represented Thai women and cultural history. Balmain was chosen to create the gowns, and her entire wardrobe for the trip. Using Thai silks, he made tailored suits, cocktail dresses, and evening gowns, in addition to the Chut Thai. When the tour took place in 1960, the international media was captivated, with The New York Times writing that "Thailand has found a new language, elegance." It is estimated that over 1,000 photographs of the tour were printed in the western media.

By 1960, the age of the working woman was pushing out the age of glamour, and couture was no longer practical. Balmain focused on keeping his brand afloat. The sale of the fragrance division provided a much-needed cash infusion, and financing for the sportswear and ready-to-wear lines. In the '60s and '70s, he undertook several high-profile commercial projects; in 1968, he created the delegates' uniforms for the 1968 Winter Olympics in Grenoble. He also designed the new uniforms for the "Singapore Girls", the flight attendants of Singapore Airlines. In the '70s, he would design the uniform for Air France's first female pilot, Danielle Décuré, and the uniform for women in the French civil service. In 1971, he opened a menswear store in New York. In 1977, Balmain sold House of Balmain to Léo Gros, head of the knitwear company Montagut. Balmain stayed on as creative director until his death.

== Personal life and death ==
Balmain had three homes. In Paris, he lived in the Walter Buildings, at 6 Boulevard Suchet in the La Muette district. He also owned two country houses; a chateau in Croissy-sur-Seine and the modernist Villa Balmain in the village of Poggio on the Isle of Elba, which he designed in 1960 with architect Leonardo Ricci.

In 1947, Balmain hired an assistant, the young Danish designer Erik Mortensen (1926-1998). They became lovers and collaborators and would remain so for the rest of Balmain's life. Balmain died of liver cancer at the American Hospital of Paris in Neuilly-sur-Seine, age 68. His ashes were scattered by Mortensen, in the Maurienne valley, at the foot of the Saint-Sorlin-d'Arves glacier.

== Costume design ==
In 1947, Balmain began designing costumes for stage and screen, always for the films' leading ladies; in total, he dressed actresses for 88 films. In some cases, as with Nadia Gray and Lilli Palmer, it was at the request of the actress. He usually provided dresses and/or gowns; in some cases, he designed full wardrobes, as in The Deep Blue Sea for Vivien Leigh, ...And God Created Woman for Brigitte Bardot, and Station Six-Sahara for Carroll Baker. For the stage, Balmain was nominated for the Tony Award for Best Costume Design and won the Drama Desk Award for Outstanding Costume Design, both for Happy New Year (1980). Additional credits include costumes for Katharine Hepburn in the stage production of The Millionairess (1952) and Josephine Baker's 1964 revue. He also provided personal and performance wardrobes for the singers and style icons Dalida and Hildegard Knef.

=== Film ===
- Madame et ses peaux-rouges (The Lady and Her Redskins), for Arletty 1948
- Monseigneur, for Nadia Gray 1949
- Amour et compagnie (Love and Companionship), for Gaby Sylvia 1950
- Le Château de verre (The Glass Castle), for Michèle Morgan 1950
- Night Without Stars, for Nadia Gray 1951
- Identité judiciaire (Paris Vice Squad), for Odette Barencey 1951
- Les miracles n'ont lieu qu'une fois (Miracles Only Happen Once), for Alida Valli 1951
- L'étrange Madame X (The Strange Madame X), for Michèle Morgan 1951
- Ombre et lumière (Shadow and Light), for Simone Signoret 1951
- Dupont Barbès (Sins of Madeleine), for Madeleine Lebeau 1951
- Le cap de l'espérance, for Edwige Feuillère 1951
- Ma femme est formidable (My Wife Is Formidable), for Sophie Desmarets 1951
- No Highway in the Sky, for Marlene Dietrich 1951
- La Vérité sur Bébé Donge (The Truth About Bebe Donge), for Danielle Darrieux 1952
- Les Sept Péchés capitaux (The Seven Deadly Sins), for Michèle Morgan 1952
- Adorables créatures (Adorable Creatures), for Edwige Feuillère 1952
- Le Fruit défendu (Forbidden Fruit), for Françoise Arnoul 1952
- Le témoin de minuit (Midnight Witness), for Catherine Erard 1953
- Alerte au sud (Alarm in Morocco), for Gianna Maria Canale 1953
- Le Grand jeu, for Gina Lollobrigida 1953
- L'amour d'une femme (The Love of a Woman), for Micheline Presle 1953
- Destinées (Daughters of Destiny), for Claudette Colbert 1954
- Quai des blondes (Quay of Blondes), for Barbara Laage & Madeleine Lebeau 1954
- Le grand pavois (The Big Flag), for Marie Mansart 1954
- Knave of Hearts, for Valerie Hobson & Joan Greenwood 1954
- Bonnes à tuer (One Step to Eternity), for Danielle Darrieux 1954
- Les fruits de l'été (Fruits of Summer), for Etchika Choureau 1955
- The Deep Blue Sea, for Vivien Leigh 1955
- Les Carnets du Major Thompson (The French, They Are a Funny Race), for Martine Carol 1955
- Betrayed, for Lana Turner 1955
- Teufel in Seide (Devil in Silk), for Lilli Palmer 1956
- Et Dieu... créa la femme (...And God Created Woman), for Brigitte Bardot 1956
- Rencontre à Paris (Meeting in Paris), for Betsy Blair 1956
- Foreign Intrigue, for Geneviève Page 1956
- La mariée est trop belle (The Bride Is Much Too Beautiful), for Micheline Presle & Brigitte Bardot 1956
- Bonsoir Paris (Good Evening Paris), for Dany Robin 1956
- Der Gläserne Turm (The Glass Tower) for Lilli Palmer 1956
- Le Septième Commandement (The Seventh Commandment), for Edwige Feuillère 1957
- The Happy Road, for Barbara Laage 1957
- Tempestuous Love (Wie ein Sturmwind), for Lilli Palmer 1957
- Sénéchal le magnifique (Sénéchal the Magnificent), for Nadia Gray 1957
- Fire Down Below, for Rita Hayworth 1957
- Sait-on jamais… (No Sun in Venice), for Françoise Arnoul 1957
- The Parisian, for Brigitte Bardot 1957
- La Seine a rencontré Paris (The Seine Meets Paris), for Models 1957
- The Reluctant Debutante, for Kay Kendall 1958
- Paris Holiday, for Anita Ekberg 1958
- En cas de malheur (In Case of Adversity), for Edwige Feuillère & Brigitte Bardot 1958
- Cette nuit là… (That Night), for Mylène Demongeot 1958
- Toi, le venin (Blonde in a White Car), for Marina Vlady 1959
- Expresso Bongo, for Yolande Donlan 1959
- Le Vent se Lève (Time Bomb), for Mylène Demongeot 1959
- Du rififi chez les femmes (The Riff Raff Girls), for Nadja Tiller 1959
- The Millionairess, for Sophia Loren 1960
- Le baron de l'écluse (The Baron of the Locks), for Micheline Presle 1960
- Mr. Topaze, for Nadia Gray 1961
- Frau Cheyney's Ende (The Last of Mrs. Cheyney), for Lilli Palmer 1961
- The Happy Thieves, for Rita Hayworth 1961
- The Roman Spring of Mrs. Stone, for Vivien Leigh 1961
- Tender Is the Night, for Jennifer Jones & Joan Fontaine 1962
- Adorable Julia, for Lilli Palmer 1962
- Le rendez-vous de minuit, for Lilli Palmer 1962
- La denonciation (aka The Immoral Moment), for Nicole Berger 1962
- Two Weeks in Another Town, for Cyd Charisse 1962
- The Chocolate Tree, for Carroll Baker 1963
- Station Six-Sahara, for Carroll Baker 1963
- Summer Holiday, for Paris Scenes 1963
- The Paradise Suite, for Carroll Baker 1963
- Come Fly with Me, for Dawn Addams 1963
- In the Cool of the Day, for Constance Cummings & Jane Fonda 1963
- Laissez tirer les tireurs, for Daphné Dayle 1964
- Joy House, for Jane Fonda 1964
- Här börjar äventyret, for Harriet Andersson 1965
- Mona, l'étoile sans nom (The Nameless Star), for Marina Vlady 1966
- Um 8 fängt unser Leben an, for Hildegard Knef 1966
- Drop Dead Darling (aka Arrivederci, Baby!), for Rosanna Schiaffino 1966
- Topaz, for Dany Robin & Karin Dor 1969
- Hard Contract, for Lee Remick 1969
- La Maison de campagne, for Danielle Darrieux 1969
- Love Is a Funny Thing, for Annie Girardot 1969
- Du blé en liasses, for Arlene Dahl 1969
- Unter den Dächern von St. Pauli (Under the Roofs of St. Pauli), for Jean-Claude Pascal 1970
- Children of Mata Hari, for Lilli Palmer 1970
- Tam Lin, for Ava Gardner 1970
- Sapho ou La fureur d'aimer, for Marina Vlady 1971
- L'homme qui vient de la nuit, for Noëlle Adam 1971
- Absences répétées (Repeated Absences), for Danièle Delorme 1972
- Au théâtre ce soir - "Mademoiselle", for Dominique Blanc 1982

=== Stage ===
- Le Petit Café, for Marie Dubas 1949
- Le Voyage, for Yvonne Printemps 1950
- Fric-Frac, for Jacqueline Porel 1950
- Henry IV, for Margaretta Scott 1950
- Judy Garland at the Palace "Two-A-Day", 1951
- Mort d'un rat, for Mary Marquet 1951
- Madame Sans-Gêne, for Béatrice Bretty 1951
- The Millionairess, for Katharine Hepburn 1952
- Les Compagnons de la marjolaine, for Melina Mercouri 1952
- La Chanson du mal-aimé, for Léo Ferré 1954
- Ce diable d'ange, for Viviane Romance & Geneviève Kervine 1955
- Le Séducteur, for Emmanuelle Riva 1956
- The Pleasure of His Company, for Cast 1958
- Rape of the Belt, for Constance Cummings & Joyce Redman 1960
- C'est ça qui m'flanqu'le cafard (Le Placard), for Cast 1963
- Josephine Baker and Her Company, 1964
- La Facture, for Jacqueline Maillan 1968
- Le monde est ce qu'il est, for Cast 1969
- Les Bonshommes, for Yvonne Clech 1970
- Happy New Year, for Cast 1980
- Mademoiselle, for Jacqueline Jehanneuf 1981

== Television appearances and documentaries ==
Balmain was a regular fixture in the media in Europe and in the US, where he appeared on the The Garry Moore Show and The David Frost Show. He was profiled in several television productions and was a main character in the 1970 documentary Gertrude Stein: When This You See, Remember Me. In 2024, he was portrayed by Thomas Poitevin in the streaming series The New Look.

- World in Action: "The Fashion Houses", 1963
- Kleiden, Kleider, Leute? (Do Clothes Make the Man?), 1964
- Chroniques de France, 1964
- Late Night Line-Up, 1964
- Présence du passé: "Les cent jours: L'île d'Elbe", 1965
- Paris aktuell, 1966
- World in Action: "The Professional Dreamers", 1966
- La haute couture: "Aujourd'hui Madame", 1970
- Late Night Line-Up: "Two Faces of Fashion", 1970
- Chroniques de France: "Le mode longue 70-71", 1970
- Gertrude Stein: When This You See, Remember Me, 1970
- Samedi soir, 1971
- Samedi soir, 1973
- Knef '73, 1973
- Passez donc me voir, 1979
- Thé dansant, 1980

== Gallery ==
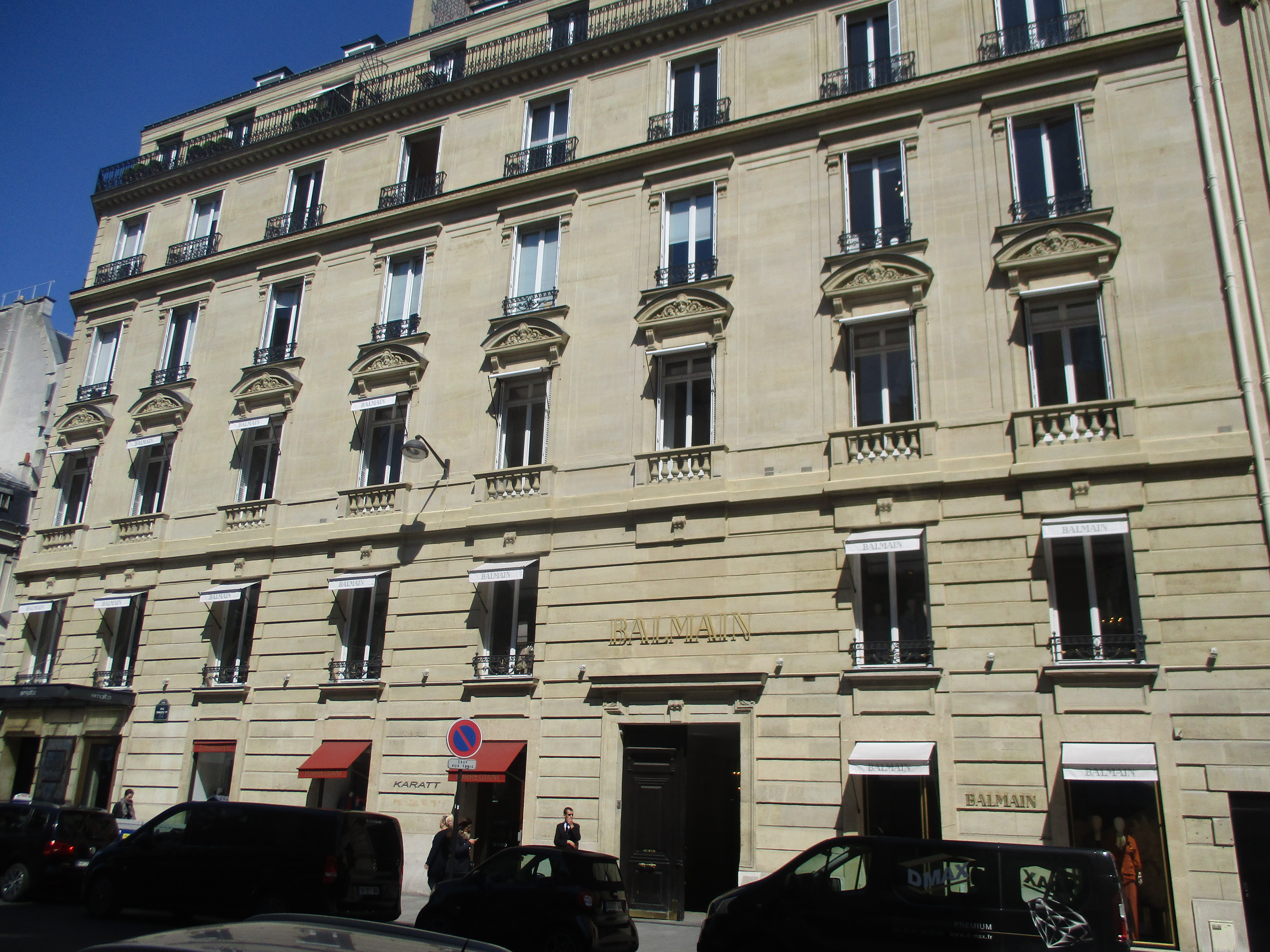
Maison Balmain, 44 rue François-Ier, Paris

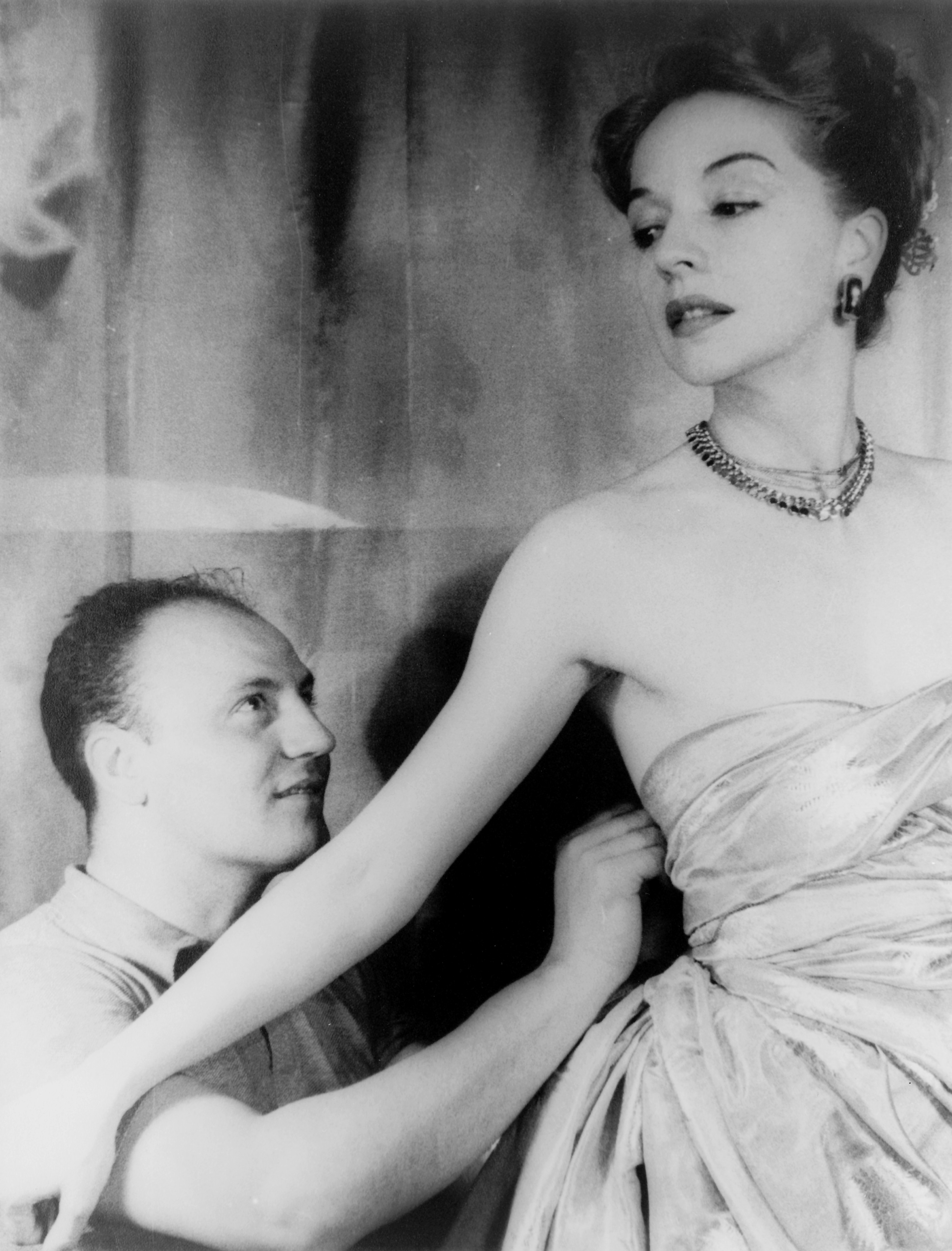
With Ruth Ford, 1947

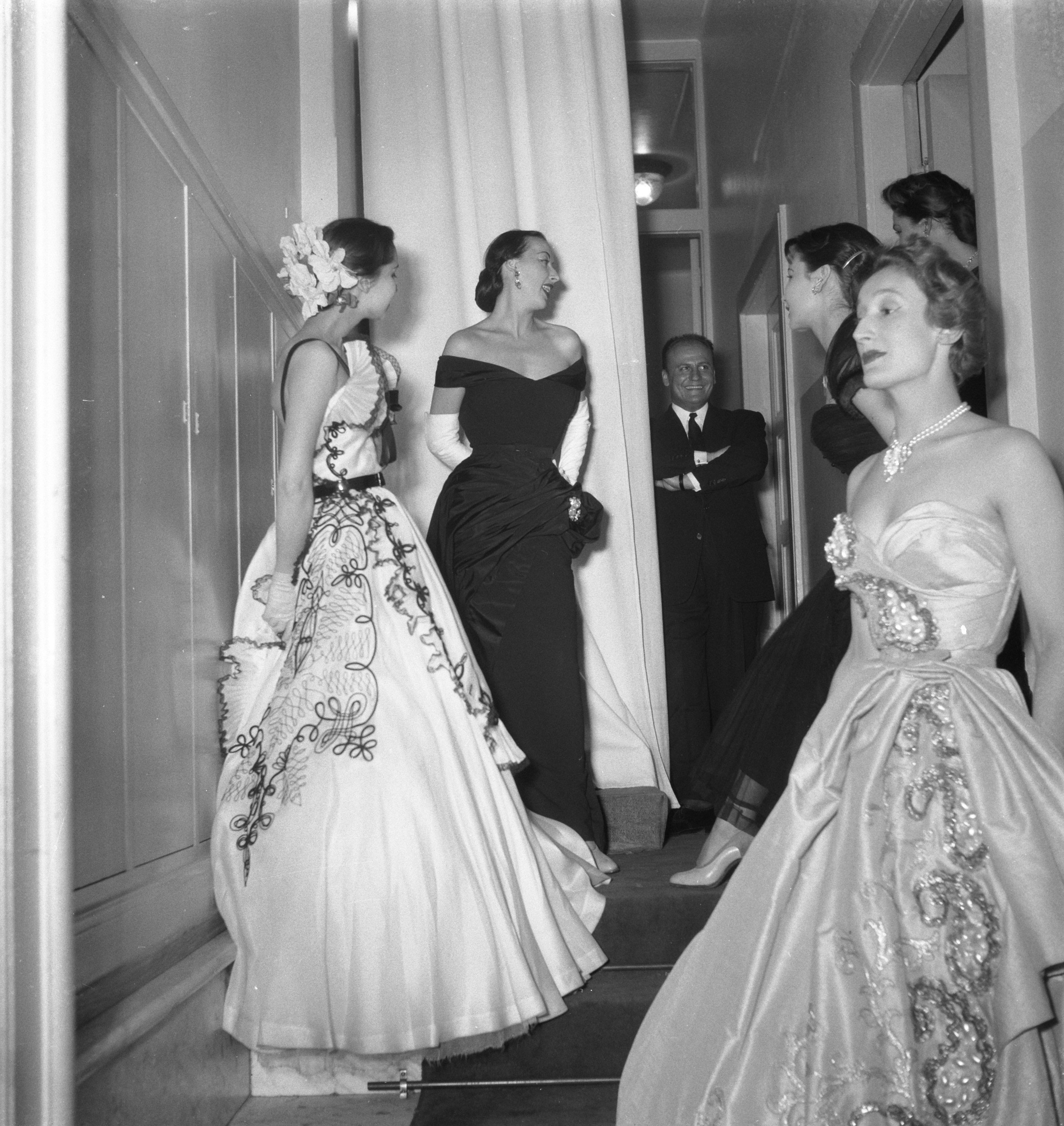
Fashion show, Victoria Hotel, Amsterdam, 1951

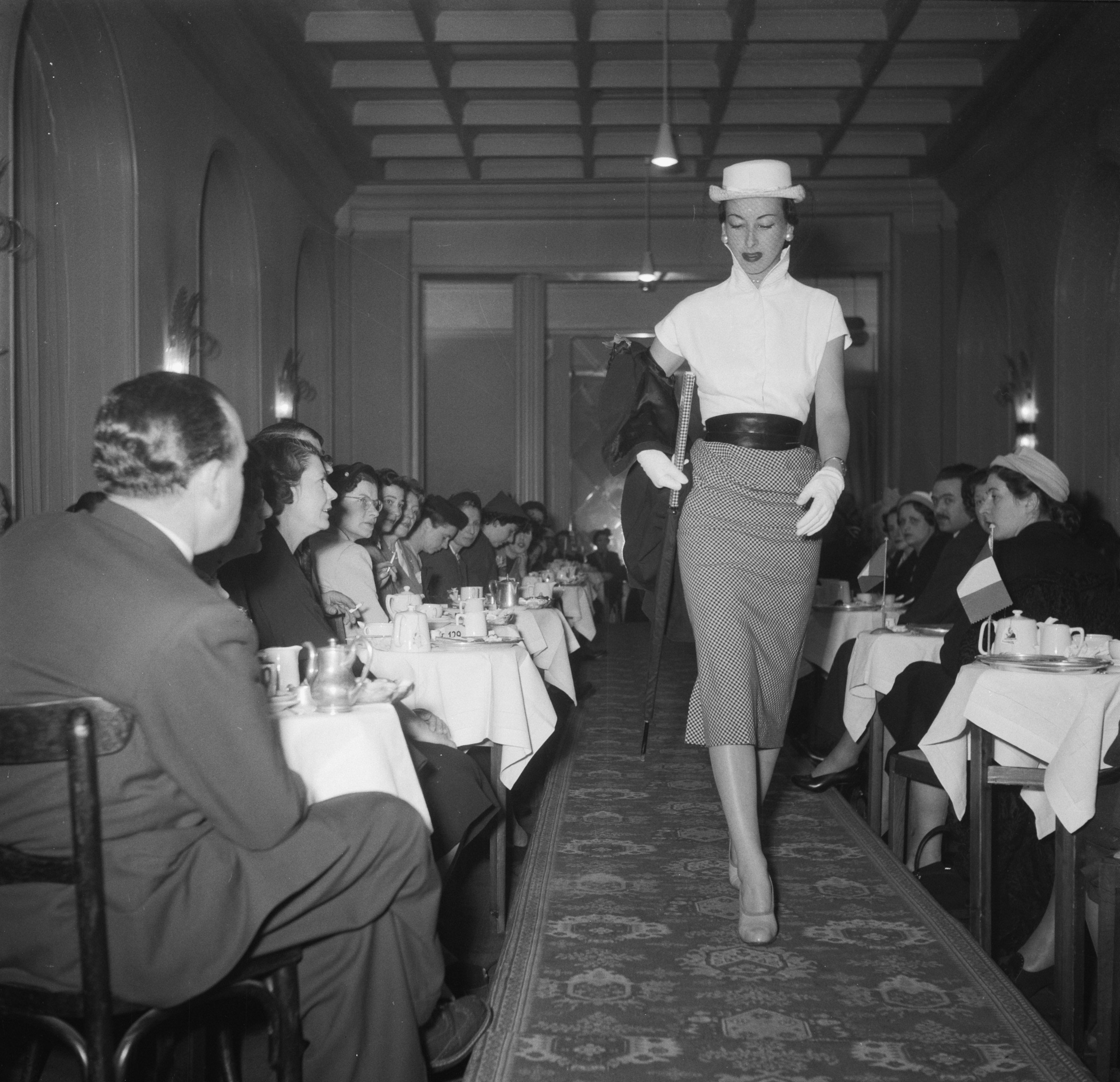
Victoria Hotel Fashion Show

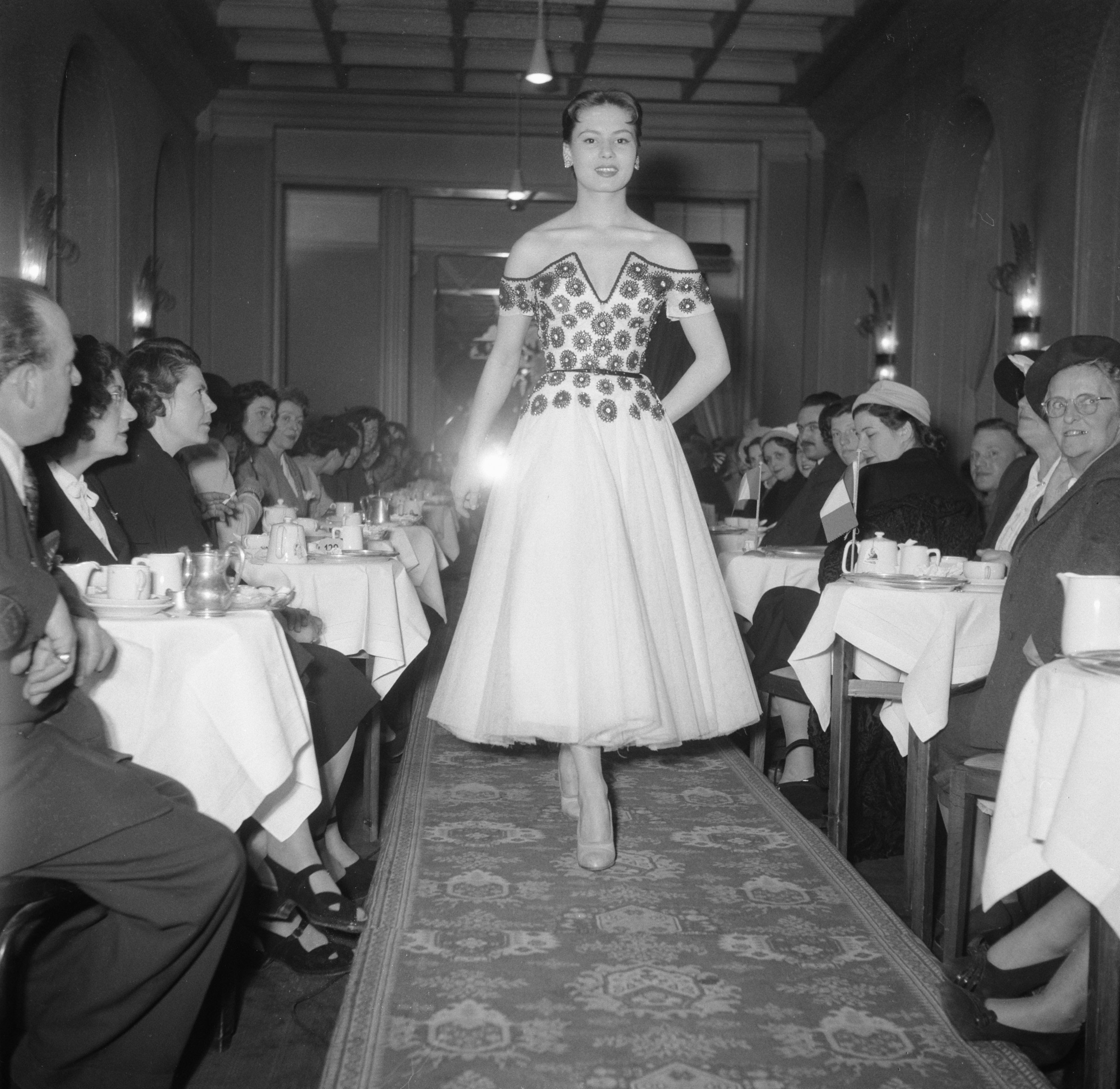
Victoria Hotel Fashion Show

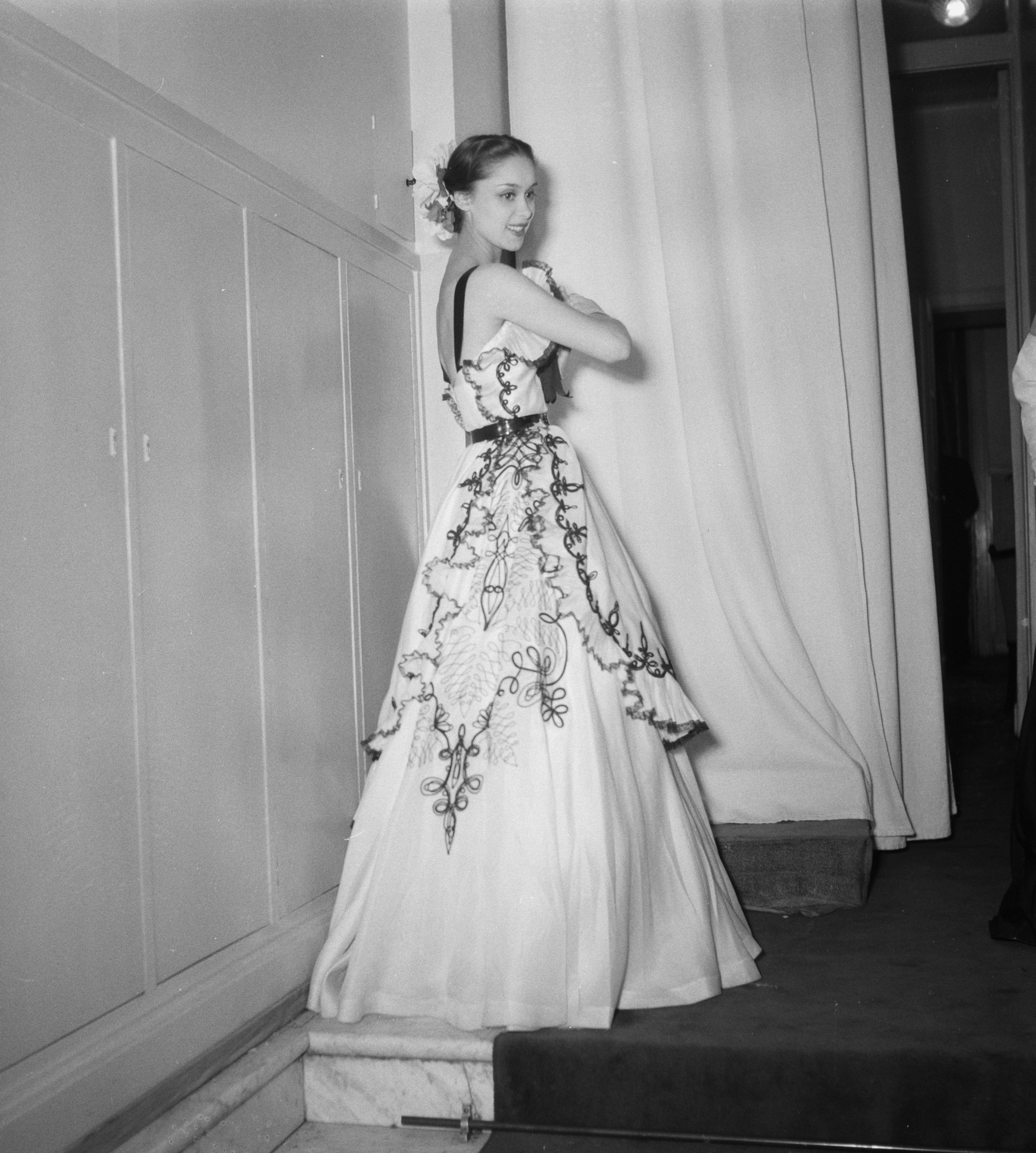
Victoria Hotel Fashion Show

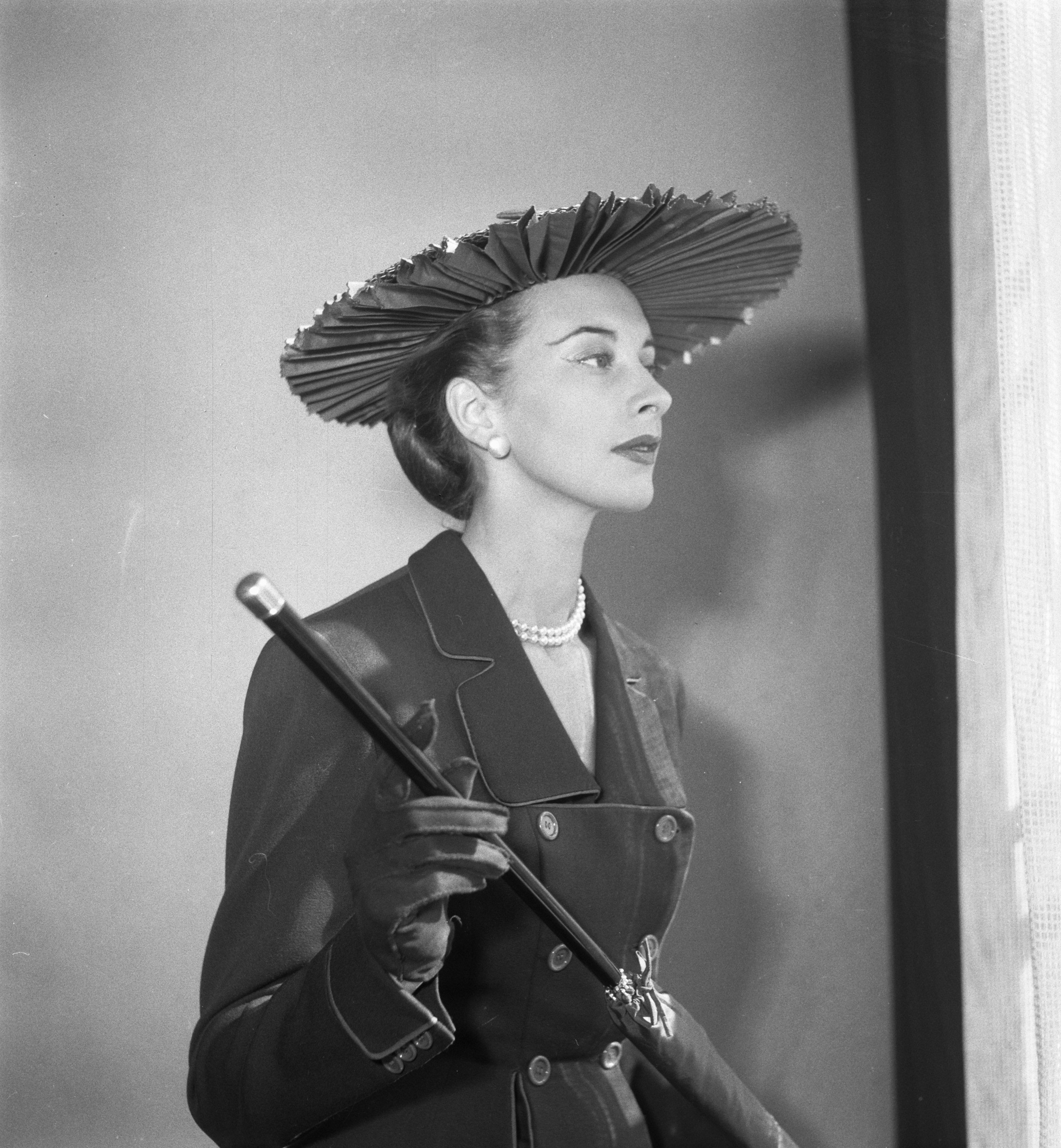
Hat and Coat, 1951

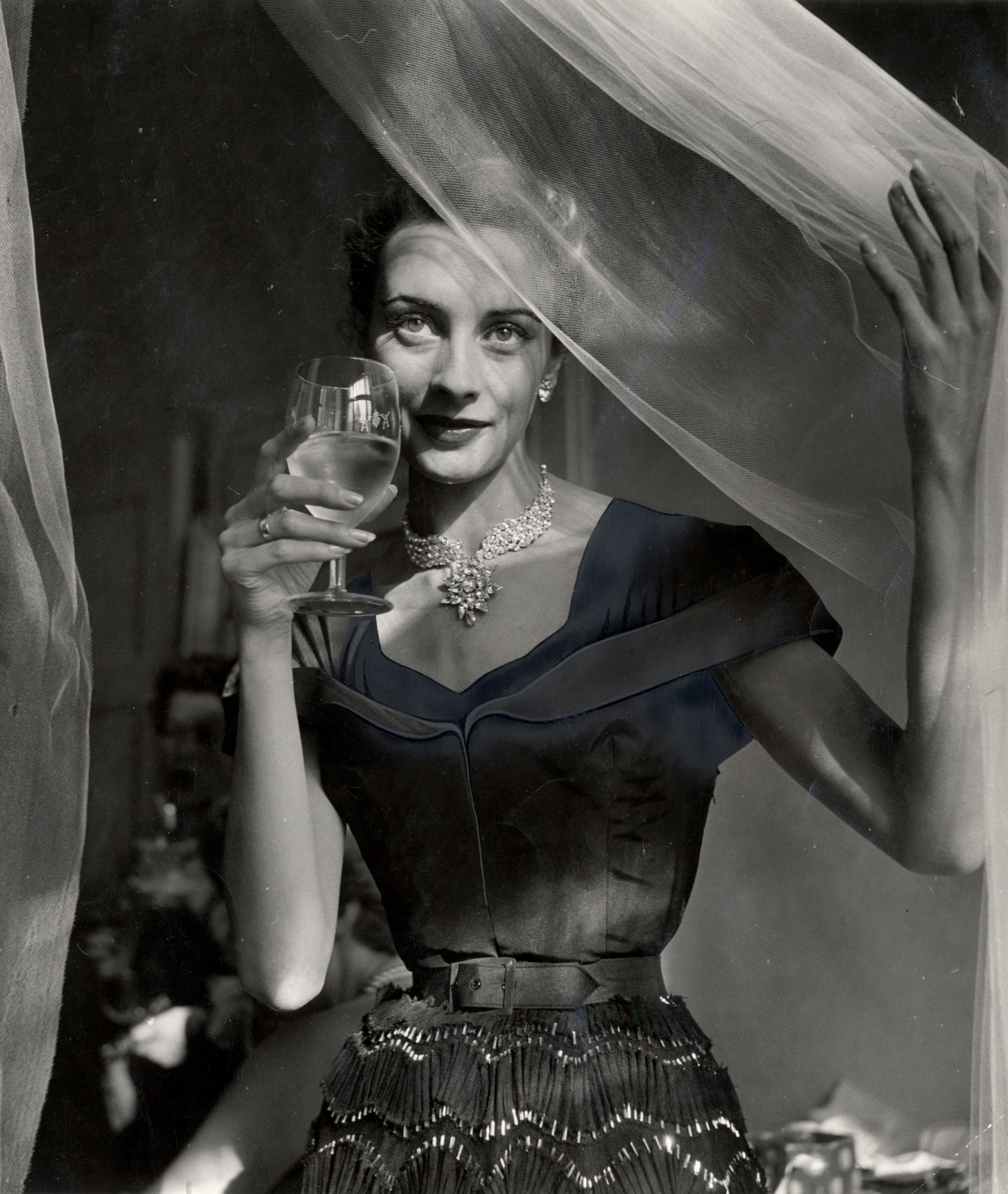
Model Marie-José in a Balmain Cocktail Dress, 1951

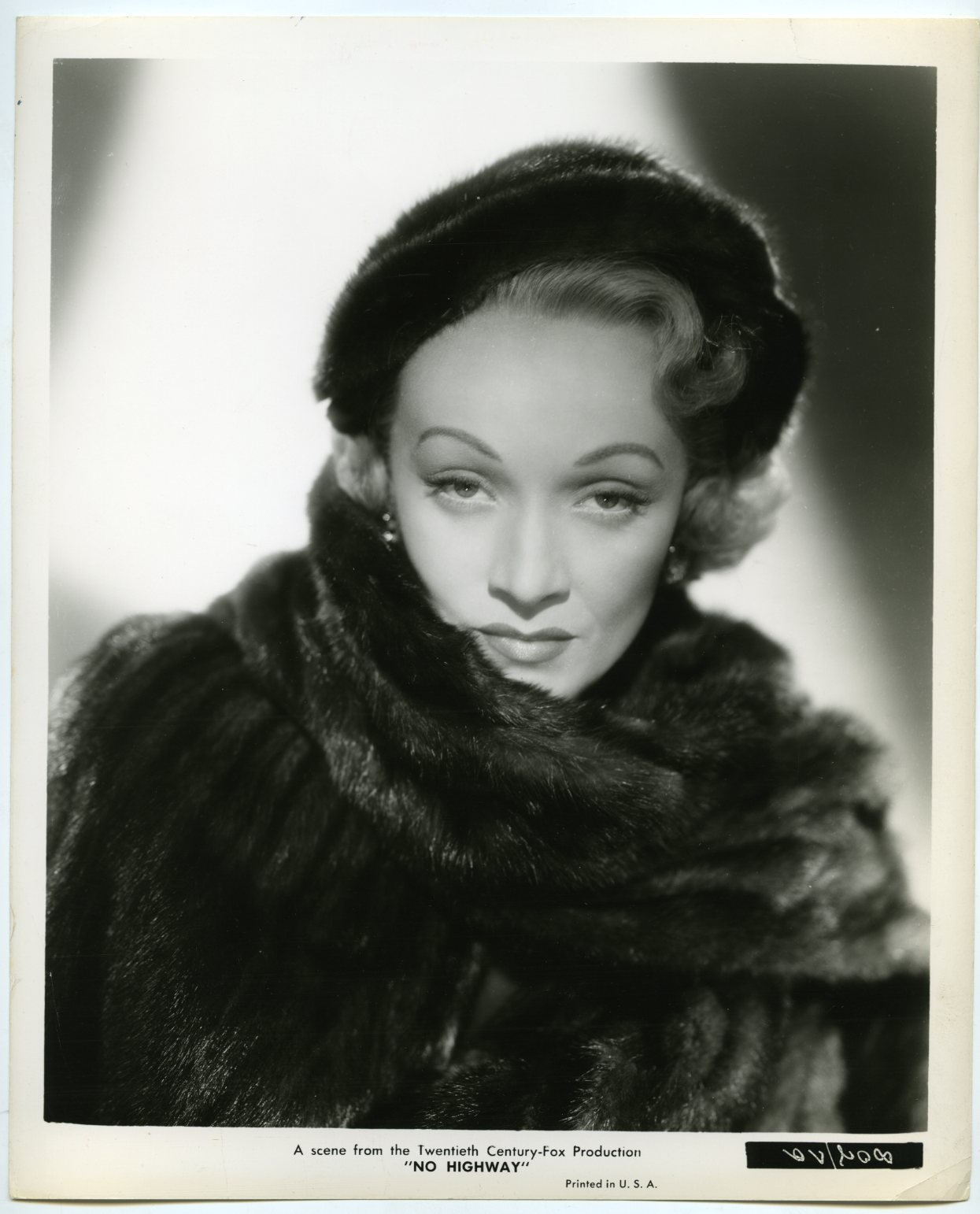
Marlene Dietrich in a Balmain Fur Coat, No Highway in the Sky, 1951

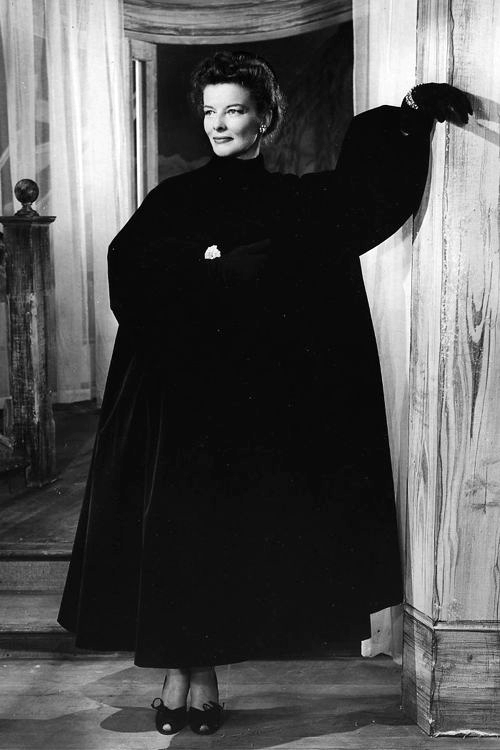
Katharine Hepburn in a Balmain Coat, The Millionairess, 1952

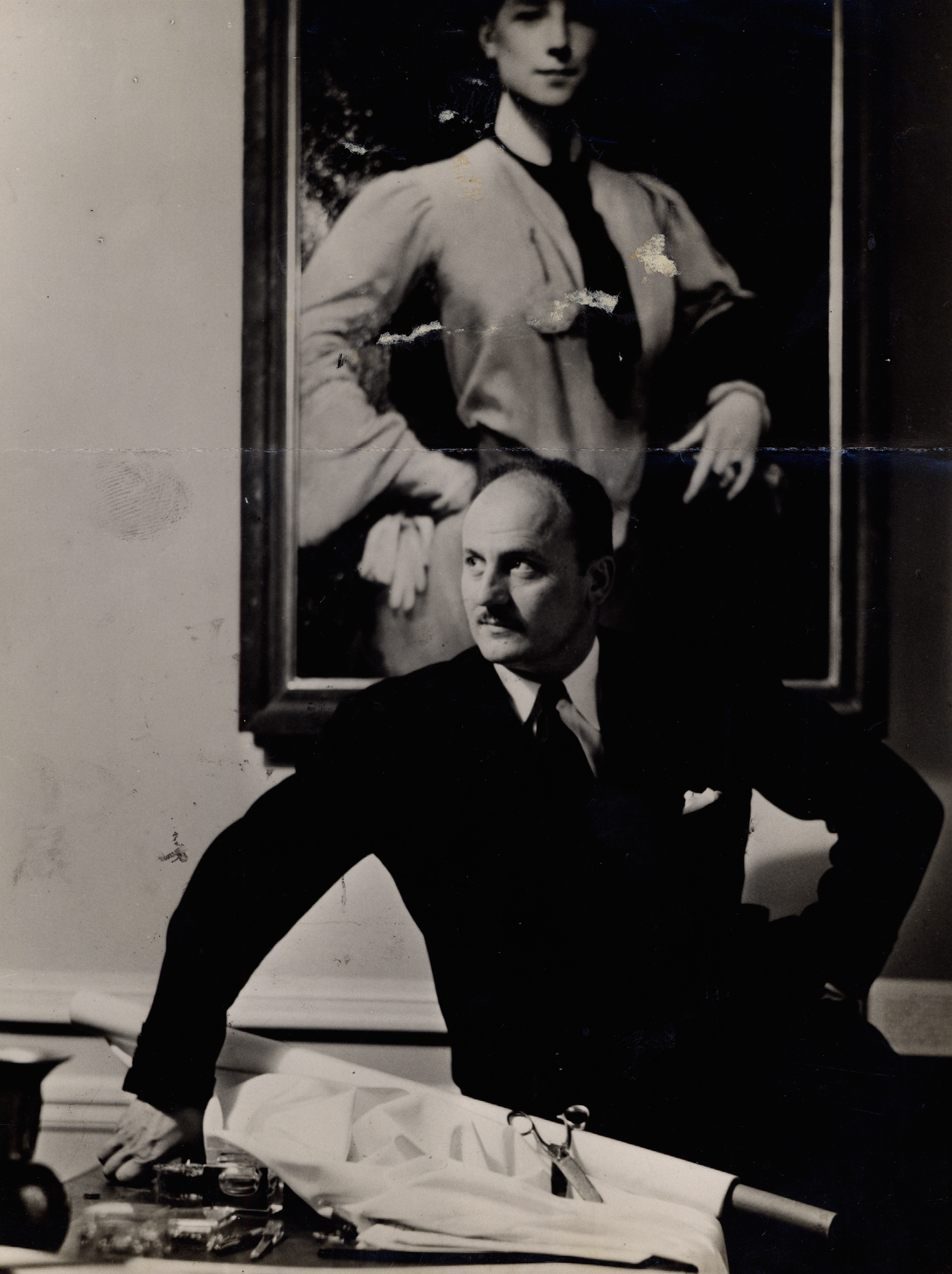
Balmain, 1954

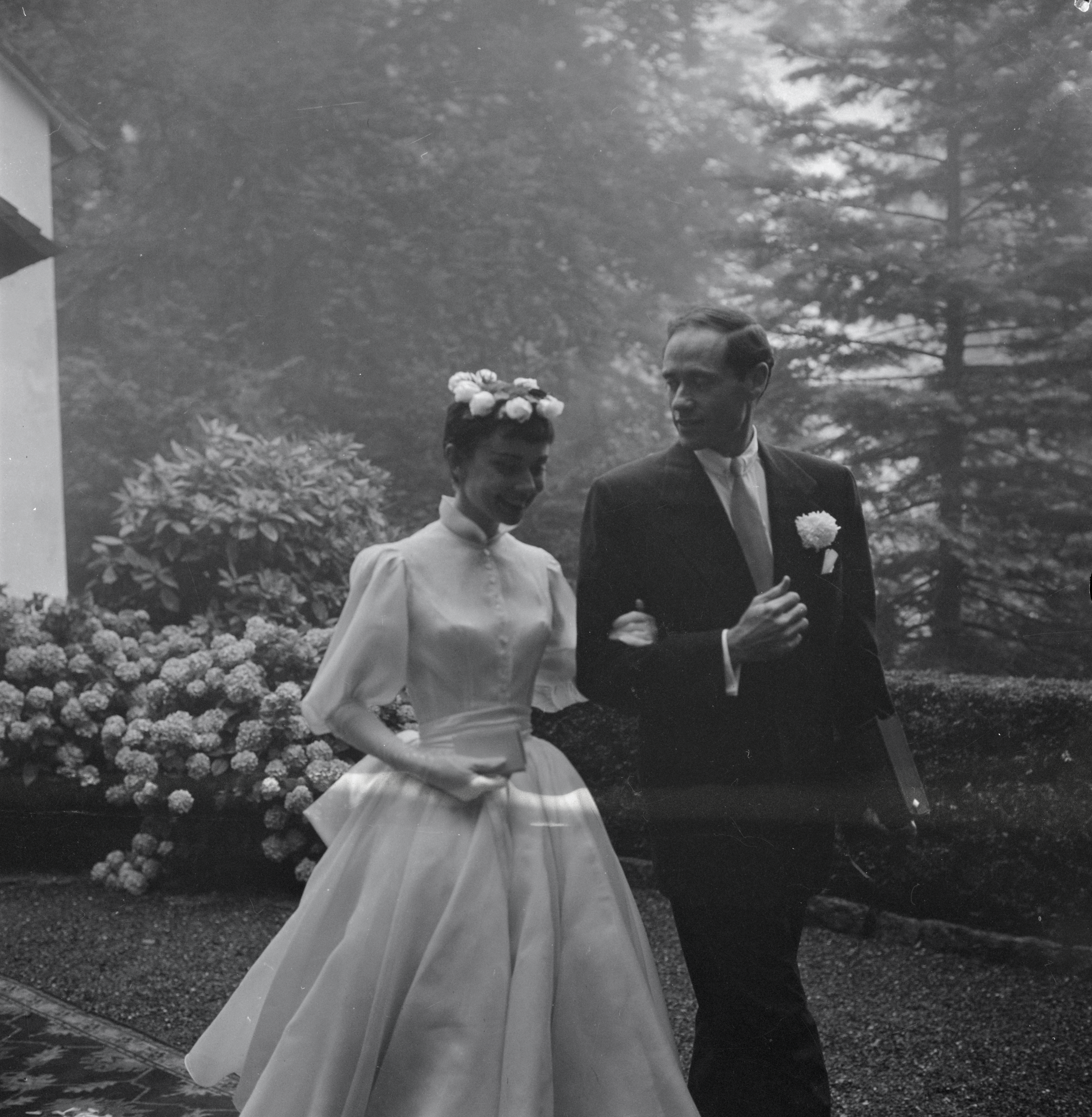
Audrey Hepburn's Wedding Dress, 1954

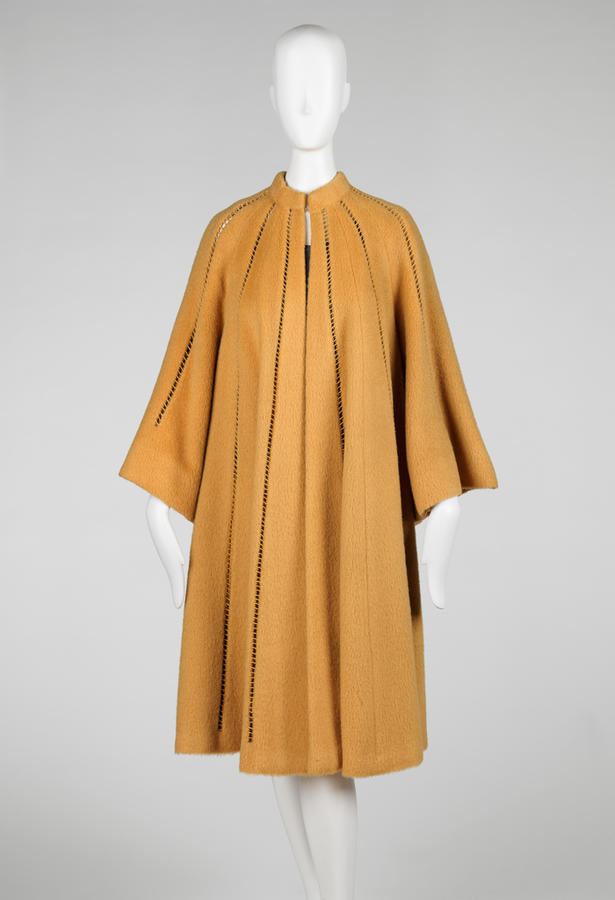
Swing Coat, 1954

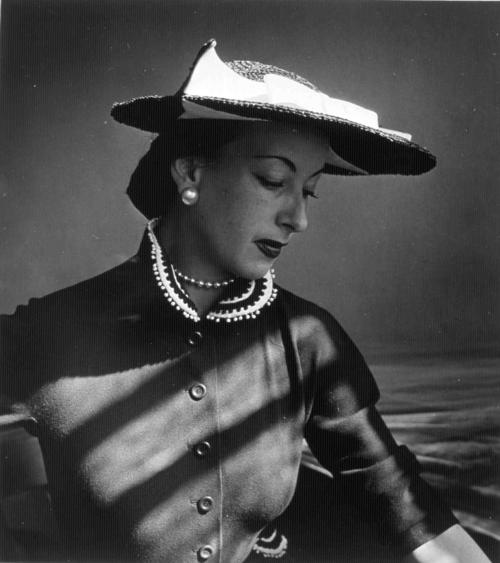
Suit Jacket and Hat, 1955

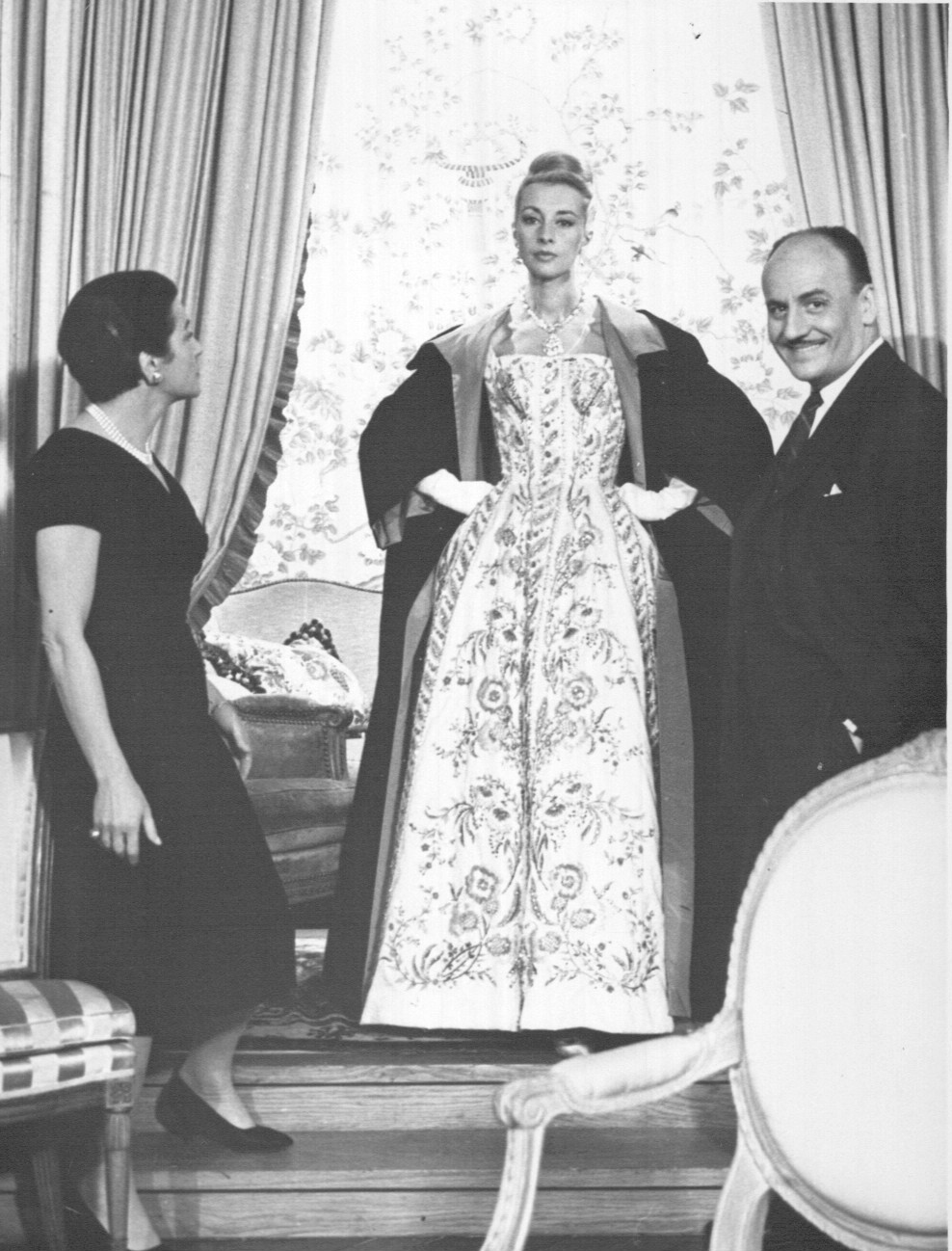
Balmain with Ginette Spanier and Model Marie-Thérèse, 1960

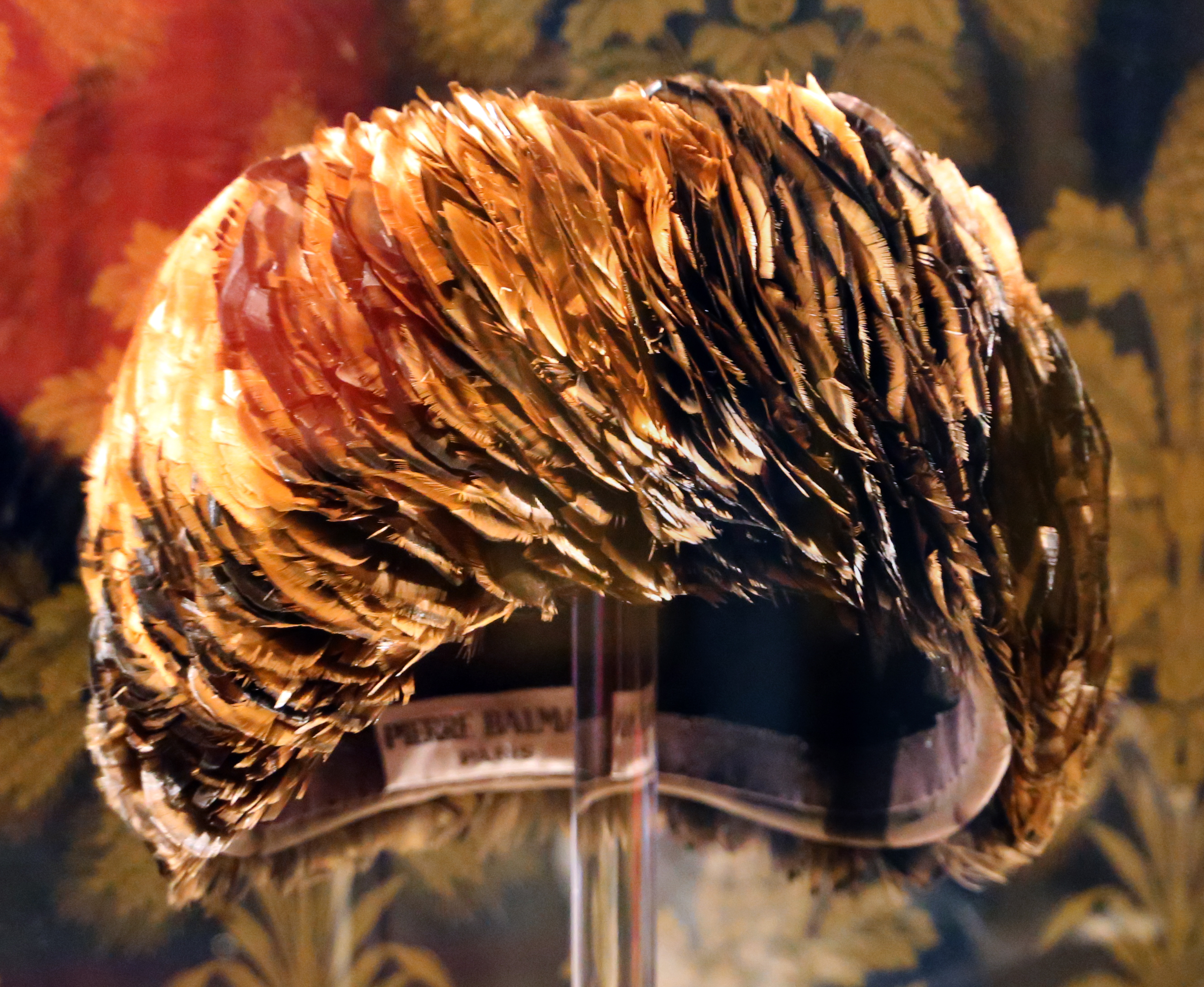
Feathered Hat, 1960

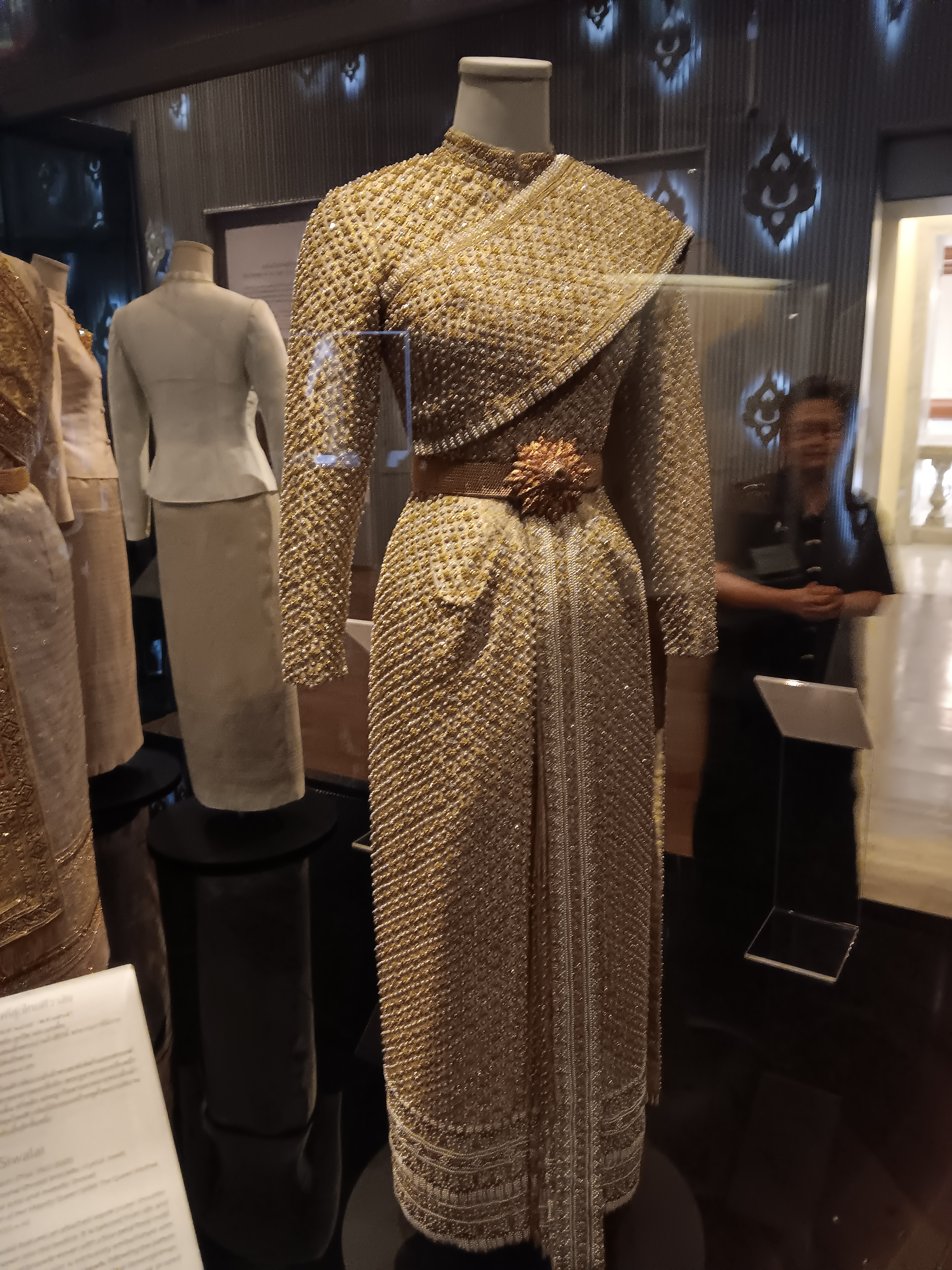
The Queen Sirikit Sivalai Dress, 1960

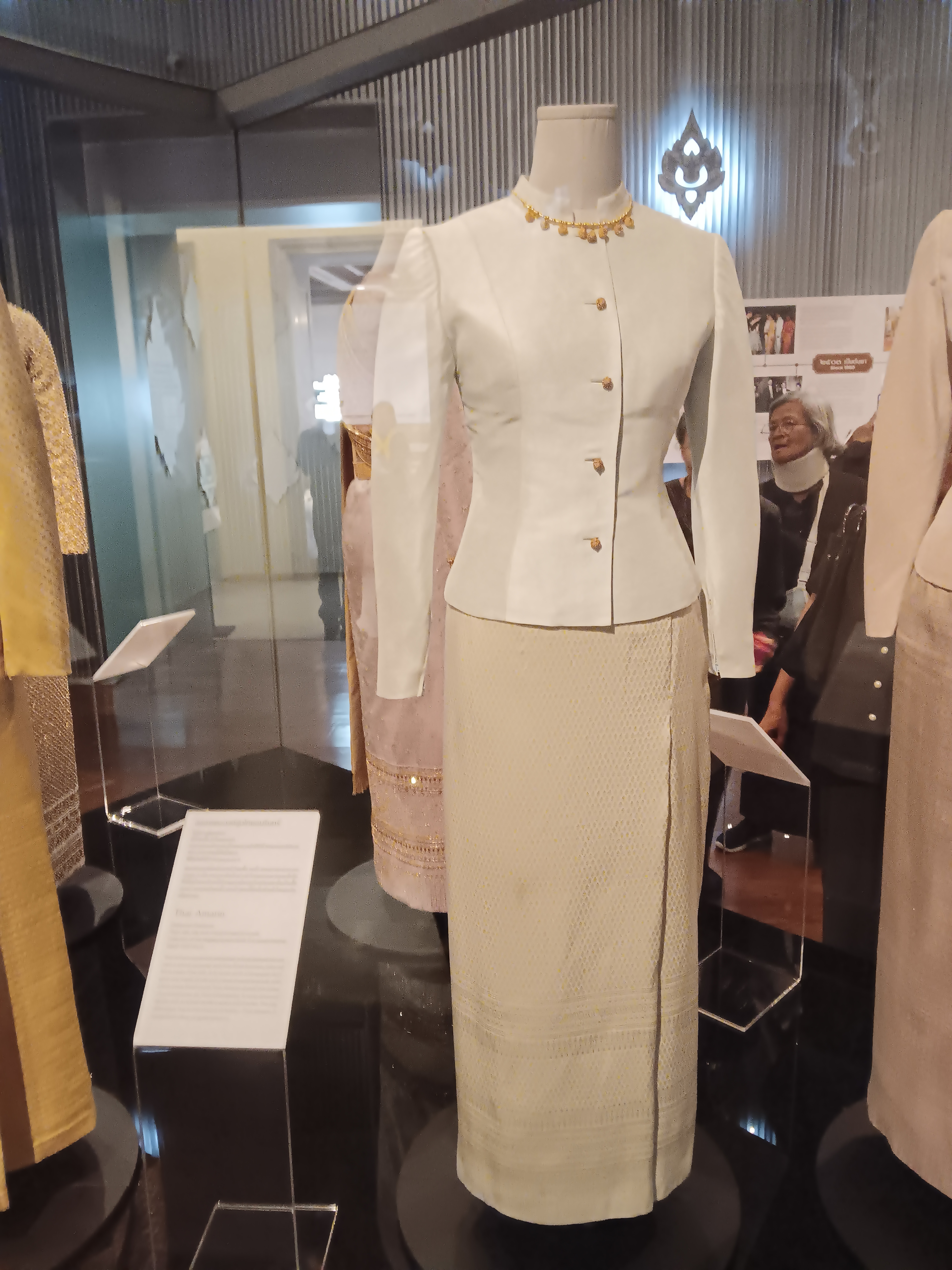
The Queen Sirikit Amarin Dress Suit, 1960

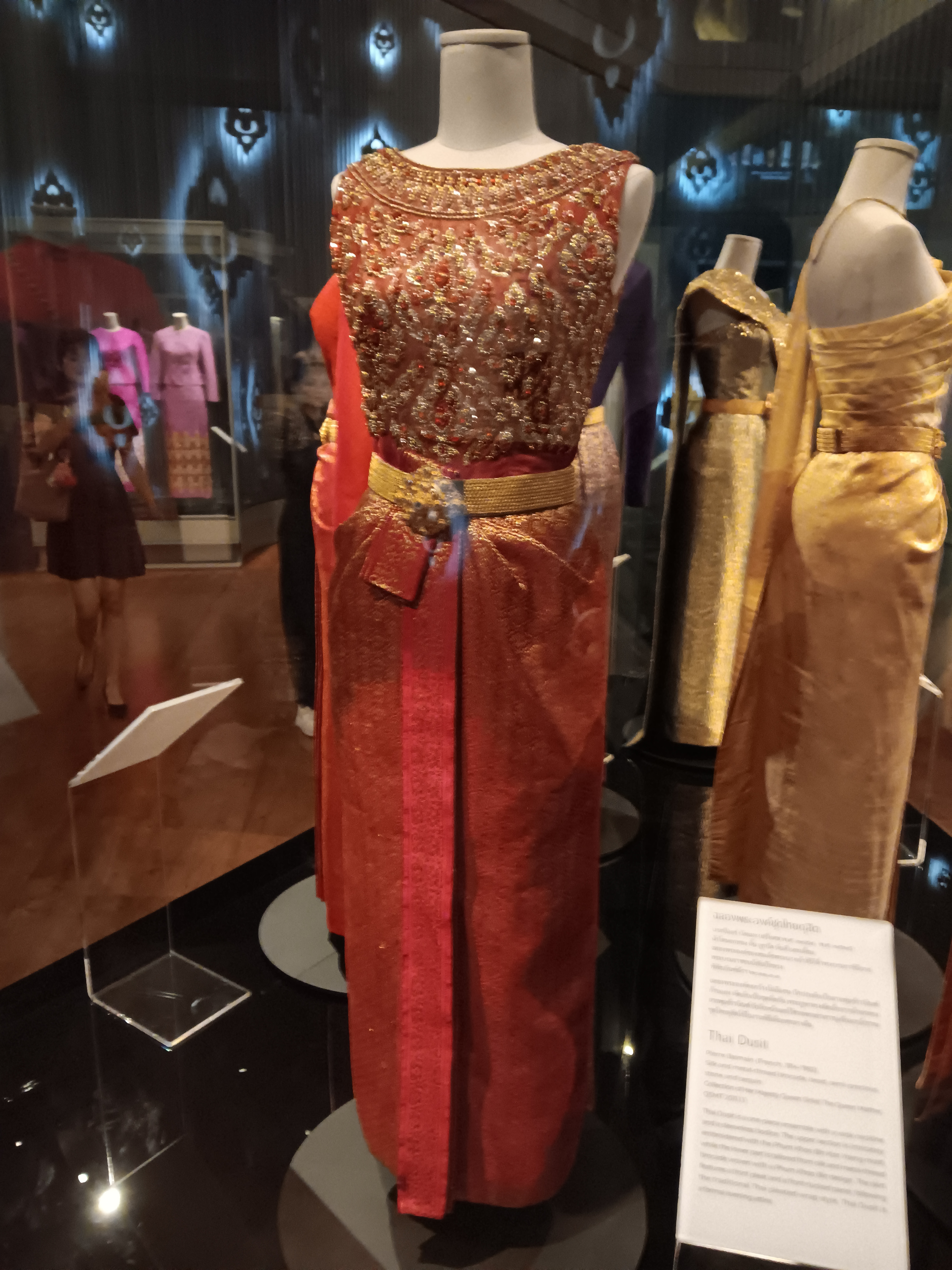
The Queen Sirikit Dusit Gown, 1960

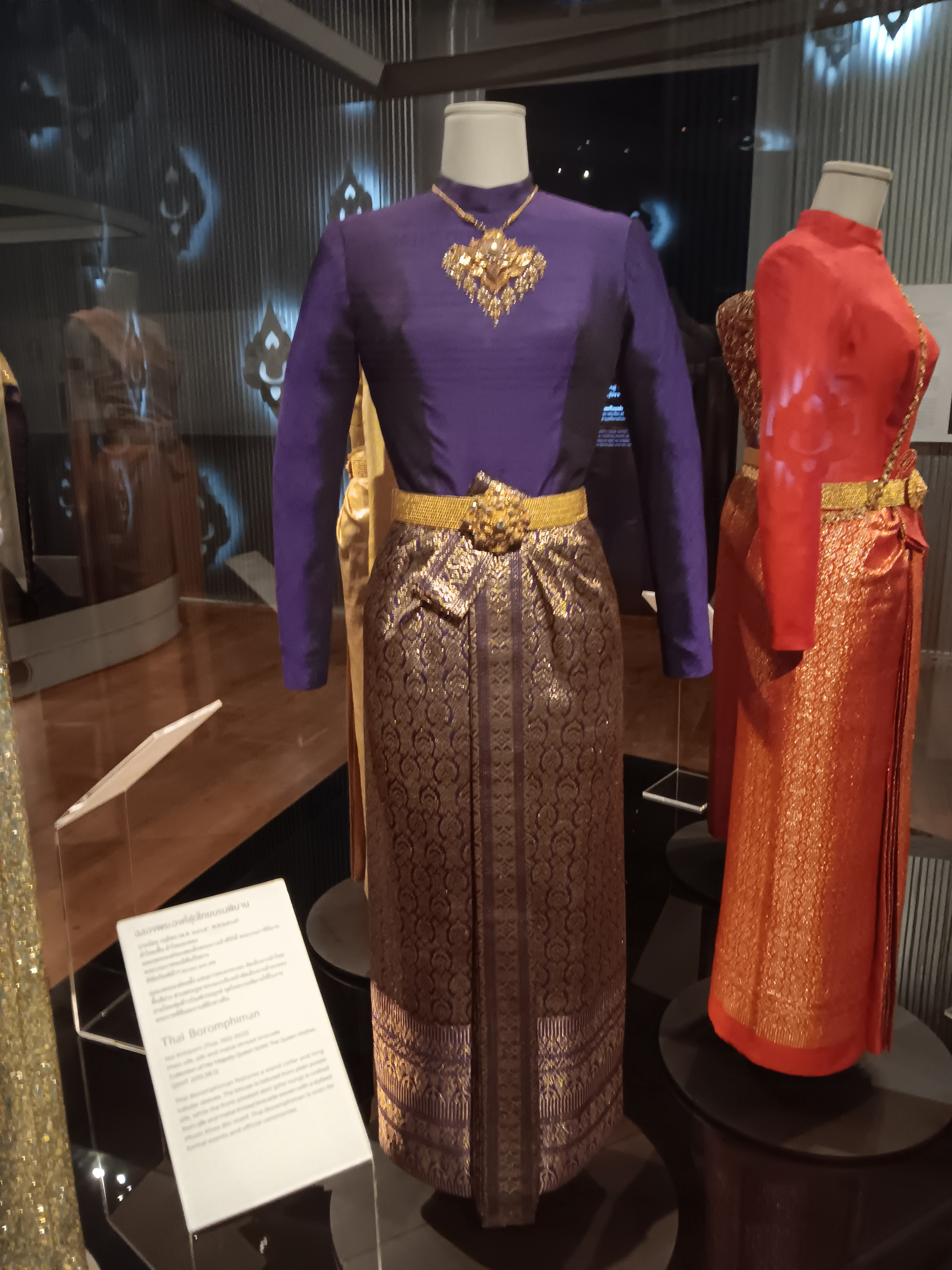
The Queen Sirikit Borompiman Gown, 1960

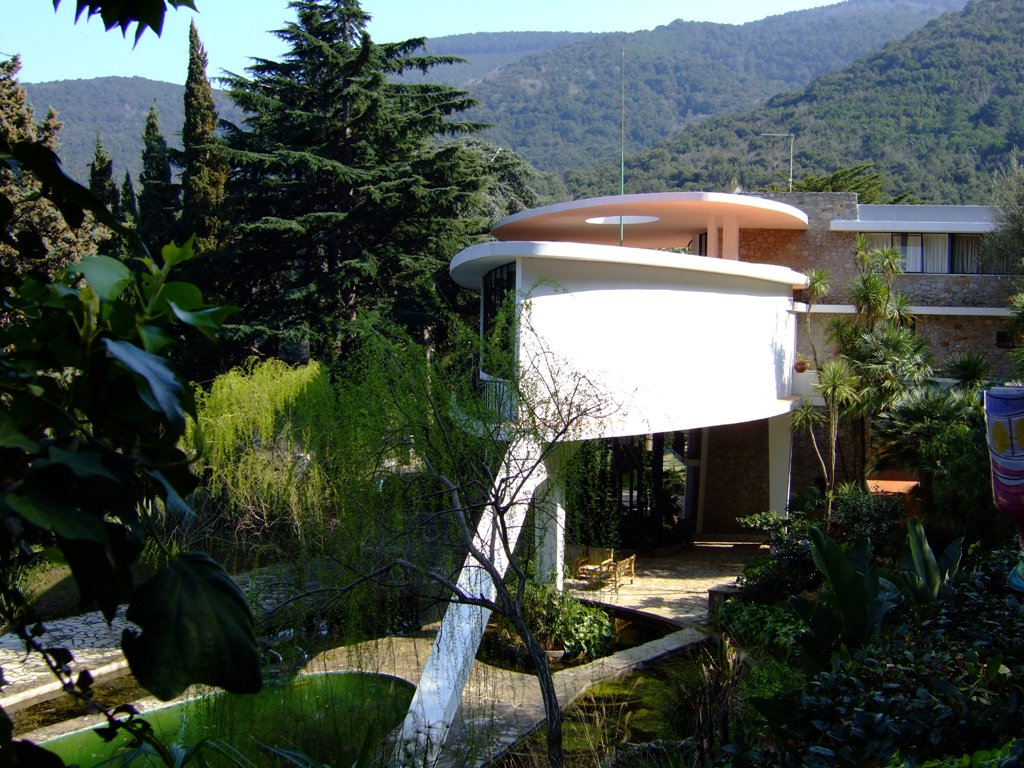
Villa Balmain, Elba, 1960

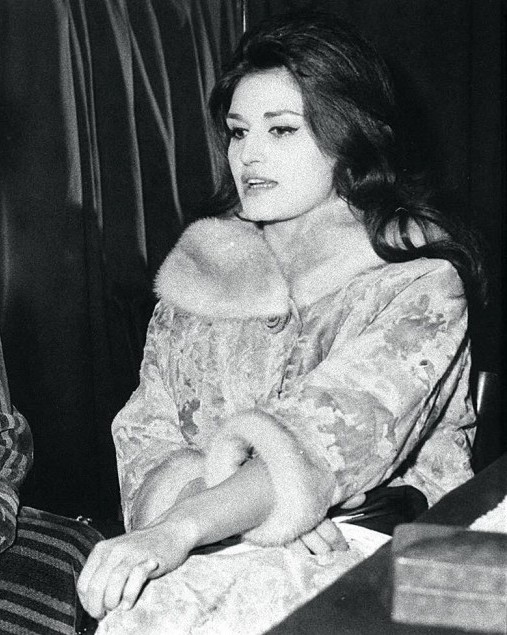
Dalida in a Balmain Coat, 1962

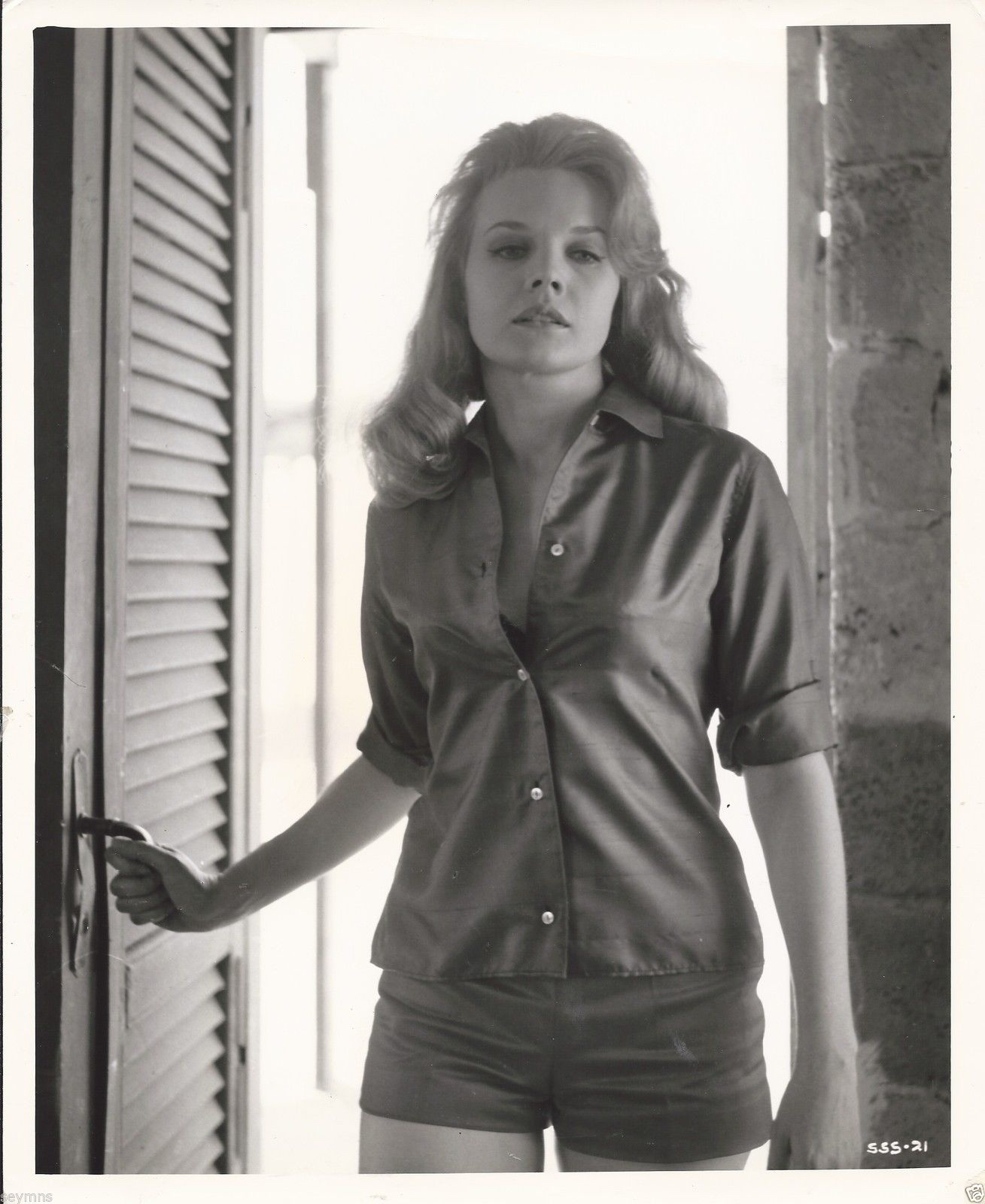
A Shorts Suit for Carroll Baker in Station Six-Sahara, 1963

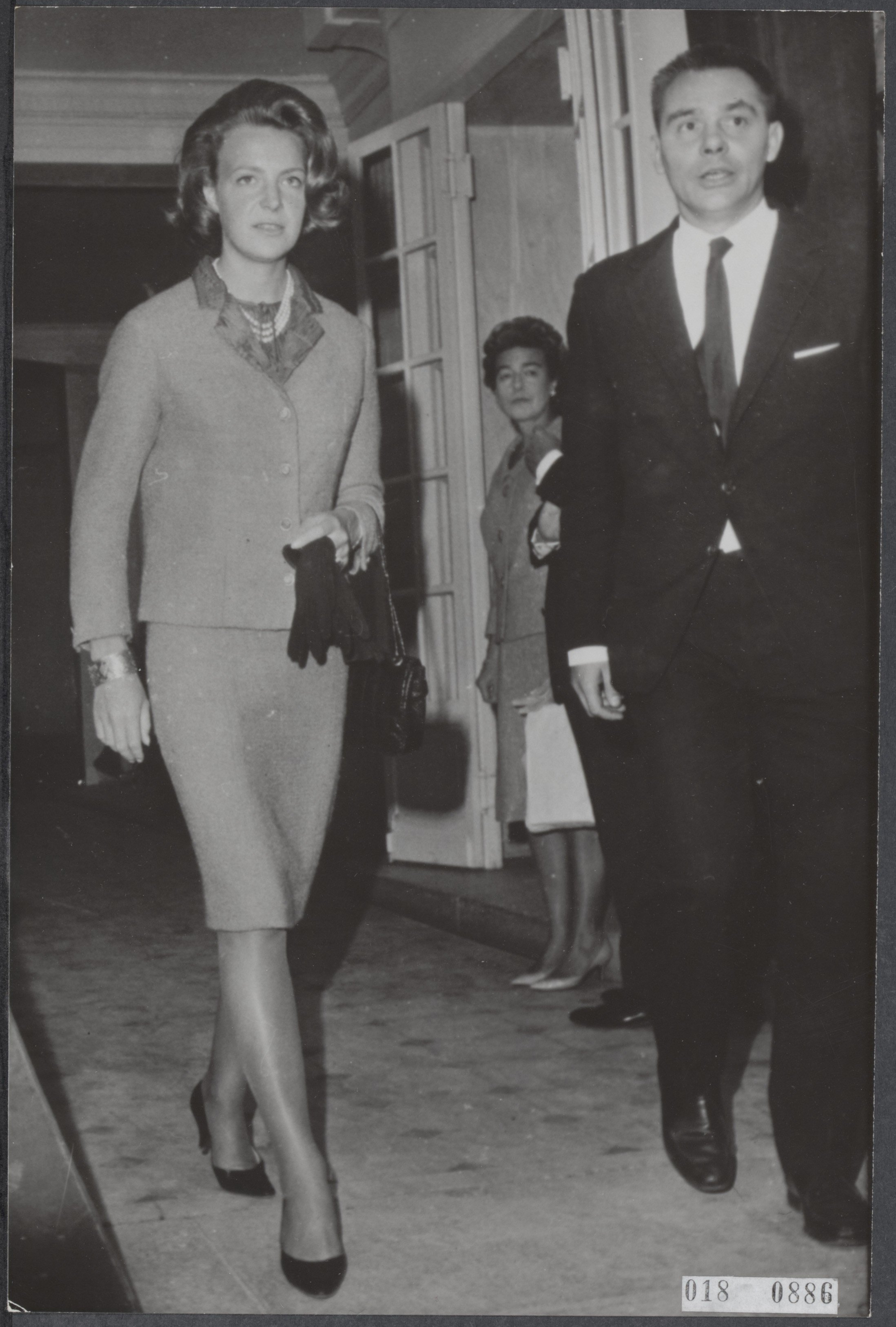
Princess Irene of the Netherlands in a Balmain Suit, 1964

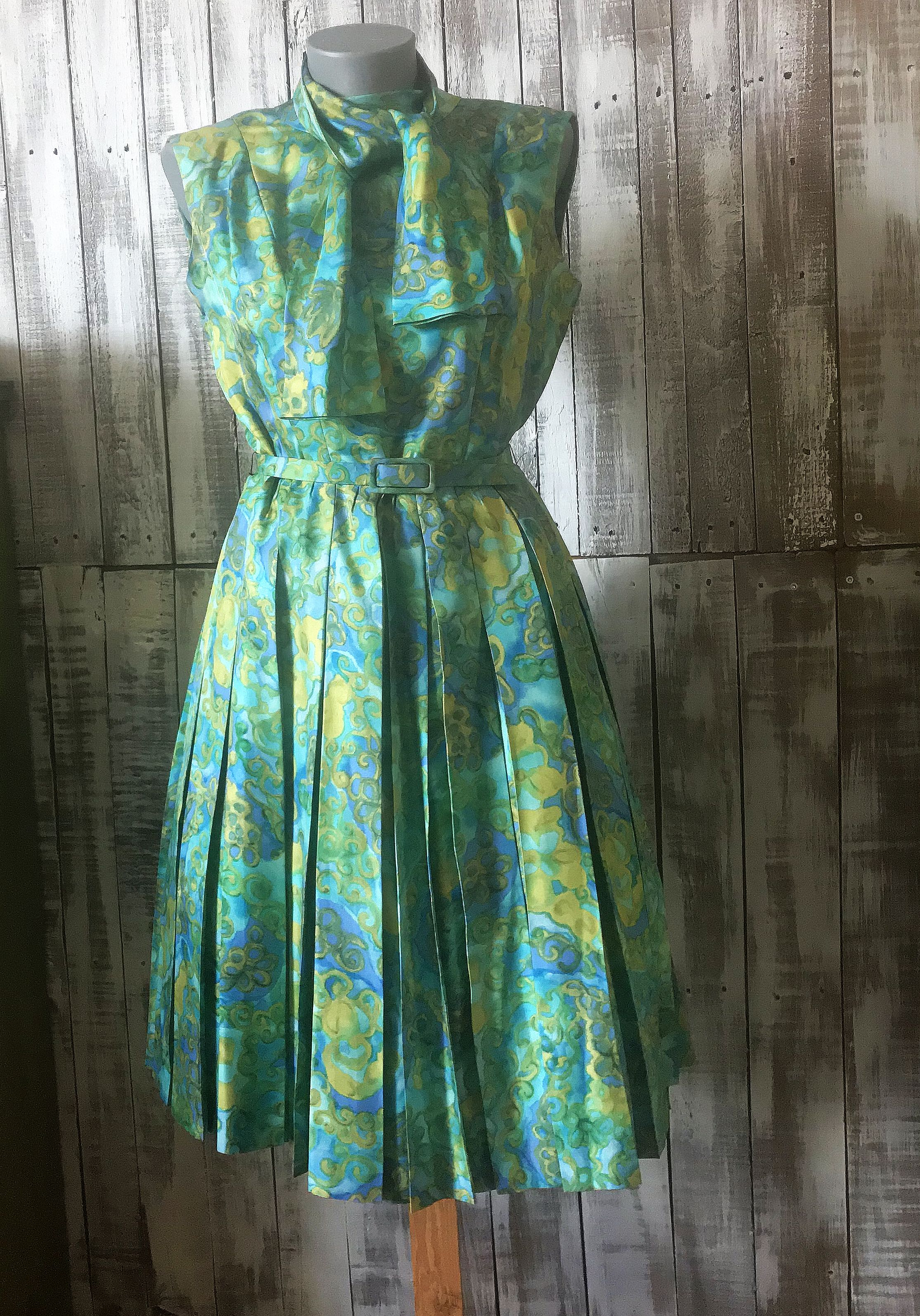
Pleated Cocktail Dress, 1964

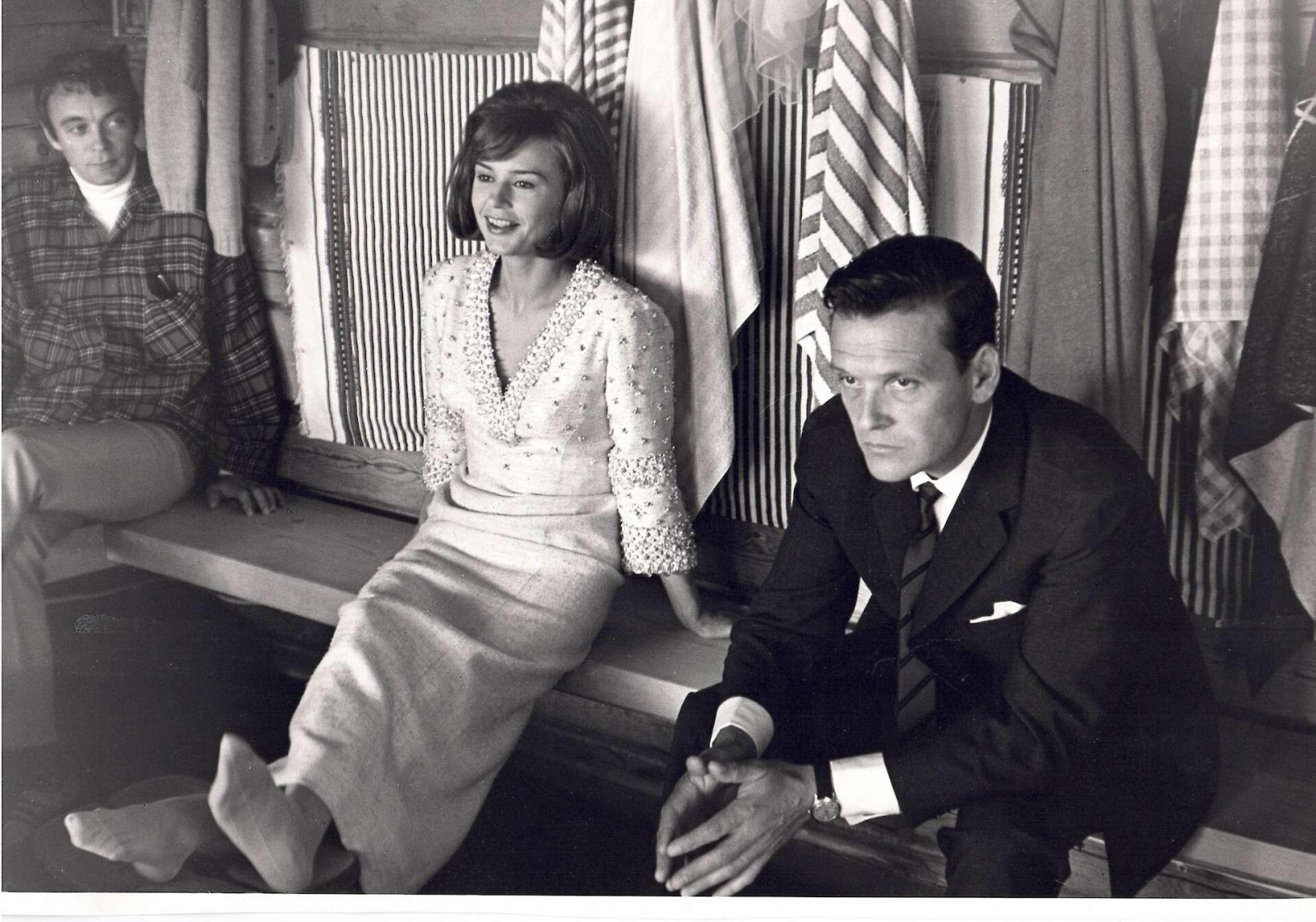
Harriet Andersson in a Gown for Här börjar äventyret, 1965

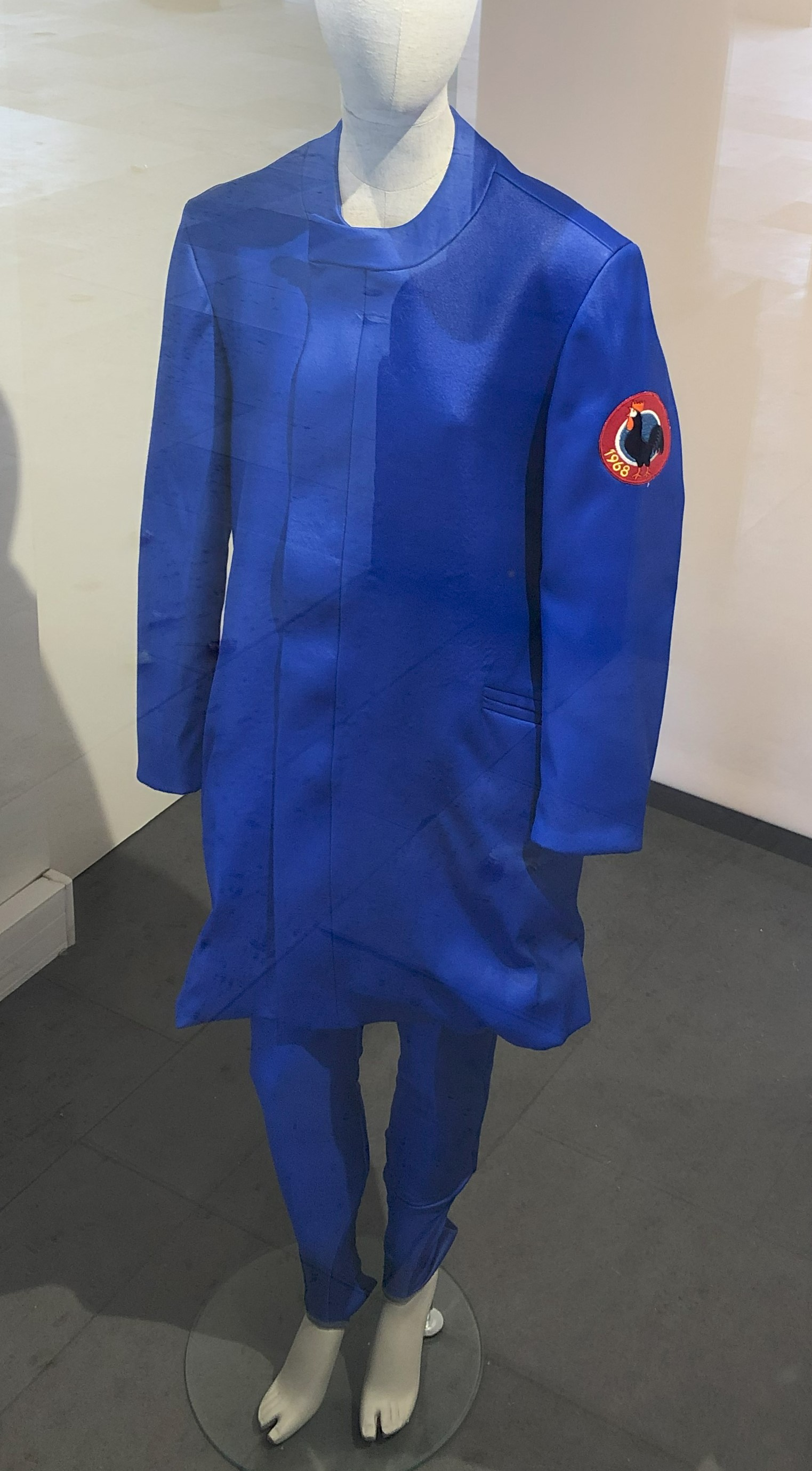
The French Delegation Uniform for the Opening of the 1968 Olympics

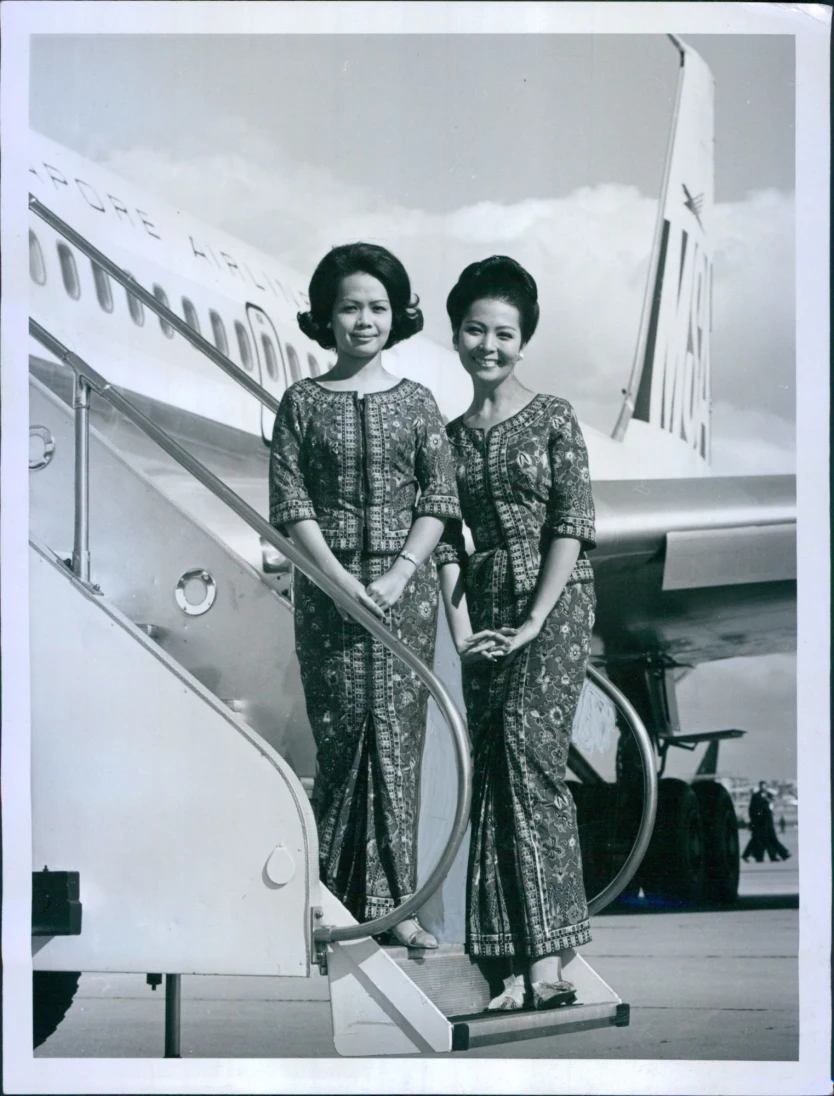
The Malaysia-Singapore Airlines Uniforms, 1968

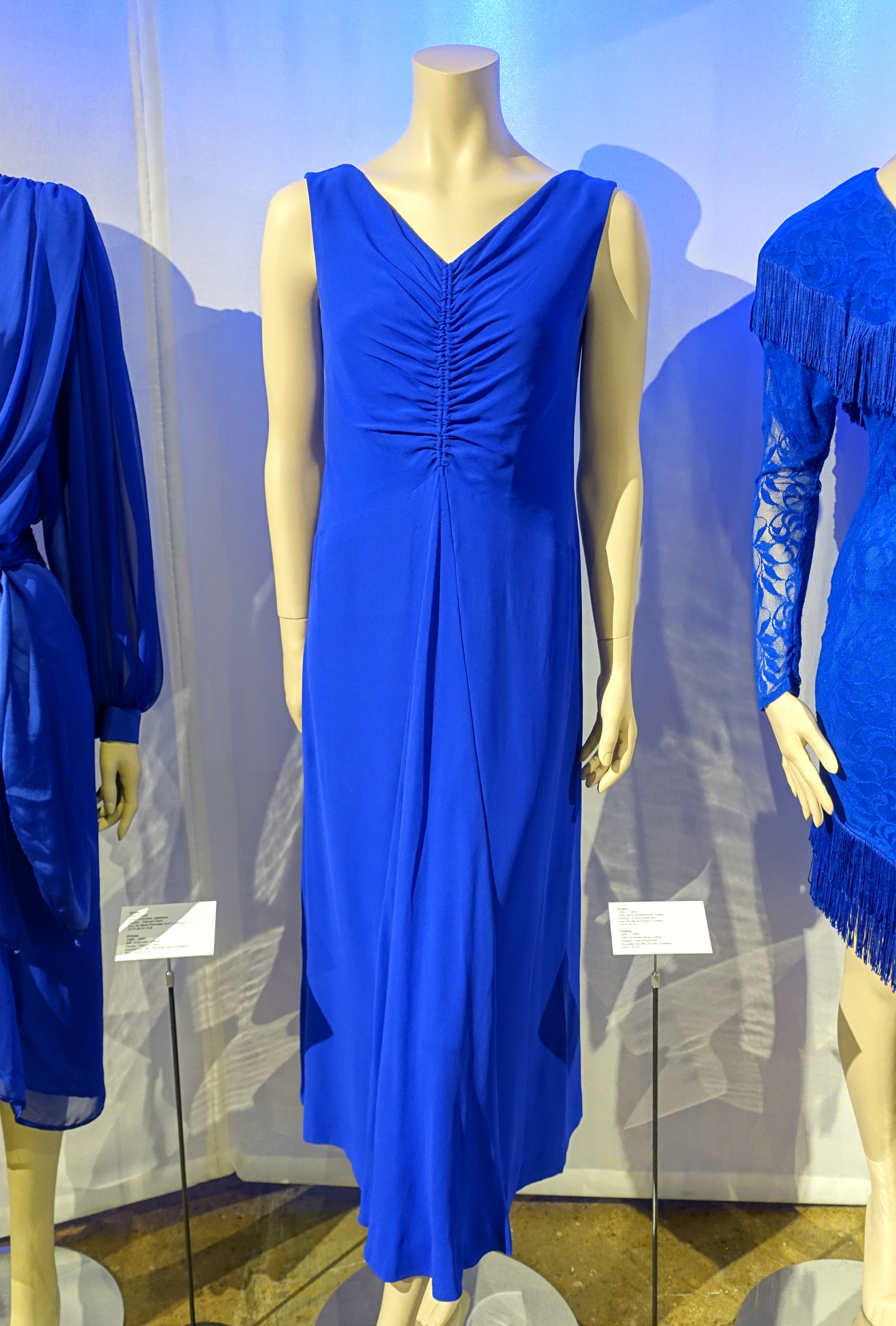
Silk Dress, 1969

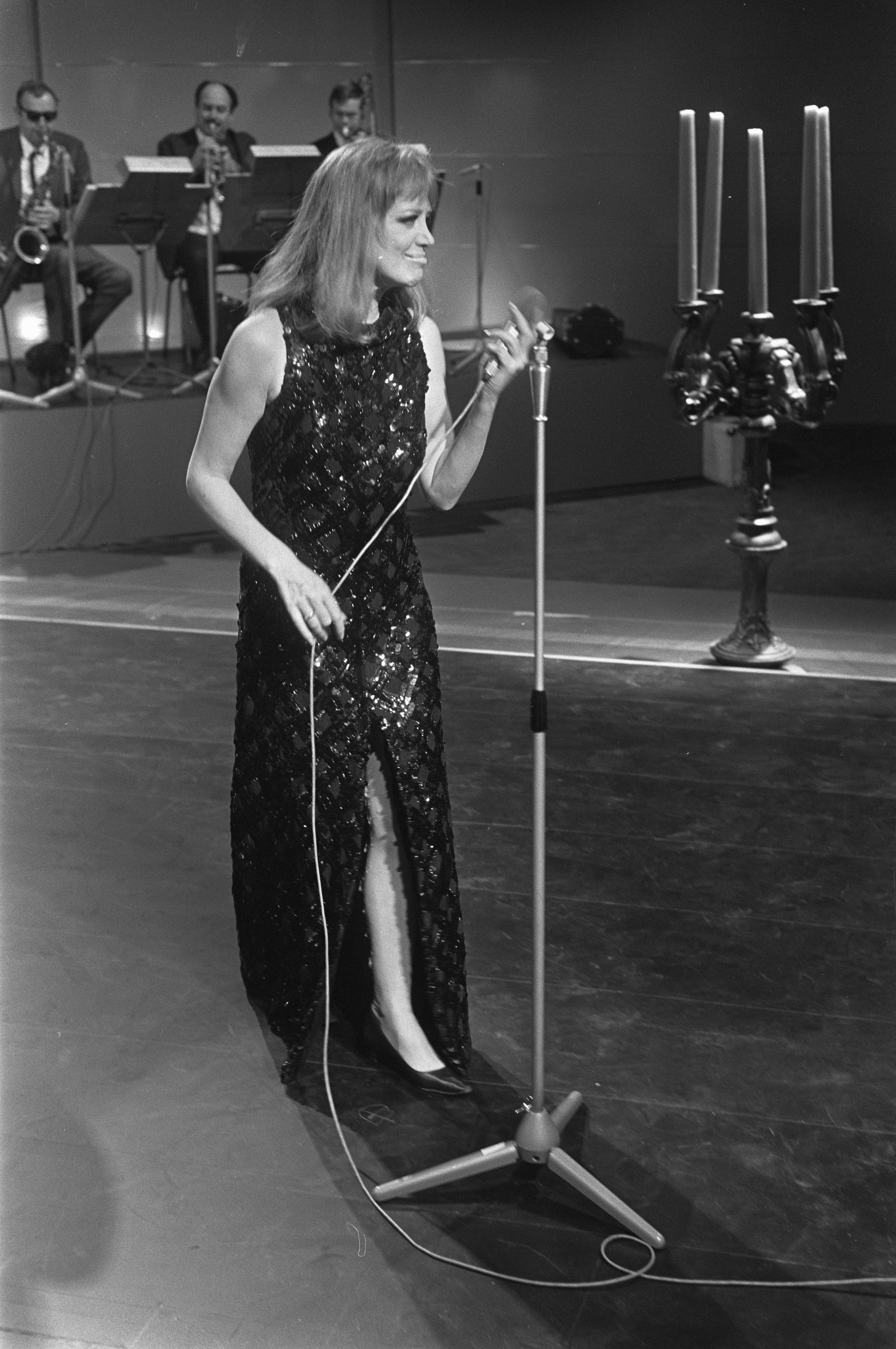
Hildegard Knef in Balmain, 1969

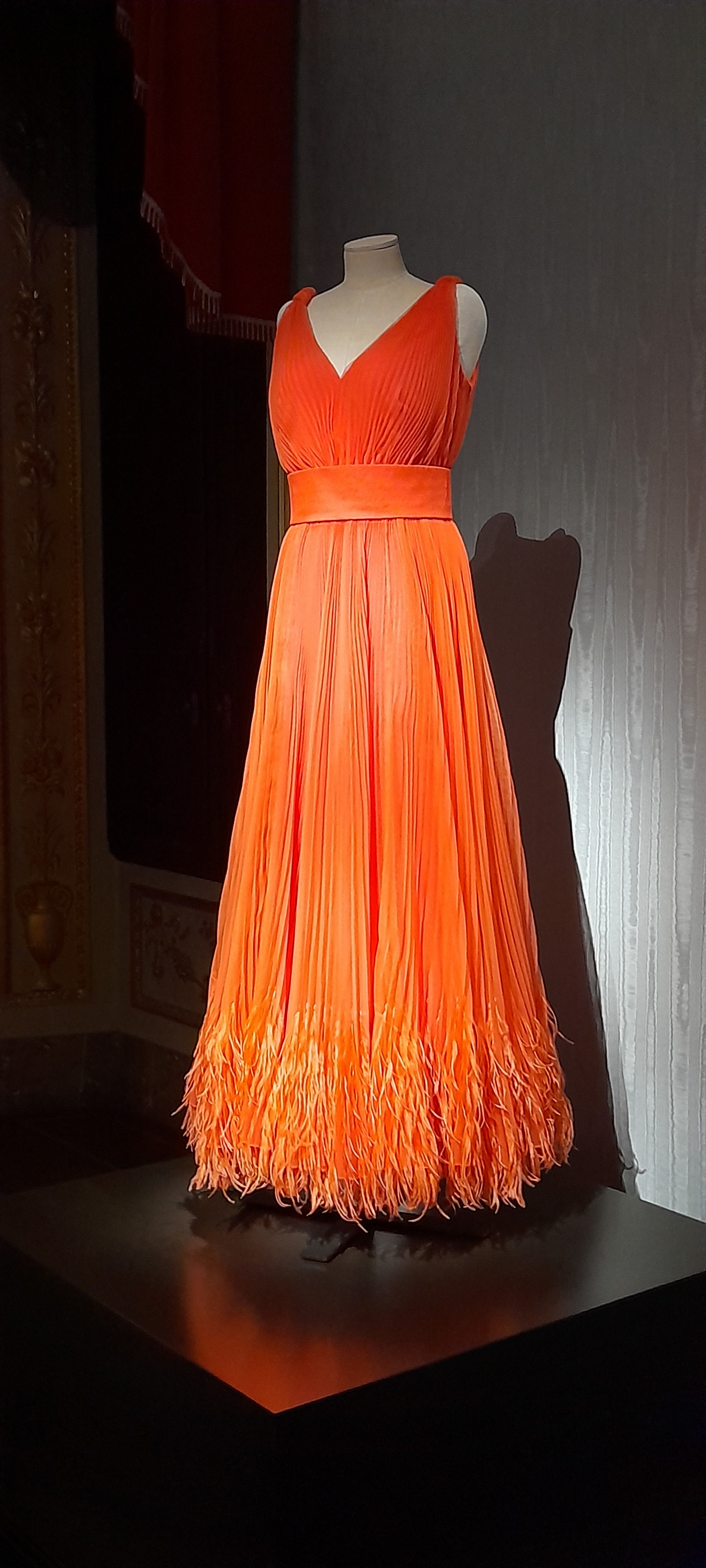
Evening Dress, 1970

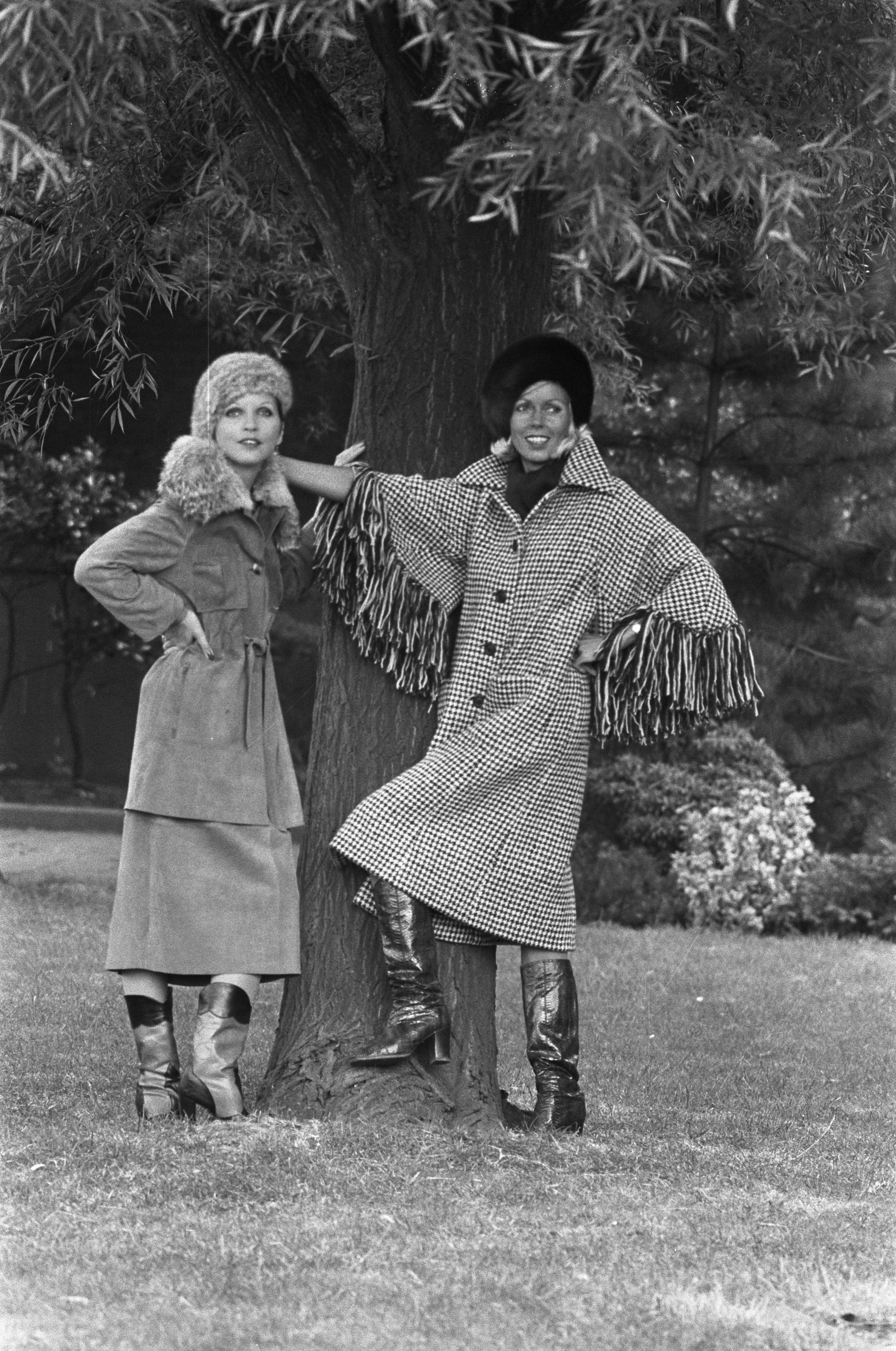
Winter Wear, 1975

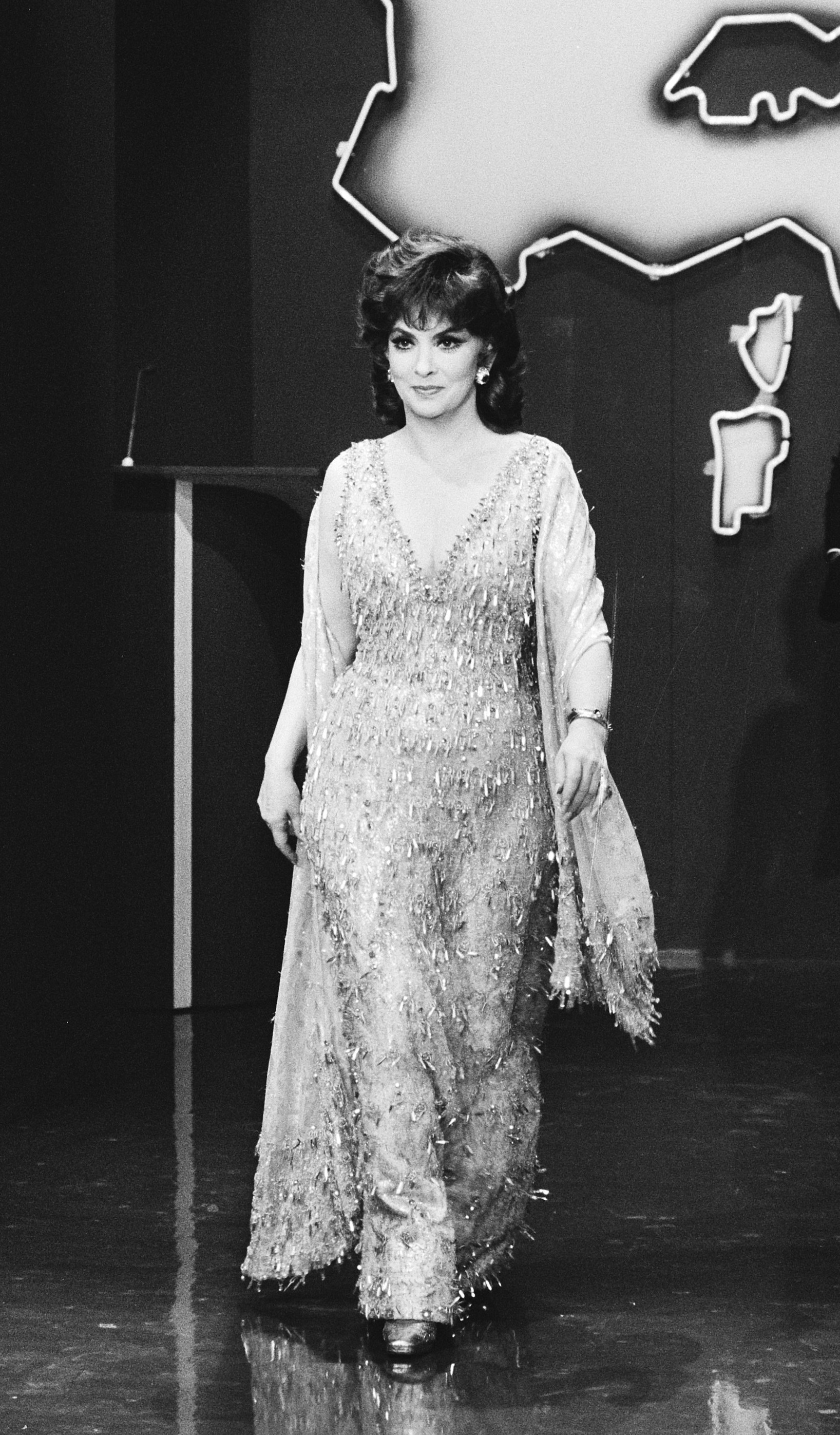
Gina Lollobrigida in Balmain 1979

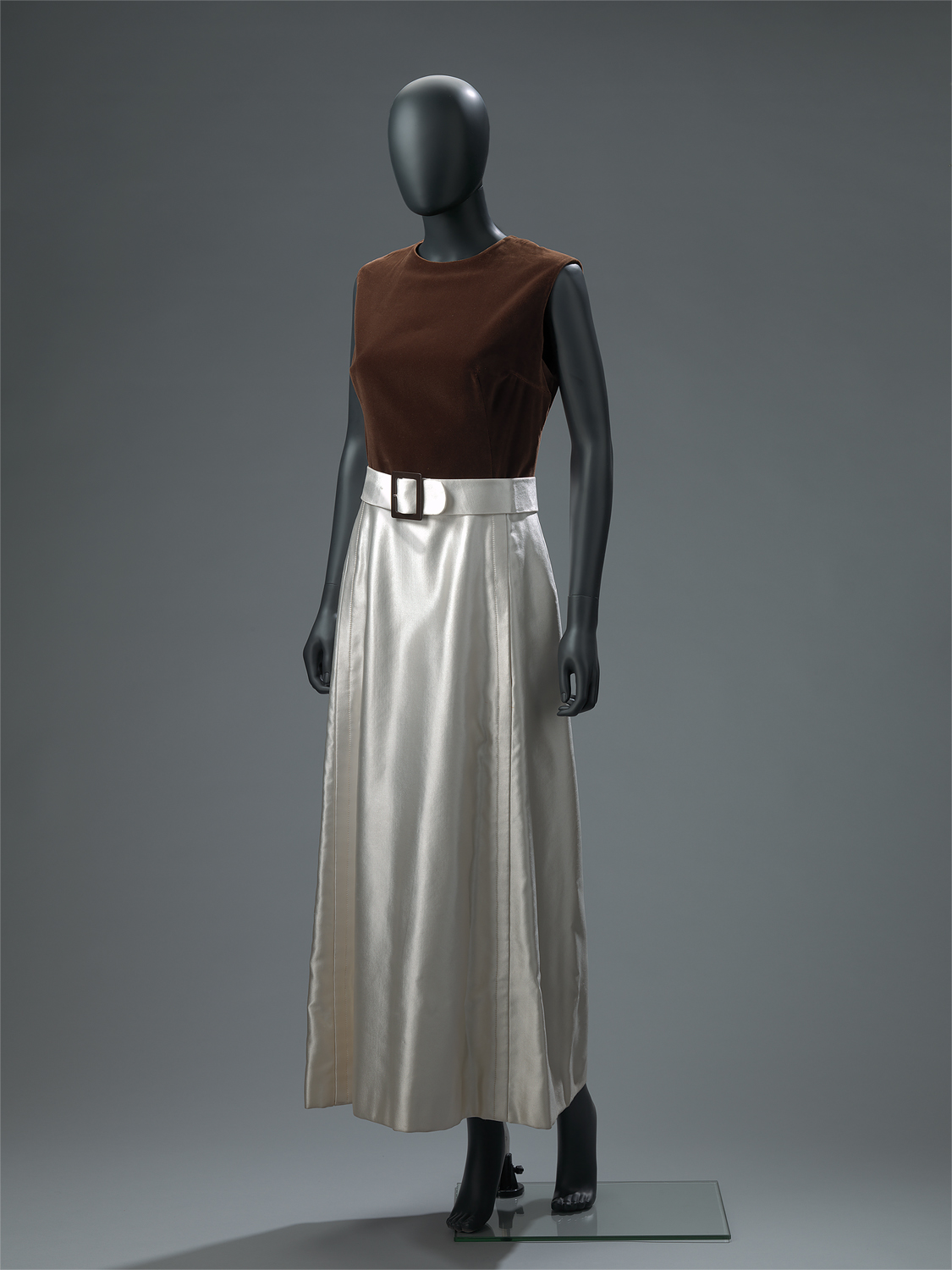
Satin Skirt and Cashmere Top, 1979

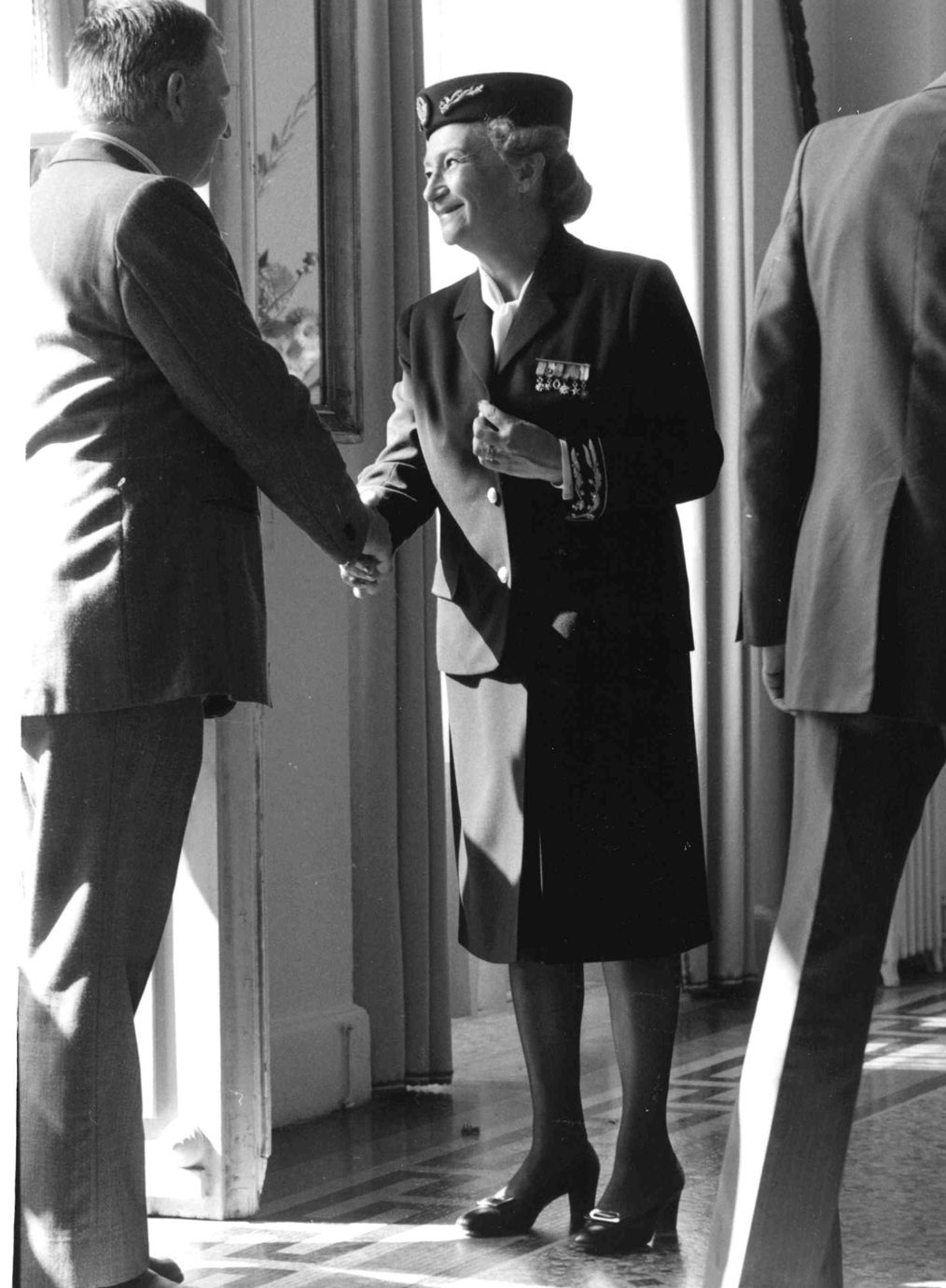
The French Civil Service Uniform, 1981
