= FIBA–EuroLeague dispute =

Dispute over control of European basketball competitions

The FIBA–EuroLeague Basketball controversy is a historical dispute between FIBA Europe and EuroLeague Basketball over control of the European-wide club basketball competitions. It initially started as a dispute between FIBA Europe and ULEB.

== Background ==
ULEB was founded in 1991 from the Italian, Spanish and French leagues in an attempt to promote their clubs financial interests within the FIBA competitions. The union was celebrated with the ULEB All-Star Game, held annually for three seasons, featuring stars from the three leagues and also NBA guests like Charles Barkley, Scottie Pippen and Michael Jordan. In 1996 the Greek league joined ULEB.

The Champions Cup was originally established by FIBA Europe, and it operated under its umbrella from 1958 until summer 2000, concluding with the 1999–00 season. In the 1990s the name changed to European League as runners-up were also included in the competition and the teams competed in groups rather than knock-out games. In 1996 it was renamed to FIBA EuroLeague.

== History ==
=== 2000-01 split ===
In May 2000, ULEB under its president Eduardo Portela, representing the richest and most popular European basketball clubs from Spain, Italy and Greece, decided to take over the competition under the name of ULEB Euroleague, against FIBA and Borislav Stanković's will. Stanković's stiff stance over the top European clubs' demand seemed to play a major role in their decision. At the time FIBA's media company handling the TV rights distribution was ISL. The new competition was financially backed by Telefonica, a Spanish multinational telecommunications company which offered 35 million dollars per season for the next 4 years (2000-2004). EuroLeague immediately hired 54 FIBA referees, with Kostas Rigas as the commissioner.

FIBA's biggest mistake was that it had never trademarked the "EuroLeague" name, even though it had used it since the mid-nineties. The leading European clubs therefore used the EuroLeague name for their new competition which started in 2000. FIBA responded by launching their new SuproLeague competition.

Most of the leading clubs joined EuroLeague, although Panathinaikos, Maccabi Tel Aviv and CSKA Moscow stayed with FIBA who threatened to ban EuroLeague teams from their domestic leagues. Federations from Turkey, France and Russia did not allow their teams to apply for the new competition, but only for the FIBA sanctioned SuproLeague.

The 2000 split had as a result the cancellation of the very successful FIBA All-Star Game in the 2000-01 season as many of the best players (Dejan Bodiroga, Manu Ginobili, Alphonso Ford) were playing in EuroLeague. At the end of 2000-01 there were two European champions: Maccabi Tel Aviv from FIBA and Virtus Bologna from ULEB. The latter changed the format of the EuroLeague with a best of three final and no Final Four, while SuproLeague hosted it in Paris.

In February 2001, delegation from the both sides met with an aim to unify the competitions as it was clear that European basketball could not financially handle two top tournaments. Eduardo Portella and Jordi Bertomeu from ULEB and Borislav Stanković, Patrick Baumann, Giorgos Vassilakopoulos and Shimon Mizrahi from FIBA. Following the 2000–01 season, the ULEB (Euroleague Basketball) seemed to be in a better position than FIBA Europe, having wealthy Telefonica on its side and already trademarked the Euroleague name, while SuproLeague was discontinued after a single season. FIBA's media company reportedly owed 152 million dollars without paying the SuproLeague teams over their TV rights. Thus, Maccabi, Panathinaikos and CSKA Moscow decided to join EuroLeague.

In 2001 FIBA agreed to give up the running of Europe's top competition and the 2001-02 Euroleague was a unified competition with ULEB as the main organiser. International Sport and Leisure and Media Pro Agency would both sponsor the competition. Telefonica owned 70 percent of the league in partnership with the EuroLeague itself (25 percent), and the Media Pro agency (5 percent).

After a new argument with ULEB in October 2001, FIBA attempted to launched its own top competition, the FIBA Champions Cup in 2002. Korać Cup and Saporta Cup were abolished for that reason. The Champions Cup which featured 15 domestic champions failed to become a competitive league to the Euroleague, despite Euroleague's financial debts to its teams. On 22 July 2002 ULEB had also announced the launch the ULEB Cup as its 2nd tier competition. Euroleague teams like Panathinaikos and Unicaja Malaga seemed close to choosing the FIBA Champions Cup, but they decided to stay and strengthen ULEB's position. In 2002 Telefónica also extended its commitment to the EuroLeague until 2009. Telefónica had originally agreed to pump in $35 million a season for five seasons under the original deal, but that amount was reduced when the agreement was prolonged.

In May 2003 following ULEB's financial problems, FIBA decided to create a new competition with 30 teams, similar to SuproLeague. At the time EuroLeague seemed to owe money to its clubs and the new FIBA project was presented appealing as the teams would be free to negotiate their broadcasting rights. While top teams like Panathinaikos and Olympiacos BC seemed to be tempted, at the end only a total of 11 champions and runners-up joined the FIBA Europe League.

In November 2004, FIBA and EuroLeague officially came to an agreement, to take effect as of the 2005–06 season. FIBA agreed to sanction the two top tournaments, but these would be run by ULEB, whilst FIBA would directly run the other European club tournaments, the FIBA EuroCup and the FIBA EuroChallenge. An official contract was signed by both sides, regulating the organization of club competitions in Europe and ULEB's obligation was to pay annually a fee of €400,000 to FIBA Europe.

=== 2002: FIBA creates new club competitions ===
During the 2001-02 season FIBA fell out with ULEB and removed its support from the new unified Euroleague. Instead, FIBA launched the 2002–03 FIBA Europe Champions Cup in an attempt to revive the FIBA Euroleague (1958-2001). For this purpose, FIBA tried to lure a few Euroleague teams, including Panathinaikos who seriously considered moving back to FIBA.

On the other hand, ULEB created a new rival competition, the ULEB Cup which forced FIBA to abolish the Korac Cup and the Saporta Cup. ULEB Cup was a success and ULEB decided to extend the teams from 24 to 36 for the 2003-04 season, while FIBA launched a new competition as its top tier, the FIBA Europe League. At the same time ULEB refuge to a loan from Banca Catalunya following difficulties from Telefónica to sponsor its two competitions.

In November 2004, FIBA and ULEB came to an agreement that the Euroleague and ULEB Cup teams couldn't exceed 48. In the summer of 2006, ULEB broke the agreement increasing the number of its teams.

=== 2009: ECA takes over ===
ECA was founded in 2006 and it gradually started limiting ULEB's role in the running of its two competitions. In 2008, when Eduardo Portela stepped down, ULEB became more cooperative with FIBA. As soon as EuroLeague competition was transferred from ULEB to ECA in 2009, ULEB remained a minority shareholder via EuroLeague Basketball, but lost control over the competition.

Since 2010, ECA has undertaken ULEB's obligation to pay the annual fee of €400,000 to FIBA Europe. However, ECA purported to terminate the agreement in December 2012, invoking the announced change to the FIBA calendar as of 2017.

=== 2015-17 controversy ===
==== FIBA Europe Cup and Champions League ====
In June 2015, FIBA announced it would start a new league to compete with EuroLeague Basketball. The new competition replaced FIBA EuroChallenge. In October 2015, FIBA also announced its new plans for a new top-tier semi-closed competition in a round-robin format and tried to take the helm by convincing eight of the twelve teams with a EuroLeague A-licence at the time, to play in a new FIBA competition, Basketball Champions League. This proposal that would leave Unicaja Malaga, Tau, Olimpia Milano and Zalgiris out, was unanimously rejected by the clubs who soon published a new identical format for the Euroleague. The other 8 spots would have remained open for clubs via the domestic leagues, with two qualifying rounds.

In November 2015, EuroLeague Basketball agreed to a 10-year marketing joint venture with IMG, which would invest 35 million euros per season. In its press release, the EuroLeague announced a new competition format for the 2016–17 season, identical to the one proposed by FIBA, with only 16 teams including eleven A-license clubs who signed for 10 years, instead of three (Anadolu Efes, Baskonia, CSKA Moscow, FC Barcelona, Fenerbahçe, Maccabi Tel Aviv, Olimpia Milano, Olympiacos, Panathinaikos, Real Madrid, and Žalgiris), playing in only one group with a double round-robin, with the top eight playing in a best-of-five playoffs round to decide qualification to the 2017 EuroLeague Final Four.

After its initial proposal was rejected, FIBA changed the format of the Basketball Champions League, with qualification based on performance. This competition was officially launched on 22 March 2016.

==== Threats of suspension ====
Despite the offer of FIBA to all European national basketball federations, many clubs instead agreed with EuroLeague to participate in the 2016–17 EuroLeague, or 2016–17 EuroCup. Regional leagues like the Adriatic League and VTB United League, as well as many national domestic leagues, signed contracts with EuroLeague Basketball for the right to participate in its competitions.

Because of this, FIBA threatened to suspend 14 European basketball federations from EuroBasket 2017. Notified national organisations were given until 20 April 2016 to explain their stance.

National basketball federation	Men's national team
Basketball Federation of Bosnia and Herzegovina	Bosnia and Herzegovina
(Croatia) Croatian Basketball Federation	Croatia
(Greece) Hellenic Basketball Federation	Greece
Israel Basketball Association	Israel
(Italy) Italian Basketball Federation	Italy
(Lithuania) Lithuanian Basketball Federation	Lithuania
(Spain) Spanish Basketball Federation	Spain
Basketball Federation of Montenegro	Montenegro
Basketball Federation of North Macedonia	North Macedonia
(Poland) Polish Basketball Association	Poland
(Russia) Russian Basketball Federation	Russia
Basketball Federation of Serbia	Serbia
Basketball Federation of Slovenia	Slovenia
(Turkey) Turkish Basketball Federation	Turkey

On 16 April, FIBA asked Germany to take over the hosting of the 2016 FIBA World Olympic Qualifying Tournament from Italy, which was at risk of suspension. In the end, no suspensions were applied.

==== Reactions ====
===== Greece =====
Georgios Nikolaou, director of communications of AEK Athens, after its defeat against PAOK, in the first game of the Greek League quarterfinals, stated that his club, "will not be blackmailed by anyone, and doesn’t get any kind of messages by anyone".

===== Lithuania =====
On 20 April 2016, the Lithuanian Basketball Federation suspended BC Lietuvos Rytas for their agreement with EuroLeague. Subsequently, the club from Vilnius would be disqualified from the Lithuanian Basketball League (LKL). Remigijus Milašius, president of the LKL, refuted their arguments and said that FIBA "promised a lot of money, which they do not even have".

Šarūnas Jasikevičius, head coach of Lithuanian team BC Žalgiris, argued that "playing in a FIBA tournament means taking a 20-year step back".

===== Russia =====
Andrei Kirilenko, president of the Russian Basketball Federation, requested the VTB United League to suspend the participation of all Russian teams in ULEB competitions. He also said the contract with VTB would be voided if the league refuses.

===== Spain =====
Francisco Roca, president of the Spanish ACB, said "the ban is unfair and unfounded", there is not any ban for Spanish teams from playing in FIBA competitions, despite agreeing to the contract with EuroLeague Basketball.

The Spanish Basketball Federation requested that the ACB suspend its agreement with the EuroLeague. The ACB answered stating that it cannot impede clubs from joining their tournaments, and that the possible suspension of the Spanish national team was not its fault.

On 13 May, the Supreme Council for Sports of Spain unilaterally cancelled the agreement between the ACB and EuroLeague, with the aim to avoid the suspension to the men's national team. The Clubs Association (ACB) regretted the action of the council, arguing that it restricts the clubs' freedom to choose the competition they want to play in. Also, it reminded that FIBA did not explain the reasons for the possible suspension.

===== Slovenia =====
The Slovenian Basketball Federation, despite the possible suspension of its national team, supports FIBA in "its efforts to take action against ECA’s allegedly anti-competitive and illegal practices", but does not understand the suspension, as the federation does not have any rights in the Adriatic League.

==== Suspension of ABA League ====
On 13 April, ABA League, comprising teams from the former SFR Yugoslavia, agreed with EuroLeague on a four-year contract, for one EuroLeague and three EuroCup spots.

Because of this agreement, FIBA threatened to suspend the six national federations, and on 30 April it suspended ABA League. This official recognition was in place since 2009. Krešimir Novosel, director of ABA League, said that he was unsure about reasons for suspension, after the ABA had reformed its league to follow the criteria of FIBA.

==== Collaboration proposals ====
On 3 May, EuroLeague presented a collaboration proposal to FIBA, with integration into EuroLeague governance, and the possibility of accepting the new playing windows schedule for the FIBA World Cup qualifying games as main points.

Two days later, FIBA sent a letter to EuroLeague, requesting that they agree that FIBA's newly formed Champions League becomes the new European-wide second-tier competition instead of EuroCup, agree to the new FIBA national team calendar, and on the future expansion of the EuroLeague to 24 teams.

=== Threats of suspension of teams ===
==== Israel ====
On 28 June, the Israel Basketball Association (IBA) informed that Hapoel Jerusalem, which signed a contract to participate in the EuroCup, would not be allowed to register and play in the Israeli Basketball Premier League. In response, Maccabi Tel Aviv, one of the teams with EuroLeague A-license, announced that they would possibly also refuse to register to the Premier League.

==== Italy ====
In July 2016 it was announced that Reggio Emilia, Dinamo Sassari, Trento, and Cantu would be withdrawing from the EuroCup. Had the teams not pulled out of EuroCup, they would have been excluded from Serie A.

==== Russia ====
On 27 June, just after participants of the 2016–17 EuroLeague and EuroCup Basketball were revealed, Andrei Kirilenko, president of the Russian Basketball Federation, announced that the four Russian participants in EuroCup (Khimki, Lokomotiv Kuban, Nizhny Novgorod, and Zenit Saint Petersburg) would be disqualified from national domestic competitions, and that their players would be banned from playing with the Russian national team.

==== Spain ====
On 2 August, Jorge Garbajosa, recently elected as president of the Spanish Basketball Federation, sent a letter to the six Spanish clubs that were registered in the EuroCup (Bilbao, Fuenlabrada, Gran Canaria, Málaga, Murcia, and Valencia), accusing them of violating the rules of Spain's Supreme Council of Sports. This organisation of the Spanish government had previously cancelled the ACB-EuroLeague agreement.

==== Greece ====
The Hellenic Basketball Federation initially threatened to ban AEK Athens from the Greek Basket League, if it did not switch from the EuroCup to FIBA's Basketball Champions League. After AEK initially refused to switch to the Champions League, the Hellenic Basketball Federation then refused to grant Greek League player licenses for all of AEK's new signings. if they remained in the EuroCup. As a result of this, AEK had no other choice but switch to the Champions League.

=== Expansion of the Basketball Champions League ===
On 19 August, FIBA announced the expansion of its Basketball Champions League to 40 teams in the regular season, after allowing AEK Athens, Partizan and Stelmet Zielona Góra to play in it. The three teams previously withdrew from the EuroCup, weeks after this competition announced groups and schedule.

As consequence of this, the EuroCup reduced its competition to 20 teams.

==== Return to threats of suspension ====
In November 2016, FIBA sent new letters to the national federations of Slovenia, Montenegro and North Macedonia, asking them to take measures against clubs which compete in EuroCup. After this, Montenegrin federation suspended Budućnost VOLI from all domestic competitions.

==== Promotion from Basketball Champions League to EuroLeague ====
In November 2016, FIBA returned to talk with EuroLeague Basketball, wishing a EuroLeague spot to the Champions League winner, but EuroLeague Basketball CEO replied this would mean jump from European third to first division in an attempt to finish with EuroCup.

==== Return of Italian, French and Turkish clubs to EuroCup ====
In January 2017, the Italian clubs wanted to return to EuroCup. In February, the French clubs also wanted to return, despite French basketball federation is one of the most faithful supporters of Basketball Champions League. In March, Italian federation said it will give freedom to join any European competition from 2017–18 based on sports merit. Days later, Turkish Basketball Federation made the same statement, and French club ASVEL Basket, chaired by NBA player Tony Parker, confirmed it will join EuroCup.

=== Luxembourg court decision ===
On 26 June 2017, the Luxembourg Commercial Court issued a favorable ruling for FIBA Europe amidst the long standing dispute with EuroLeague Basketball. EuroLeague Properties was called to pay the sum of €900.000 to FIBA Europe, plus an additional fee of €1,500 and take care of all the costs by trial procedures. The court also decided that introduction of the new calendar doesn’t mean a contract breach from FIBA Europe. This was the case made by EuroLeague Properties for declining to pay the fee from 2012 to 2015.

=== National teams windows ===
For the 2019 World Cup, FIBA established a new qualification system, using six weekends during the 2017–18 and 2018–19 seasons, when the qualifiers will interrupt the club competitions.

In May 2017, the National Basketball Association made a statement that the NBA teams will not loan their players to the national teams. Days later, Euroleague Basketball's CEO Jordi Bertomeu made the same statement.

=== 2020: ULEB with FIBA against ECA ===
In October 2020, ULEB representing 11 major basketball leagues in Europe, and a minority shareholder in EuroLeague Basketball, asked EU antitrust enforcers to act against organiser EuroLeague Commercial Assets (ECA) for allegedly blocking other teams from taking part in EuroLeague. ULEB president Tomas Van Den Spiegel said in a statement: "We believe that all of our clubs must be able to compete at the highest level and we want to keep the dream of international basketball alive for every club at every level. The alleged anti-competitive behaviour includes EuroLeague granting 10-year licences to the 11 shareholder clubs without any transparent award process and reducing the number of available slots in the competition to just 18 from 24". The commission confirmed receipt of the complaint, saying it would assess it.

=== 2025: NBA and FIBA's plan for a new top-tier competition ===
The creation of the new Euroleague in 2000, brought ULEB and Euroleague Basketball closer to the NBA and exhibition games were held between Euroleague and NBA teams from 2007 until 2015: NBA Live Europe and Euroeague American Tour. However, NBA got closer to FIBA after the 2015 controversy of the latter with the Euroleague Basketball.

In 2021, Euroleague Basketball, FIBA and NBA met and the latter proposed the possibility of a streaming partnership, integrating all basketball competitions under their jurisdiction. However, there was no agreement.

On March, 27, 2025 NBA and FIBA Europe announced the creation of a new top-tier European league, provisionally known as NBA Europe. The league would feature 16 teams: 8 of them (or 12) with a permanent licence, while the rest would qualify via their domestic leagues and the Basketball Champions League. Euroleague shareholder clubs, like Real Madrid, Barcelona, ASVEL and Fenerbahce have been rumoured to be in discussions with NBA and FIBA to switch alliances and join the new competition dubbed as NBA Europe , set to start in 2026 or 2027. It would be the second joint-project by NBA and FIBA following the Basketball Africa League.

Euroleague Basketball having seen the threat of the new planned league, rushed to strike a new deal with the majority of its clubs with a permanent licence who committed to renew until 2036. The prospect of the NBA Europe League and the potential loss of major shareholders to a rival top competition made Euroleague Basketball establish a new promotional motto “born not built” for the 2025-26 season, a hint to opposing the idea of the new planned league by NBA and FIBA.

Other former Euroleague Basketball teams linked to the new project are Unicaja Malaga, Alba Berlin, Galatasaray, and AEK. Possible cities that could have a team in the new league (potentially including clubs from the current Euroleague) are:

- Paris
- Madrid
- London
- Manchester
- Barcelona
- Milan
- Berlin
- Istanbul
- Athens
- Rome

On October 6-8, 2025, NBA, FIBA and Euroleague met in Geneva and Barcelona regarding the new joint-venture. NBA made it clear to Euroleague that is interested in many of its shareholders clubs to join the NBA Europe with a guaranteed spot, but not all of them. NBA and FIBA also confirmed that the new league would have 12 permanent licenses and 4 on a qualification annual base.

Euroleague Basketball insisted that all its thirteen shareholder clubs should be fully integrated into the new European league. However, NBA's plan was only for some of those thirteen clubs—rumored to be Real Madrid, Barcelona, Fenerbahçe, Armani Milano, and possibly ASVEL— to become permanent members straight away, while all the rest would qualify via the BCL or the domestic leagues.

== See also ==
- NBA Europe
- European Super League

== Sources ==
- The 2000 split
- FIBA vs ULEB
