= TU Me =

Mobile application by Telefónica

TU / TU Me
- Developer: Telefónica
- Initial release: May 2012 (TU Me); relaunched January 2024 (TU)
- Platform: iOS, Android, Web
- Website: www.tu.com

TU (formerly TU Me) is a digital platform developed by Telefónica and operated through its subsidiary Telefónica Innovación Digital. Initially launched in 2012 as a messaging app under the name *TU Me*, the brand was later revived in 2024 to designate a new suite of digital products focused on privacy, cybersecurity, and digital identity.

== TU Me (2012–2014) ==
TU Me was a free mobile application released by Telefónica in May 2012. It allowed users to make voice calls, send texts, share photos and locations, and store conversation history in the cloud. The app was available for iOS and Android platforms, positioned as an alternative to services like WhatsApp and Viber.

Despite early interest, TU Me was discontinued a few years later and removed from major app stores. Telefónica did not continue development of this version beyond its initial release cycle.

== TU (2024–present) ==
In January 2024, Telefónica relaunched the brand TU through its technology subsidiary Telefónica Innovación Digital. Unlike its predecessor, the new TU is not a messaging app but a digital product platform offering solutions in cybersecurity, identity management, and cryptographic technology.

The project includes a range of services built with technologies such as artificial intelligence, blockchain, and post-quantum cryptography. It operates independently from Movistar and targets both individual users and businesses.

Notable products include:

- Latch: a digital access control system for securing user accounts.
- VerifAI: an AI-based tool for detecting manipulated media (images, audio, video).
- Metashield: software to identify and remove hidden metadata in documents.
- Wallet: a digital wallet for managing crypto-assets.
- Quantum Drop: encrypted file transfer system using post-quantum technology.
- Quantum Encryption: a security tool for IoT and private networks.
- Gallery: a blockchain-based digital art marketplace.

== See also ==
- Telefónica
- Digital identity
- Post-quantum cryptography
- Blockchain
