= Talmon Marco =

Israeli-American entrepreneur

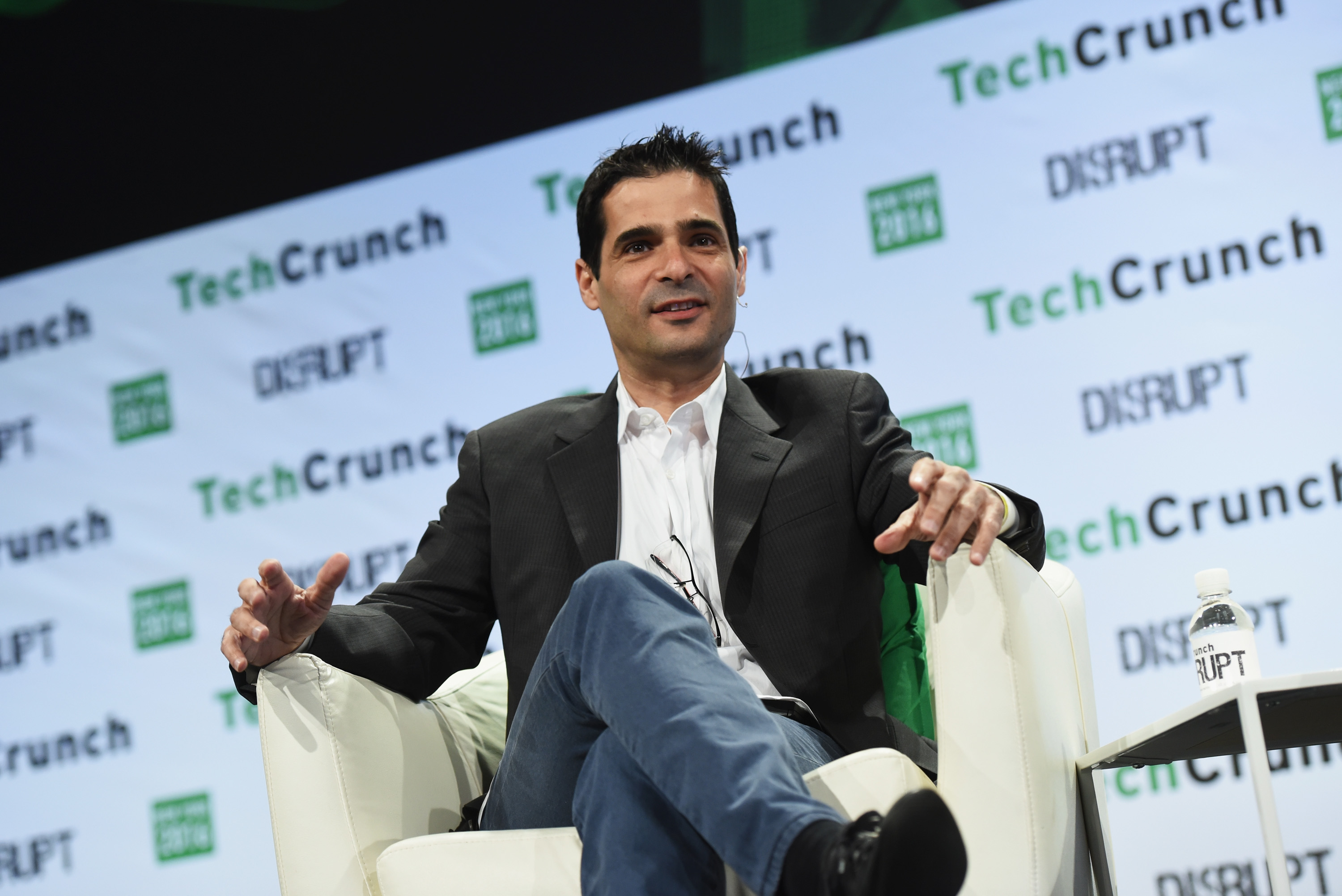
- Marco at TechCrunch Disrupt in New York in 2016
- Born: 1973 (age 52–53); Israel
- Education: Tel-Aviv University
- Occupation: Entrepreneur
- Known for: Co-Founder of Viber and Juno

Talmon Marco is an Israeli-American entrepreneur, best known as the founder of H2Pro, founder and former CEO of Viber, a proprietary cross-platform instant messaging VoIP application for smartphones, and Juno, a ride sharing service.

== Career ==
Born in Israel, Marco served as CIO for the Israel Defense Forces Pikud Merkaz. He completed a degree in computer science and management from Tel-Aviv University, later moving to the U.S. where he spent most of his adult life.

In 1997 he co-founded Expand Networks and served as the company's president until 2004.

In 1998, Marco co-founded iMesh, where he was president until 2010.

In 2010 he co-founded Viber with Igor Magazinnik, a friend from the Israel Defense Forces, and served as its CEO. In 2014, Rakuten acquired the company for $900 million.

In 2016, he founded Juno, a ride-sharing app. In 2017, Gett acquired the company for $200 million.

In 2019, he co-founded H2Pro, a climate-tech company looking to produce Green Hydrogen at scale. The company raised over $100 million from BEV (Bill Gates’ climate fund) and others.
