= It's on the Meter =

2011 round-the-world motoring expedition

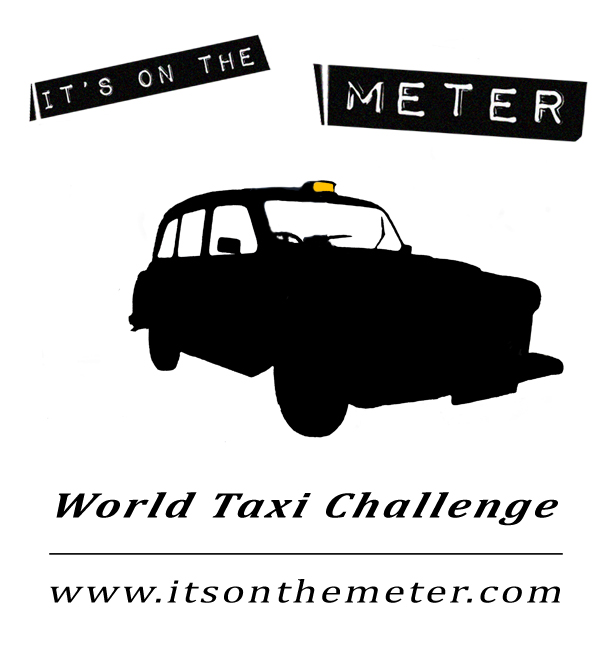
It's on the Meter logo

It's on the Meter – World Taxi Challenge was a round-the-world motoring expedition that broke the Guinness World Records for the longest ever journey by taxi and the highest altitude ever reached by taxi. The expedition's three-man team used a 1992 Fairway Driver London Black Cab to drive 43,319.5 miles (69,716.12 km) around the world.

The expedition officially began at the London Transport Museum on 17 February 2011 and finished at the same point on 11 May 2012 having circumnavigated the globe. The team raised £20,000 for the British Red Cross; the nominal meter fee for the finished journey was £79,006.80.

== History ==
The expedition was conceived of in 2008 when the participants were travelling by taxi and wondered how high a taxi meter fee had ever been.

The team researched the previous record which stood at 21,691 miles (34,908 km) and was set in 1994. The team then planned a new route from London to Sydney with an estimated distance of 32,000 miles, bought a taxi for £1,500 on eBay and began securing sponsorship.

The expedition departed from the London Transport Museum on 17 February 2011 with support from Boris Johnson and Ranulph Fiennes.

The team broke the previous record in August 2011 in Tibet having travelled through 34 countries.

The expedition arrived in Sydney, Australia, nine months after setting off from London having travelled through forty-one countries and three continents.

Upon arrival in Sydney the team announced that they had secured a sponsorship partnership with Smartphone Taxi ordering-app company GetTaxi and would be extending the expedition back to London via the United States, Israel, Russia and Europe.

The vehicle was shipped from Sydney to San Francisco over the Christmas of 2011 and the team continued the journey from California to New York before air-freighting the car to Israel in March 2012.

The expedition then shipped from Israel to Greece before continuing back through Russia, Europe and Spain and finishing in London on 11 May 2012.

== Route ==
The route was designed to take “the longest route ever, because taxi drivers always take all the longest way around,” and encompassed over fifty countries.

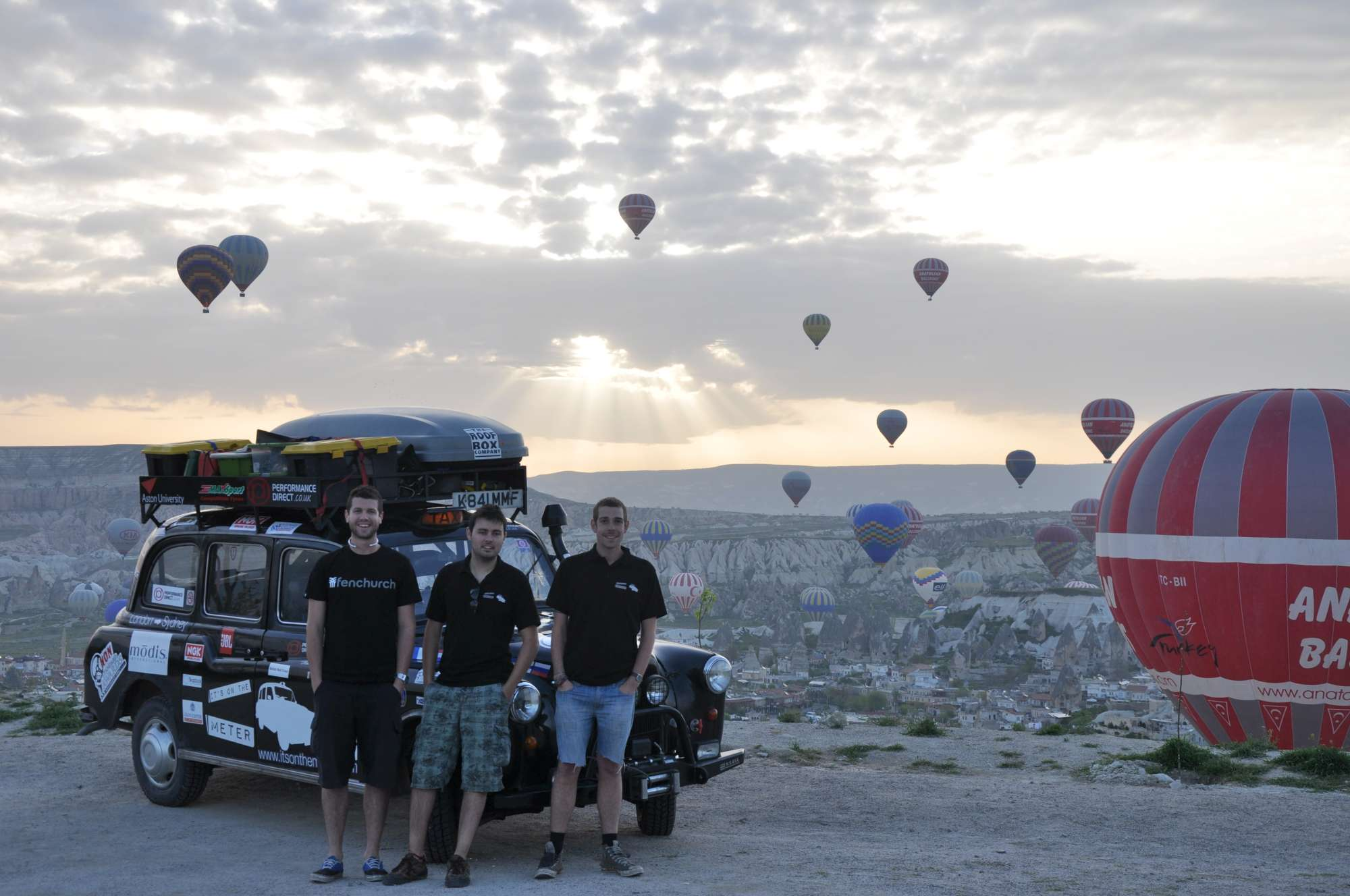
It's on the Meter team in Cappadocia, Turkey

The expedition started in Covent Garden, London before driving to Dover, England and ferrying over to France. The expedition then passed through Belgium, Netherlands, Germany, Denmark, Sweden and into Finland where the team drove to the Arctic Circle and saw the Northern Lights.

The expedition then travelled through Russia (the team were stopped by police, taken to a station, and questioned in Moscow), Belarus, Ukraine, Poland, Czech Republic, Austria, Germany, Liechtenstein, Switzerland, France, Monaco, Italy and San Marino. The original route took the team down to Sicily to catch a ferry to Tunisia but due to the conflict in Libya the route was revised to instead pass through the Balkans.

The team passed through Croatia, Bosnia, Montenegro, Kosovo, Macedonia and Greece before arriving in Turkey in April 2011. Due to the demonstrations in Syria the team further modified the route and next travelled to Georgia and Armenia before heading back into Turkey and down into Iraq. Whilst in northern Kurdistan their radiator burst but a replacement was built in Arbil auto bazaar and the team continued into Iran. Near the Qom the team were stopped and questioned by plain clothes police after mistakenly camping next to an artillery installation. At this point Archer and Purnell travelled by air to Dubai in order to obtain Pakistani visas and Ellison (who had already secured a visa in the UK) continued through the Baluchistan desert.

The team was reunited in Pakistan and continued through India, Nepal, Tibet (where the previous record's distance was broken) and China, arriving in Laos in September 2011. The journey then continued through Cambodia, Thailand and Malaysia before the vehicle was shipped from Singapore to Darwin, Australia.

On arrival in Australia the vehicle was subject to strict quarantine fines but upon its release travelled through the Northern Territory and down the East Coast, arriving at the intended destination on 10 December 2011.

At this point the team announced that they had partnered with a new sponsor, GetTaxi and now intended to drive the vehicle back to London having circumnavigated the world. The car was shipped from Sydney to San Francisco and the team returned to the UK for a Christmas break. After lengthy delays the car was released from Oakland Port in February 2012 and the team drove across the US, arriving at New York in March 2012. The car was then air-freighted to Israel from where it will be shipped to Greece before continuing north to Moscow.

The final leg headed through the Baltics and Eastern Europe before passing through Germany, Luxembourg and France. The car was then taken back to the United Kingdom via the Channel Tunnel and arrived back at the start point in London on 11 May 2012.

The mileage of the entire journey was 43,208.4 miles (69,537.18 km), more than double the previous record. The nominal taxi fare reached £79,006.80.

== Vehicles ==
The expedition vehicle was an extensively modified 1992 Austin FX4 taxi named Hannah, after the song Hard Hearted Hannah which tells of a woman who hates men and loves to see them suffer.

The vehicle was powered by a Nissan 2.7 litre Turbo Diesel engine which the team claimed was the only part of the car not to have broken stating that this is because it is "Japanese-made whereas the rest of the car was made in England".

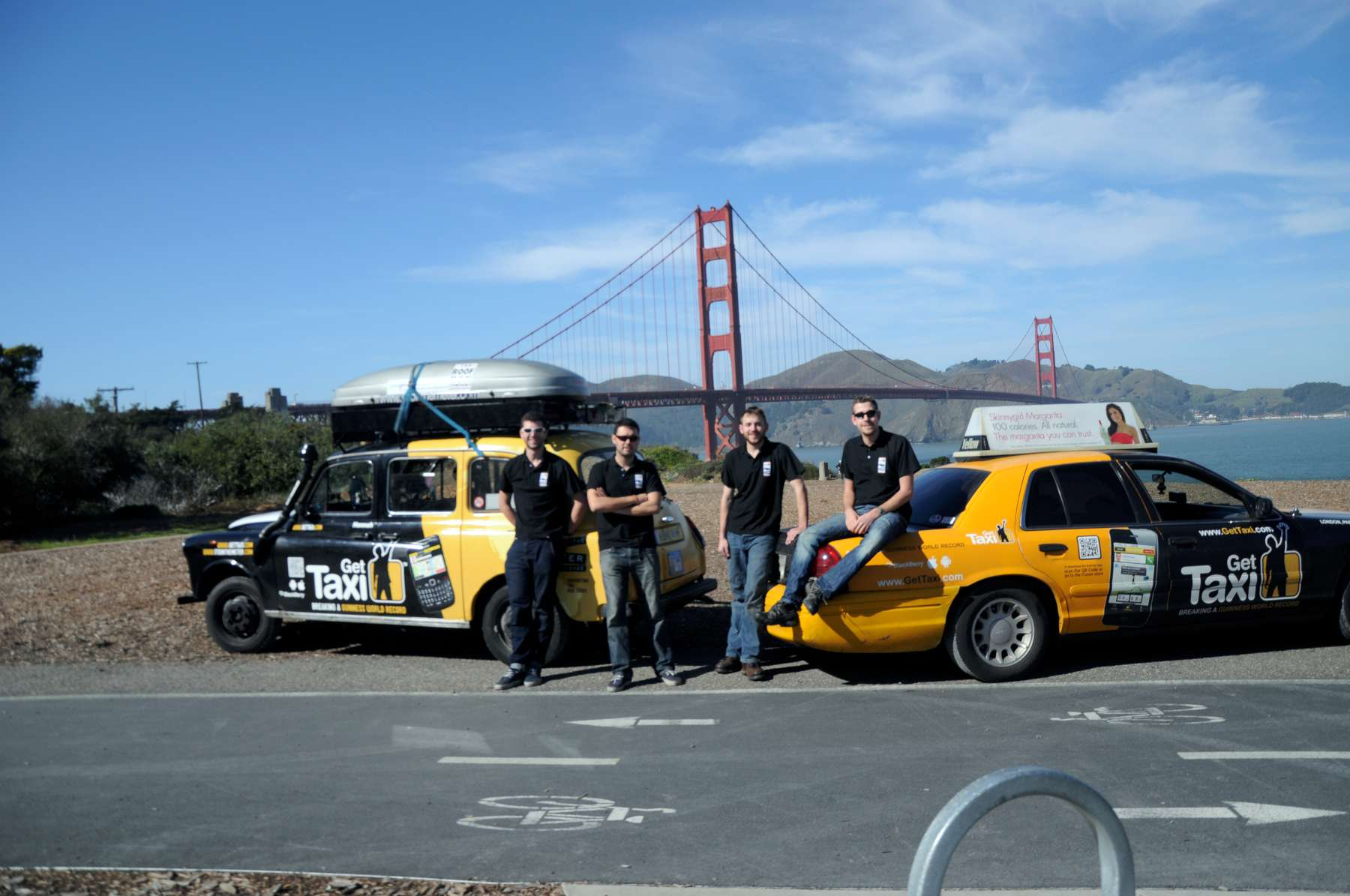
It's on the Meter expedition vehicles "Hannah" and "Skinny Margarita" with team members at the Golden Gate Bridge, San Francisco.

The car was purchased for £1,500 on eBay and modifications include the addition of winch, snorkel, roof rack and roof box. The car's brakes, suspension, cooling and electric systems were also overhauled and updated. Inside the partition between the driver and passengers was removed, a front passenger seat was added, the rear-facing rear seats were removed and a sound system was installed.

The mileage of the car when purchased was estimated at 300,000 miles and the team states that it broke down, "every other day".

The team did not have a support vehicle but was joined for the USA leg of the expedition by a United States Yellow Taxi. The team met Jon Anders, previously a resident of Texas, in Pakistan and joked, "If you buy a Yellow Cab you can join us for the US section". The driver took the team up on the offer and purchased a Ford Crown Victoria which was named Skinny Margarita after an old advertisement attached to the roof.

== Team ==
The expedition was conceived and organised by Leigh Purnell, Johno Ellison and Paul Archer, three friends who met whilst studying at Aston University.

== Charity ==
The expedition raised both awareness and funds for the British Red Cross. The team decided to choose the Red Cross due to the fundraising work they carry out both in the UK and Worldwide as well as the worldwide support they could offer the team. The expedition raised £20,000 for the charity.

== Book ==
A book, It's on the Meter: One Taxi, Three Mates and 43,000 Miles of Misadventures around the World, was released in 2016.

The team has also contributed articles to various magazines and blogs and Johno Ellison's account of the team's arrest in Russia, From the Grand Canyon to the Great Wall, released in 2012.
