= Djamel Agaoua =

- Djamel Agaoua in 2024
- Born: 21 September 1969 (age 57); Marseille, France
- Education: École Centrale Paris
- Occupations: Businessman; CEO

Djamel Agaoua (born 21 September 1969) is a French businessman and entrepreneur born on 21 September 1969 in Marseille, the founder or head of several companies in the digital economy, and chief executive officer (CEO) from 2017 to 2021 of the instant messaging company Viber, which belongs to the international group Rakuten.

In 2019, through an open letter addressed to Mark Zuckerberg and to the leading figures of the messaging and social media industry, he called for a system of self-regulation, with the aim of achieving higher standards of security in the confidentiality of exchanges between users and of ensuring greater protection of their personal data. In 2022, he joined the senior management of the media outlet Brut.

After serving for a few months in 2024 as managing director of the NBA Europe, he took over, in October 2024, the leadership of the Kings League, the sporting league founded by the footballer Gerard Piqué.

== Biography ==
=== Youth and education ===
Djamel Agaoua, born in Marseille in September 1969, is the son of a master pastry chef of Kabyle origin. Passionate about mathematics, he was educated in the state school system and entered the École centrale Paris, from which he graduated in 1992 as an economist-engineer . He joined his first company, the international business strategy consultancy Bain & Company, where he spent four years, before moving on to the firm Roland Berger for a further three years. He left this firm in 1999 in order to found his first companies.

=== Founding and running companies ===
Djamel Agaoua co-founded his first start-up with Alexis Renard in 2000: Achatpro, a company devoted to the general procurement needs of businesses. Following a capital increase arising from a second funding round of seven million euros and a substantial stake taken in the company's capital by BRED Banque populaire, he sold the company in 2008 to Hubwoo, the world leader in the electronic procurement (e-procurement) market in SaaS solutions, and became the group's chief financial and human resources director.

In 2006 he also took over the financial management of BProcess, an electronic invoicing solution , which was to be sold on to Ariba in 2011; thereafter he invested in, or took part in the running of, several internet companies, such as the online gaming platform Metaboli. As a business angel and vice-president of the investment fund Capital Provence Business Angels, he also invested sums, at times in a personal capacity, in various internet companies whose potential he recognised, bringing his experience and funding to start-ups such as Yoola, a travel website for people with disabilities, and Sponsorise.me, a crowdfunding site for sports sponsorship

In 2012 he invested in the executive management of the start-up Mobpartner, which offered innovative solutions in mobile advertising. The company thenceforth enjoyed rapid growth and considerable commercial success in Europe and in China. It was bought at the end of 2014, for 58 million dollars, by the Chinese mobile telephone giant Cheetah Mobile, one of the company's clients. Integrated into the new entity, he became international director of brand development. He left the company in 2016, disenchanted with his relations with the Chinese firm and with the experience as a whole.

In 2017, Djamel Agaoua was recruited as chief executive of the multi-platform messaging service Viber, which had been acquired two years earlier by the Japanese international group Rakuten, and was won over by the company's spirit and dynamism. Described by the trade press as a "serial entrepreneur", he set out the messaging service's ambitions through various media channels as soon as he took up his post ·.

In 2018, he launched new development initiatives, as well as new features intended to counter the customary practices of messaging providers, chief among them Facebook, owner of Messenger and WhatsApp. He portrayed these as intrusive, and bound up with an economic model that made no attempt to better protect users' privacy in order to increase the monetisation of the data gathered. Following the rollout in 2016 of end-to-end encryption of exchanges between users, he chose, upon its entry into force, to apply the European General Data Protection Regulation (GDPR) universally, extending it to users across the globe.

In July 2020, as CEO of Viber, he announced the severance of all commercial ties with the Facebook network and the suspension of all advertising investment on the American platform, in accordance with the #StopHateForProfit campaign, which called for an advertising boycott of the latter. He cited the mishandling of private data and the lack of respect for users' privacy across its applications, but above all the dubious decision and stance of Facebook, which had chosen to take no measures to prevent violent and dangerous rhetoric from reaching the public, nor to shield the public from it. This announcement threw into sharp relief the "Cambridge Analytica" scandal on Facebook, highlighting the platform's inability to curb the spread of hate speech in the wake of the murder of George Floyd.

After leaving Viber, he joined the senior management of Brut (media) in 2022 in order to restructure several projects. He relocated a share of the company's resources towards more profitable sectors. The Mexico bureau, devoted to the Spanish-speaking public, was closed, and the Brut America subsidiary scaled back, with job losses at both international entities. In January 2024, he took over as managing director of the NBA's Europe and Middle East division, succeeding Ralph Rivera, with the task of establishing an autonomous NBA European league. In October 2024, he was appointed chief executive of the King's League football competition, founded by Gerard Piqué, with a view to driving the worldwide development of the league's sporting events.

=== Activism ===
In January 2019, Djamel Agaoua publicly committed himself to increasing the protection of personal data by the leading players of the instant messaging industry[. He published an open letter addressed to Mark Zuckerberg and to the other heads of this sector, urging them to strengthen the security of exchanges and to raise their confidentiality to the highest possible level

In April of that same year, as pressure mounted upon the social networks concerning the privacy of the data they held, he proposed that the players of this industry take the matter into their own hands, rather than leaving it solely in the hands of the regulatory authorities, whose understanding he judged too narrow to set adequate limits. He called for meetings with a view to establishing self-regulation, and set out several measures to guarantee the confidentiality and security of exchanges between users, such as the automatic and complete encryption of conversations. In August 2019, in an interview, he pointed directly to the weakness of the messaging applications WhatsApp and Telegram, which, despite commercial claims asserting a high level of confidentiality for their users' data, had not always honoured it, or failed to implement the technological means needed to confirm their respect for such sensitive data.

Personally involved in environmental causes, Djamel Agaoua was also a member of the board and chairman of the association BLOOM from 2010 to 2016[23], an association founded by Claire Nouvian, devoted to the preservation of the seabed and of fishery resources.
