= Delaney Rudd =

American basketball player (born 1962)

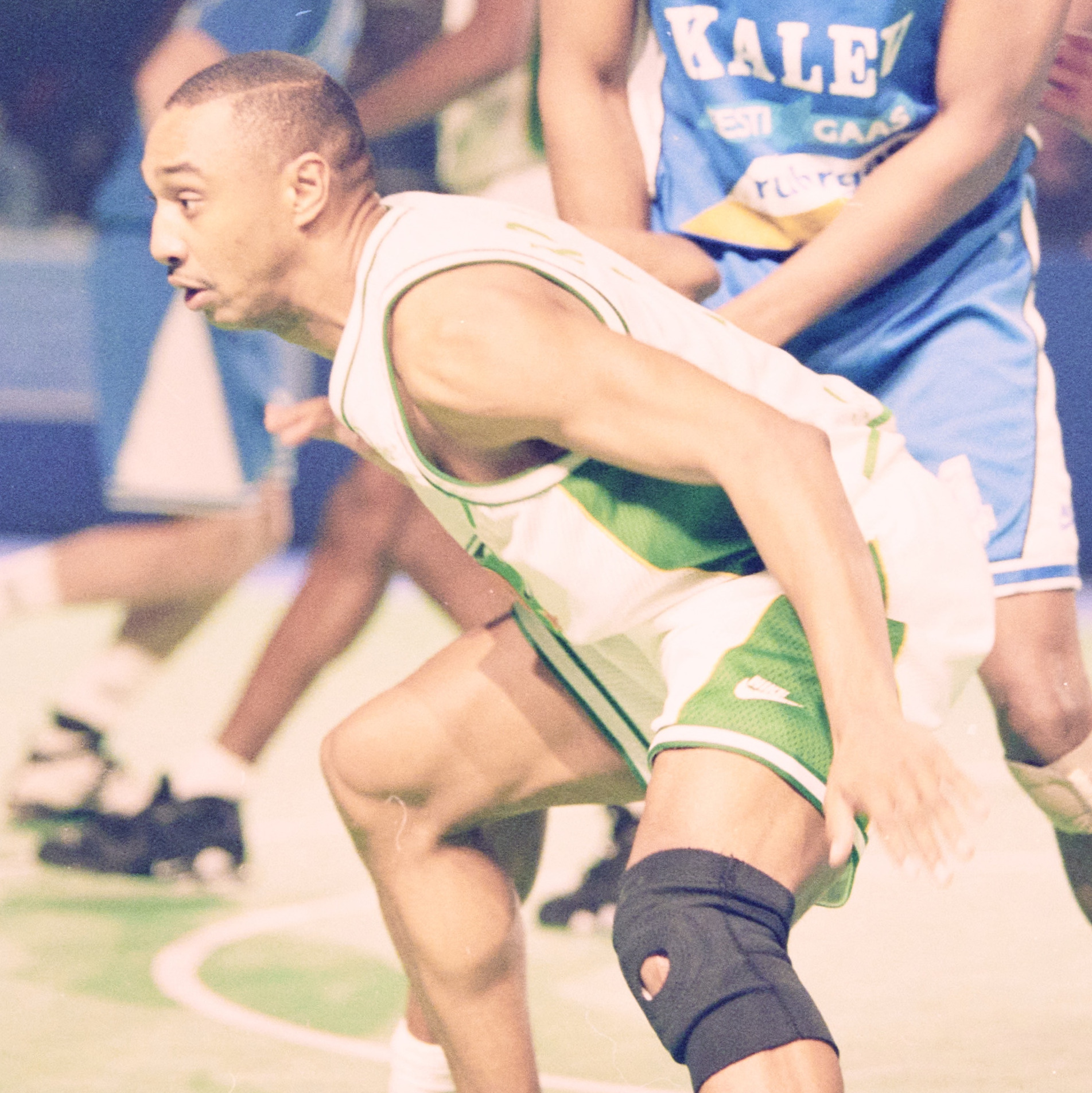
- Rudd with ASVEL Villeurbane in 1995

Personal information
- Born: November 8, 1962 (age 64) Halifax, North Carolina, U.S.
- Listed height: 6 ft 2 in (1.88 m)
- Listed weight: 180 lb (82 kg)

Career information
- High school: Eastman (Hollister, North Carolina)
- College: Wake Forest (1981–1985)
- NBA draft: 1985: 4th round, 83rd overall pick
- Drafted by: Utah Jazz
- Playing career: 1985–1999
- Position: Point guard
- Number: 4, 11

Career history
- 1985: Westchester Golden Apples
- 1985–1986: Bay State Bombardiers
- 1986: Maine Windjammers
- 1986–1988: PAOK
- 1986: Westchester Golden Apples
- 1989–1992: Utah Jazz
- 1992–1993: Rapid City Thrillers
- 1993: Portland Trail Blazers
- 1993: Paris Basket Racing
- 1993–1999: ASVEL Villeurbane

Career highlights
- FIBA EuroStar (1996); FIBA EuroStars 3 Point Contest winner (1996); 2× French Cup winner (1996, 1997); 2× French League Foreign MVP (1996, 1997); No. 4 retired by ASVEL

Career NBA statistics
- Points: 816 (3.4 ppg)
- Assists: 519 (2.2 apg)
- Steals: 74 (0.3 spg)
- Stats at NBA.com
- Stats at Basketball Reference

Edward Delaney Rudd (born November 8, 1962) is an American former professional basketball player. At a height of 6 ft 2 in (1.88 m) tall, he played at the point guard position.

== High school ==
Rudd attended and played high school basketball at Eastman High School, in Hollister, North Carolina.

== College career ==
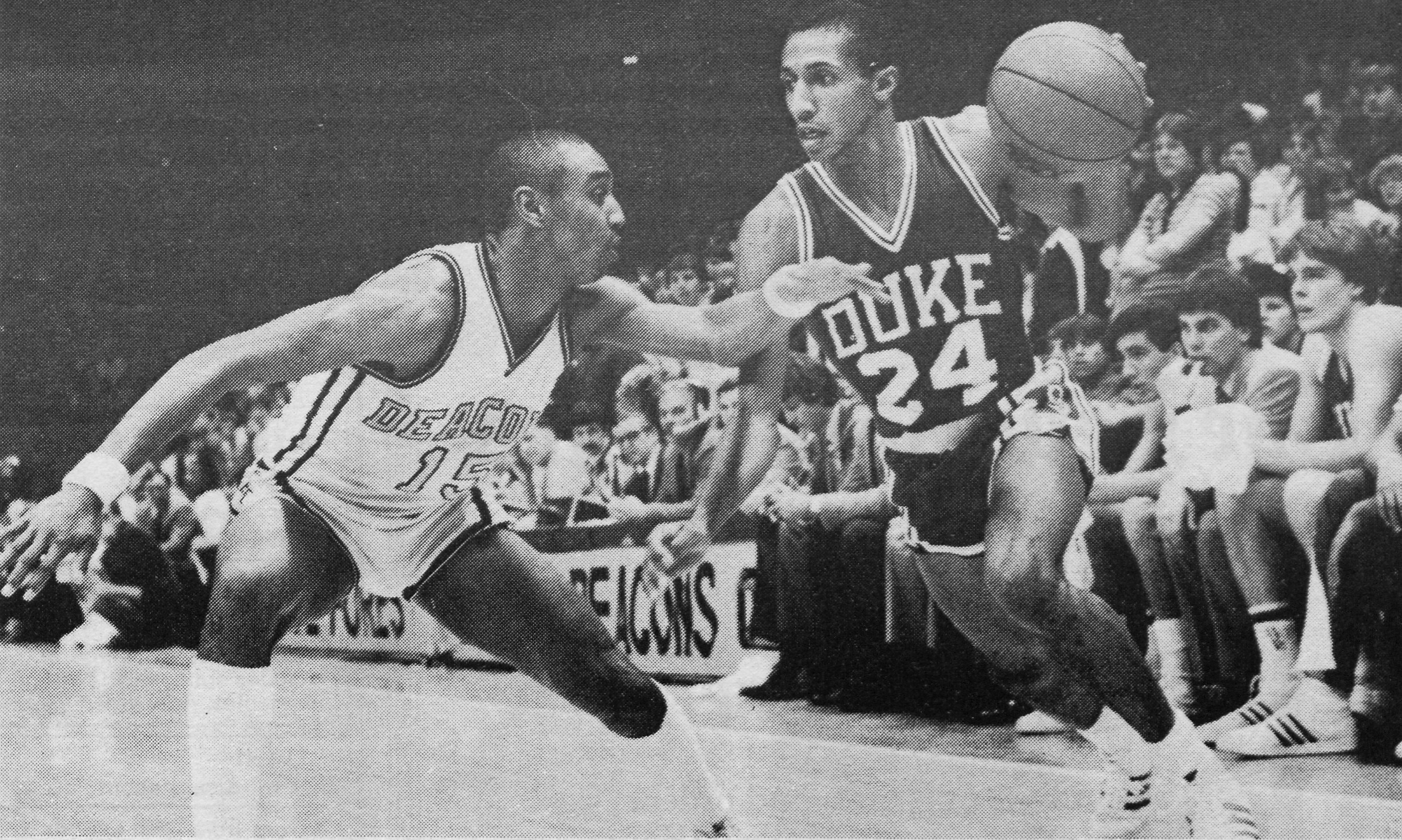
Rudd (left) with Wake Forest defending against Duke's Johnny Dawkins in 1983

After high school, Rudd attended and played college basketball Wake Forest University, with the Wake Forest Demon Deacons, from 1981 to 1985.

== Professional career ==
In his pro career, Rudd played in the Continental Basketball Association (CBA), and in the NBA with the Utah Jazz and the Portland Trail Blazers. He also played overseas, in Greece with PAOK, from 1986 to 1988, and in France, with ASVEL Lyon-Villeurbanne, from 1993 to 1999.

While playing for the Jazz, Rudd mostly served as a computer backup to future Hall of Famer John Stockton. However, Rudd had a chance to shine in the 1992 Western Conference Finals against the Blazers. In Game 5 of that series, which was tied at 2 games apiece, Stockton suffered an eye injury and thus was unable to continue playing. Rudd stepped in as point guard for the Jazz, and with his team trailing 107-104 late in the fourth quarter, swished a 23-foot 3-pointer to silence the Portland crowd and send the game into overtime.
