= ULEB =

Sports organization within basketball in Europe

European Basketball Leagues
- Abbreviation: EBBL
- Formation: June 25, 1991
- Headquarters: Barcelona, Spain
- Region served: Europe
- Members: 12 professional basketball leagues
- President: Tomas Van Den Spiegel
- Website: www.europeanbasketballleagues.eu

European Basketball Leagues (EBBL), formerly Union of European Leagues of Basketball (ULEB), is a sports organization within basketball created for growth of professional basketball in Europe. Its current members are the professional basketball leagues organisations of 11 countries: Belgium, France, Germany, Greece, Israel, Italy, Lithuania, the Netherlands, Poland, Russia, and Spain.

== History ==
=== Founding members and the All-Star Game ===
The professional basketball organizing bodies of Italy, France and Spain established the ULEB on June 25, 1991, in Rome, Italy. In November 1992, a joint All-Star weekend was held in Madrid, Spain, featuring the most outstanding players from the Spanish and Italian Leagues. The experience was repeated one year later in Rome before a crowd of 10.500 fans. In 1994, the French League joined the event and the All Star weekend moved to Valencia, Spain, with Italian, Spanish and French stars competing and showing their skills.

The ULEB has had three Presidents since its inception: Gianluigi Porelli (September 1991 to March 1998), Eduardo Portela, (March 18, 1998 to October 6, 2016) and Tomas Van Den Spiegel, elected on October 6, 2016.

The Greek league became the 4th team to join in 1996.In December 1999, the League welcomed the British, Belgian and Swiss Leagues.

=== Breakaway competition and conflict with FIBA ===
On June 9, 2000, under president Eduardo Portela, the most important clubs in Europe and the seven leagues who were members of ULEB at the time, met in Sitges, and decided to create and manage a new competition, the EuroLeague, after an ongoing disagreement with FIBA president Borislav Stankovic. Until that moment, it had been only FIBA that ran the men's top basketball clubs competition in Europe. ULEB then launched a parallel top-tier European competition under the name of Euroleague trademarking the name, and introducing lucences for clubs regarding of their domestic league finishes. FIBA instead launched Suproleague.

The first game of the new EuroLeague under the name of ULEB Euroleague , Real Madrid vs. Olympiacos, was played on October 16, 2000 in Madrid.

In October 2001, the ULEB expanded with the national leagues of Germany, Netherlands and Poland. In October 2002, the ULEB Cup, the second-tier level European club competition, was born. Its first game was played in Istanbul, on October 15, 2002, between Darüşşafaka and Novo Mesto.

=== Further expansion ===
In June 2003, the league of Lithuania joined, and in July 2005, the league was expanded with the Israeli Basketball Premier League. In 2009 ECA was created and took over the Euroleague which limited ULEB's role in the competition that has created.

In july 2014, the ULEB welcomed the Russian VTB United League, replacing its predecessor, the PBL (which had been admitted in May 2011). In 2015-17 ULEB changed sides and backed FIBA in the FIBA–EuroLeague dispute. During that period it became a major shareholder of Basketball Champions League, a new competition launched by FIBA to rival Euroleague.

The ULEB represented a total of 10 professional basketball leagues from across Europe. Other leagues such as Portugal, Adriatic, Austria, Switzerland and the Czech Republic, have also been members of the ULEB in the past, but all of them left the Union for different reasons. The Portuguese and Swiss leagues have ceased memberships, the Adriatic lost recognition from FIBA Europe, and the Austrian, British and Czech leagues voluntarily renounced their membership.

=== Name change ===
In december 2025, during the general assembly held in Brussels, the organisation renamed itself from Union of European Leagues of Basketball (ULEB) to European Basketball Leagues (EBBL). During that same meeting they also approved the admission of Basketligaen (Denmark).

EBBL is currently a shareholder of Euroleague Commercial Assets (ECA) through Euroleague Basketball SL, and is also a shareholder of Basketball Champions League SA. As written above, former Belgian player Tomas Van Den Spiegel is the current President of the EBBL, and Greek League President Vangelis Galatsopoulos is the current Vice President. The current Executive Committee of the League is completed by the leagues of Belgium, France, Germany and Spain.

== Members ==
Members of EBBL in 2025:

=== Current ===
Country	Organisation	Affiliation	Competitions
Belgium; Netherlands	BNXT League	2021	BNXT League
Denmark	Danish Basketball Association	2025	Basketligaen
France	Ligue Nationale de Basket	1991	Pro A
Finland	Korisliiga	2022	Korisliiga
Germany	Basketball Bundesliga GmbH	2001	BBL
Greece	Hellenic Basketball Association	1996	Basketball League
Israel	Israeli Basketball Premier League Administration Ltd	2005	Ligat HaAl
Italy	Lega Basket	1991	LBA
Lithuania	Lietuvos krepšinio asosiacija	2003	LKL
Poland	Polska Liga Koszykówki S.A.	2001	Basket Liga
Russia	VTB United League	2014	VTB United League
Spain	Asociación de Clubs de Baloncesto	1991	Liga ACB
Switzerland	Swiss Basketball League	2022	SBL Men

=== Former ===
Former EBBL members:

Country	Organiser	Affiliation years	Reasons of surrender
Austria	Basketball Austria	2002-2015	withdrew
Bosnia and Herzegovina; Croatia; North Macedonia; Montenegro; Serbia; Slovenia	Adriatic Basketball Association	2002-2015	lost recognition from FIBA Europe
Belgium	Pro Basketball League	1999-2021	replaced by BNXT League
Czech Republic	National Basketball League (Czech Republic)	2004-2016	withdrew
Netherlands	Dutch Basketball League	1999-2021	replaced by BNXT League
Portugal	Liga Portuguesa de Basquetebol	1996-2008	ceased membership
Russia	Russian Professional Basketball League	2011-2013	replace by VTB United League
United Kingdom	British Basketball League	1999-2016	withdrew
Switzerland	Ligue Nationale de Basket Amateur	1999-2016	ceased membership in 2016 and replaced in 2022 by Swiss Basketball League

== Presidents ==
- (Italy) Gianluigi Porelli 1991-1998
- (Spain) Eduardo Portela 1998-2016
- (Belgium) Thomas Van Den Spiegel 2016-

== See also ==
- ULEB All-Star Game
- FIBA–EuroLeague dispute
- European professional club basketball system
- Historical European national basketball league rankings
- European Leagues
