= Gianluigi Porelli =

Italian basketball executive

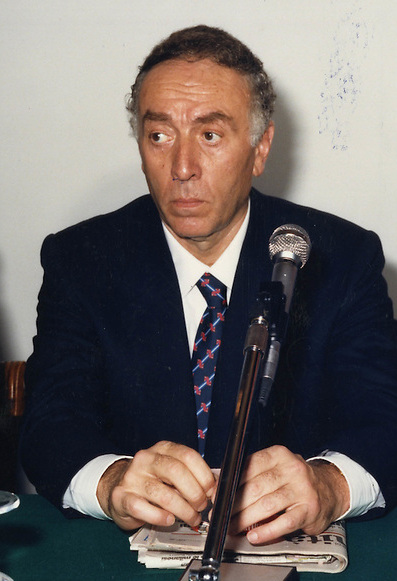

Personal information
- Born: June 10, 1930 Mantua, Kingdom of Italy
- Died: September 4, 2009 (aged 79) Bologna, Italy
- Position: President

Career history
- 1968–1991: Virtus Bologna

Career highlights
- Cup Winners' Cup champion (1990); 4x Italian League champion (1976, 1979, 1980, 1984); 4x Italian Cup winner (1974, 1984, 1989, 1990)

Gianluigi "Gigi" Porelli (10 June 1930 – 4 September 2009) was an Italian basketball executive, who served as president of Virtus Bologna from 1968 until 1991. Porelli has been widely regarded as one of the greatest contributors to the growth and development of basketball in Italy and Europe. In 2007, he was inducted into the Italian Basketball Hall of Fame.

== Early life ==
Gianluigi Porelli was born in Mantua in 1930. In his youth he practiced swimming, boxing and, above all, tennis, in which he achieved good results, reaching the third category. Arrived in Bologna in 1949 to attend the Faculty of Law at the University of Bologna, he joined Virtus Tennis, a branch of SEF Virtus Bologna, first as a player and later as a manager.

== Basketball management career ==
=== Beginnings ===
In 1968, the lawyer Gianluigi Porelli was appointed by the then president of the multi-sport club, Giovanni Elkan, at the head of the basketball section of SEF Virtus Bologna. Alternately nicknamed "Torquemada" or "Robespierre" for his quick and often dictatorial methods, or, more frequently, L'Avvocato ("The Lawyer"), Porelli has been one of the most prominent figures in the history of Virtus which, through initiatives often unpopular but almost always winning, definitively carried towards professionalism. As soon as he arrived, at only 38 years old, Porelli sacked coach Šíp and appointed Renzo Ranuzzi, a former player. However, Ranuzzi lasted one year only, due to the poor result of the team, which ended the season at the 10th place. After another poor result in the 1969–70 season under coach Nello Paratore, in 1970, Porelli hired Black V's legendary coach Vittorio Tracuzzi and sold the best player of the time, Gianfranco Lombardi, unleashing a popular uprising that even ended up in court. Despite Tracuzzi's comeback, the team placed 10th once again. In 1970, thanks to Porelli, Virtus was also one of the main proponents and founders of the Lega Basket, the governing body of the top-tier level professional Italian basketball league. In the same year, Virtus broke away from the multi sports club, becoming a joint-stock company. Thanks to this choice, which was highly criticised at the time, Porelli definitively healed the club's finances. In 1971, Porelli hired the American player John Fultz who, supported by important Italian players like Gianni Bertolotti and Luigi Serafini, succeeded in placing the team 5th in the national championship, the best result since 1967–68. In the following season, the team, composed by the same players and coached by Nico Messina, arrived 6th.

=== A season of triumphs ===
In 1973, Porelli opened a new season of triumphs, thanks to a partnership with Sinudyne, a famous Italian domestic appliances company, and especially with the engagement of the young American coach Dan Peterson, coming from the Chile's national basketball team. Virtus immediately won its first Italian Cup in 1973–74 season, which was club's first title since 1955–56. In the following season, Virtus signed Tom McMillen, a 22-years-old player from the University of Maryland, who was selected with the 9th overall pick by the Buffalo Braves during the 1974 NBA draft. He signed with the Braves but postponed his entry into the NBA to attend the University of Oxford as a Rhodes Scholar. McMillen lived and studied in the UK, but he moved to Bologna during the weekends to play basketball. At the end of the season, characterized by outstanding performances by McMillen, the team placed 4th in the national championship and was eliminated at the quarterfinals of the European Cup Winners' Cup.

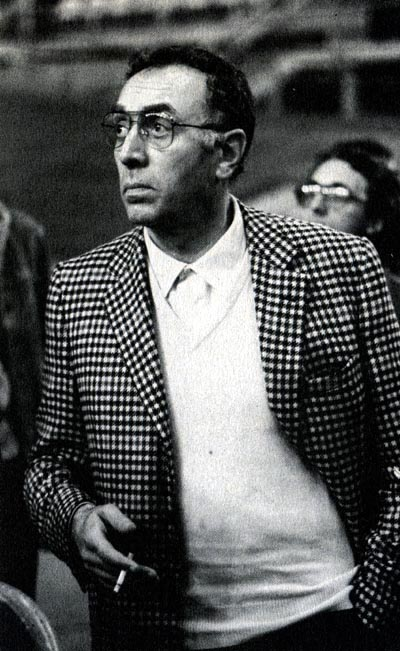
Porelli during the 1980s

In 1975, McMillen started his career in the NBA, so Porelli and Peterson signed Terry Driscoll, a former NBA player and 4th overall pick in 1969 draft. Thanks to Driscoll's leadership and the fundamental support of Italian players like Carlo Caglieris, Gianni Bertolotti, Marco Bonamico and Luigi Serafini, Virtus won its seventh national championship, the first one after twenty years. In 1976–77, Virtus ended first in the regular season, however it lost the championship finals against Varese, by 2–0. In the following season, the Black V succeeded in reaching the national finals, but nonetheless it lost 2–1 against Varese again. The team also reached the final of the Cup Winner's Cup, but lost 84–82 against Gabetti Cantù. In 1978, after two consecutive second places, coach Peterson left the Black V to sign with Virtus historic rival, Olimpia Milan. This move was heavily criticised by Black V's fans, but it was approved by Porelli himself. However, despite the controversies which rose around his farewell, Peterson's legacy was huge: the American coach deeply changed the team's organization and contributed in bringing back Virtus to the top of Italian basketball after twenty years of struggles.

After Peterson's departure, Terry Driscoll was appointed new head coach. Porelli signed also Krešimir Ćosić, one of the best centers in Europe; the team was also composed by great Italian players as Renato Villalta, Carlo Caglieris and the captain Gianni Bertolotti. In the national finals, Virtus faced its former coach, Dan Peterson and his new team, Olimpia. Despite the great expectations around a hard-fought final, the Black V easily won the title in only two games. The team also reached the semi-finals of the Cup Winners' Cup, where it was eliminated for only one point by the Dutch EBBC. In the following season, Porelli signed Jim McMillian, a 1972 NBA champion with the Los Angeles Lakers. McMillian, who was immediately nicknamed by Virtus fans as Il Duca Nero ("The Black Duke"), led the team achieving a back-to-back, winning its ninth titles against Cantù. The team took part also in the European Champions Cup, where it was eliminated in the semi-finals group stage. At the end of the season, Driscoll’s two year contract had expired. Porelli and Driscoll could not agree on a contract. Despite Driscoll’s great successes, first as player, one championship, and two championships as a coach in five years, when no agreement was reached, Driscoll chose to return to retire from basketball.

At the beginning of the 1980–81 season, Driscoll's assistant, Ettore Zuccheri, became the new head coach, but he was later replaced by Renzo Ranuzzi. The team reached once again the national finals, but it slightly lost the playoff series by 2–1 against Cantù. Returning to the top in Italy, the Black V attempted to become a major team in Europe too, and in 1981, Virtus reached the final of the FIBA European Champions Cup in Strasbourg. However, a few days before the final, McMillian suffered a serious injury against Brindisi and was forced not to play in the final, which then Virtus lost by only one point against Maccabi Tel Aviv, after a very contested game and dubious referees' choices.

After the defeat in the Cup, Porelli sacked Ranuzzi and hired coach Aleksandar Nikolić, worldwide known as "The Professor". The team was composed also by young and talented Italian players like Roberto Brunamonti and Augusto Binelli, as well as important foreign players, like the Bahamian center Elvis Rolle. Despite his fame, Nikolić did not succeed in bringing Virtus back to title, so in 1983, after the brief experiences of George Bisacca and Mauro Di Vincenzo, the 35 years-old Alberto Bucci, from Bologna, became the new head coach. In the same years, the club signed a deal with Granarolo, a milk and dairy production company, which became the new team's sponsor. Virtus ended the regular season second, after Peterson's Olimpia. The two teams faced themselves in a historic final, always remembered as one of the best in Italian basketball history, in which Virtus defeated Olimpia by 2–1, reaching its 10th national title, also known as La Stella ("The Star"), due to the star which is attributed to teams that manage to win ten national championships. In the same year, the team completed a domestic double by adding a National Cup. In 1984–85, Virtus reached the semi-final group stage of the Champions Cup, where, however, it was eliminated. After a defeat in the playoffs' quarterfinals against Olimpia, Bucci was sacked and Sandro Gamba became the new coach. Gamba, one of the most successful Italian coaches of all time, did not succeed in winning with Virtus too, exiting in the first round of 1986 playoffs and being eliminated in the quarterfinals of 1987 playoffs. In 1988, Krešimir Ćosić, a former Virtus star, replaced Gamba. Despite the head coach's change, the team continued collecting poor successes, being ousted in the Korać Cup's quarterfinals and in the first round of national playoffs.

=== The "Sugar-mania" ===
In 1988, Porelli hired Bob Hill, who was New York Knicks' head coach until the previous season. Hill brought in Italy two former NBA players: Micheal Ray Richardson, an NBA All-Star and former player for the Knicks and New Jersey Nets, who was banned from the NBA for violations of league's drug policy, and Clemon Johnson, 1983 NBA champion with the Philadelphia 76ers, who also played for the Indiana Pacers and Seattle SuperSonics. At the beginning of the season, Porelli reached an agreement with Knorr, a German food and beverage brand, which became the team's sponsor. In 1988–89 Virtus won its third Italian Cup, but it was defeated in the semi-finals for the national championship against Enichem Livorno, coached by Bucci. Despite the playoffs' elimination, the season was considered a rebirth for Virtus: the national cup was the team's first trophy since 1984 and the great performances of Richardson had brought back the passion for basketball in the city. This period became known as "Sugar-mania", from Richardson's historic nickname. In the following summer, Hill surprisingly resigned from his post and his assistant, the 30 years-old Ettore Messina, was appointed new head coach. The Black V won the Italian Cup again and on 13 March 1990, won its first European title, the FIBA European Cup Winners' Cup, the second-tier level European-wide competition, defeating 79–74 the Real Madrid coached by George Karl. The final was characterized by an outstanding performance of Richardson, able of scoring 29 points. However, the team was once again eliminated in national playoffs' quarterfinals against Phonola Caserta. In 1990–91, Virtus placed third in the regular season but it was once again eliminated in the national semi-finals by Caserta. At the end of the season, Richardson was not confirmed and signed for Slobodna Dalmacija, putting an end to a three-year period in which he brought Virtus to win its first European trophy and laid the foundations for club's successes in the following years.

=== Last years and retirement ===
In 1991, after two years of internal struggles within the shareholders' assembly, during which he also briefly lost the control of the club, Porelli sold Virtus to Alfredo Cazzola, a local trade fair entrepreneur. During 23 years of tenure, Porelli won four national titles, four Italian Cups and one Cup Winner's Cup, transforming a simple basketball section of a multisport club into one of the richest and most successful teams in Europe.

In 1991, Porelli was also one of the founders of ULEB, the Union of European Leagues of Basketball, along with Eduardo Portela. He also served as ULEB's first President, from 1991 to 1998. He was also the honorary president of ULEB.

== Legacy ==
Porelli was widely regarded as one of the greatest innovators in Italian and European basketball. In 2014, the Euroleague Basketball Company, which organizes the top-tier European-wide professional club basketball competition (the EuroLeague), named its Executive of the Year Award after Porelli, in his honor.
