= Conrad McRae =

American basketball player (1971-2000)

Personal information
- Born: January 11, 1971 New York City, New York, U.S.
- Died: July 10, 2000 (aged 29) Irvine, California, U.S.
- Listed height: 6 ft 10 in (2.08 m)
- Listed weight: 222 lb (101 kg)

Career information
- High school: Brooklyn Technical (Brooklyn, New York)
- College: Syracuse (1989–1993)
- NBA draft: 1993: 2nd round, 38th overall pick
- Drafted by: Washington Bullets
- Playing career: 1993–2000
- Position: Power forward / center

Career history
- 1993–1994: Fenerbahçe
- 1994: Fort Wayne Fury
- 1994–1995: Élan Béarnais Pau-Orthez
- 1995–1996: Efes Pilsen
- 1996–1997: Teamsystem Bologna
- 1997–1998: PAOK
- 1998–1999: Fenerbahçe
- 1999–2000: Telit Trieste

Career highlights
- 2× FIBA EuroStar (1996, 1998); FIBA Korać Cup champion (1996); Turkish League champion (1996); Turkish Cup winner (1996); McDonald's All-American (1989); 2× Third-team Parade All-American (1988, 1989)
- Stats at Basketball Reference
Medals
Men's basketball
Representing United States
FIBA Americas U18 Championship
Gold medal – first place	1990 Montevideo	Team competition

Conrad Bastien McRae (January 11, 1971 – July 10, 2000) was an American professional basketball player who had a successful career in Europe, for teams in France, Italy, Greece and Turkey. He was also selected by the Washington Bullets, in the second round (38th pick overall) of the 1993 NBA draft.

== High school ==
McRae attended Brooklyn Technical High School, where he excelled at basketball. He earned the nickname "McNasty", while playing in the Entertainers Basketball Classic in Harlem's Rucker Park. In high school, McRae was named PSAL High School All-City from 1986 to 1989, selected to the 1989 McDonald's All-American Team, and participated in the Junior Olympics.

== College career ==
McRae accepted a scholarship to Syracuse University, where he would play college basketball under head coach Jim Boeheim, with the Syracuse Orange. Though he did not immediately garner many minutes of playing time, his tenacity, athleticism, and defensive skills turned him into a second round NBA draft pick in 1993, by the Washington Bullets. While he was at Syracuse, McRae became a member of Phi Beta Sigma fraternity (Theta Xi Chapter).

== Professional career ==
McRae moved on to play in Europe, eventually starring on several European clubs in Turkey, France, Italy and Greece. He helped Efes of Istanbul to win the FIBA Korać Cup of 1995–96, and also reached the Italian League's championship finals in the 1996–97 season, with Fortitudo Bologna. While in Europe, he accidentally scored in the wrong basket, after getting a poor night's sleep in his Parisian hotel room, due to what were described as "water problems." Though McRae never played in the NBA, he did play on home soil for the Fort Wayne Fury of the CBA, in 1994. In eight games played with the Fury, McRae averaged 8.6 points and 7.5 points per game.

In 1999, McRae signed a 10-day contract with the Denver Nuggets, but it was terminated after he fainted before a game.

== Death ==
In the summer of 2000, McRae collapsed and died while running wind sprints during an Orlando Magic summer league practice at the University of California, Irvine. An autopsy failed to determine the cause of death, but McRae had a history of arrhythmia. McRae was to be married August 5, 26 days from his passing.

== See also ==
- List of basketball players who died during their careers
