= FIBA EuroStars =

Euro All-Sar competition

- Frequency: Annual
- Years active: 1996–2001, 2007
- Participants: Eastern and Western All-Stars
- Organizer: FIBA

FIBA EuroStars was an annual All-Star Game showcase of the sport of European professional club basketball. It was organized by FIBA Europe. Commonly considered to be the European equivalent of the NBA All-Star Game, the FIBA EuroStars Game featured the season's best players, from both the European-wide top-tier level EuroLeague, and the European-wide 2nd-tier level FIBA Saporta Cup competitions. Diversity was considered to be paramount in the selection process, which aimed at allowing several different European national basketball leagues to be represented in the game.

When the first FIBA EuroStars event was held in 1996, it replaced FIBA's original all-star game event, which was called the FIBA Festival. The FIBA Festival had taken place on-and-off, from 1964 to 1998. FIBA EuroStars was held from the 1996–97 season, through the 1999–00 season, before it was discontinued, due to the FIBA–EuroLeague dispute. In 2007, the event was briefly brought back, under a different format, for one final edition.

== History ==
The FIBA EuroStars all-star event was initially held at the very end of the calendar year, during the middle of the current club season, and it initially lasted as an event for four seasons. The FIBA EuroStar events were patterned after the design of the NBA All-Star Game – a match between the East and West geographically. Also like the NBA All-Star Event, the FIBA EuroStars Event a featured a 3-point shootout contest. Players that competed in one of the European national pro club leagues located on the east side of Europe (GBL, TBSL, YUBA, RBSL, IBPL, etc.) were eligible for selection to the East Team, regardless of their individual countries of origin. On the other hand, players that competed in European national pro club leagues on the west side of Europe (ACB, LEGA A, Pro A, BBL, LKL, etc.), were eligible for selection to the West Team. The Eastern Stars defeated their Western opponents on all four editions of the all-star game, under that original format.

In 2007, FIBA Europe brought back the FIBA EuroStar Game, but with a new format. The revised version of the all-star game kept the FIBA EuroStar name. Under the revised format, the then-current champions of the FIBA EuroBasket, would play against an All-Star FIBA European Selection Team, composed of players from various different European national teams. Also, under the revised format, there would no longer be a 3-Point Contest. FIBA rebranded the All-Star Event as the 1st edition of the tournament, under the new format. While it counted the newly revised EuroStar Game as being a part of the original FIBA EuroStar games, that were held from 1996 to 1999.

At the 2007 FIBA EuroStars Game, FIBA also honored some of the FIBA EuroStars of the past. Sergei Belov, Antonello Riva, Doron Jamchi, Dejan Bodiroga, Vladimir Tkachenko, and Vlade Divac. were selected to the FIBA All-Time EuroStars Team. Theo Papaloukas was also given the 2006 FIBA Europe Player of the Year award, prior to the start of the 2007 all-star game. Originally, FIBA Europe intended for the event to continue to take place every two years, after the new champions of each subsequent FIBA EuroBasket were crowned. Ultimately however, the 2007 game was the last edition of the FIBA EuroStar Game to date.

== Results ==
Bold: Indicates the team that won the game.

Year (Season)	Date	Arena	Team	Score	Team	MVP	Top Scorer
1996 (1996–97)	December 30	(Turkey) Abdi İpekçi, Istanbul	**East**	**117**–114	West	(United States) David Rivers	(Federal Republic of Yugoslavia) Zoran Savić
1997 (1997–98)	December 30	(Israel) Yad Eliyahu, Tel Aviv	**East**	**129**–107	West	(Lithuania) Artūras Karnišovas	(Federal Republic of Yugoslavia) Sašha Đjorđjević
1998 (1998–99)	December 29	(Germany) Max Schmeling, Berlin	**East**	**104**–98	West	(Italy) Carlton Myers	(Italy) Carlton Myers
1999 (1999–00)	December 28	(Russia) Olimpiisky, Moscow	**East**	**112**–107	West	(United States) Tyus Edney	(Lithuania) Artūras Karnišovas
2000 (2000–01)	December 27	(Greece) OAKA, Athens	Cancelled due to the FIBA–EuroLeague dispute				
2007 (2006–07)	June 30	(Greece) OAKA, Athens	**Greek NT**	**101**–90	European Selection	N/A	(Greece) Antonis Fotsis

== Three-Point Shootout Contest ==
Year (Season)	Winner	Team	Runner-up	Team
1996 (1996–97)	(United States) Delaney Rudd	(France) ASVEL	(Russia) Vasily Karasev	(Turkey) Efes Pilsen
1997 (1997–98)	(Federal Republic of Yugoslavia) Sašha Đjorđjević	(Spain) FC Barcelona Banca Catalana	(Israel) Guy Goodes	(Italy) Caserta
1998 (1998–99)	(Italy) Carlton Myers	(Italy) Teamsyatem Bologna	(North Macedonia) Petar Naumoski	(Turkey) Efes Pilsen
1999 (1999–00)	(Turkey) İbrahim Kutluay	(Turkey) Fenerbahçe	(United States) Tyus Edney	(Italy) Benetton Treviso
2000 (2000–01)	Cancelled due to the FIBA–EuroLeague dispute			
2007 (2006–07)	Not held			

== Score sheets ==
=== 1996 FIBA EuroStars - Istanbul, Turkey (1996–97 season) ===
Source: fiba.basketball

Arena: Abdi İpekçi, Istanbul, att: (14,000)

Date: December 30, 1996

Season: 1996–97

Score: East 117 – West 114

**EAST** (Head Coach: (Federal Republic of Yugoslavia) Dušan Ivković):

- (United States) David Rivers
  (31, Point Guard 1.88 m, (Greece) Olympiacos)
- (Greece) Panos Fasoulas
  (33, Center 2.13 m, (Greece) Olympiacos)
- (North Macedonia) Petar Naumoski
  (28, Point Guard 1.95 m, (Turkey) Efes Pilsen)
- (Greece) Nikos Oikonomou
  (23, Power Forward 2.08 m, (Greece) Panathinaikos)
- (Russia) Sergei Bazarevich
  (31, Point Guard 1.91 m, (Russia) CSKA Moscow)
- (Slovenia) Jure Zdovc
  (30, Shooiting Guard 1.95 m)
- (Turkey) İbrahim Kutluay
  (22, Shooting Guard 1.98 m, (Turkey) Fenerbahçe)
- (Federal Republic of Yugoslavia) Peja Drobnjak
  (21, Power forward/center 2.11 m, (Federal Republic of Yugoslavia) Partizan)
- (United States) Randy White
  (29, Power Forward 2.03 m, (Israel) Maccabi Tel Aviv)
- (Russia) Evgeni Kisurin
  (27, Power Forward 2.07 m, (Croatia) Cibona)
- (Turkey) Orhun Ene
  (29, Point Guard 1.88 m, (Turkey) Ülker)

**WEST** (Head Coach: (Spain) Lolo Sainz):

- (Federal Republic of Yugoslavia) Zoran Savić
  (30, Power forward/center 2.08 m, (Italy) Kinder Bologna)
- (Italy) Carlton Myers
  (25, Shooting Guard 1.92 m, (Italy) Teamsystem Bologna)
- (Federal Republic of Yugoslavia) Željko Rebrača
  (24, Center 2.13 m, (Italy) Benetton Treviso)
- (United States) Conrad McRae
  (25, Power forward/center 2.11 m, (Italy) Teamsystem Bologna)
- (Italy) Walter Magnifico
  (35, Center 2.09 m, (Italy) Kinder Bologna)
- (Federal Republic of Yugoslavia) Sašha Obradović
  (27, Point Guard 1.97 m, (Germany) Alba Berlin)
- (Slovenia) Marko Milič
  (19, Forward 2.01 m, (Slovenia) Union Olimpija)
- (United States) Delaney Rudd
  (34, Point Guard 1.88 m, (France) ASVEL)
- (France) Yann Bonato
  (24, Small Forward 2.02 m, (France) Limoges)
- (Germany) Henning Harnisch
  (28, Forward 2.03 m, (Germany) Alba Berlin)
- (Belgium) Ronny Bayer
  (30, Point Guard 1.86 m, (Belgium) Sunair Oostende)

Game MVP (Crystal Player Award): (United States) David Rivers

3 Point Contest winner: (United States) Delaney Rudd (defeated (Russia) Vasily Karasev in the final).
Other conestants invited officially by FIBA Europe were: Antoine Rigaudeau, and Carlton Myers. Harun Erdenay was invited by hosts Ülker.

Top scorers: (United States) David Rivers (19 pts), (North Macedonia) Petar Naumoski (16 pts), (United States) Randy White (12 pts), (Turkey) İbrahim Kutluay (9 pts), (Turkey) Orhun Ene (0 pts), (Russia) Evgeni Kisurin (7 pts), (Federal Republic of Yugoslavia) Peja Drobnjak (4 pts), (Slovenia) Jure Zdovc (13 pts), (Russia) Sergei Bazarevich (6 pts), (Greece) Nikos Oikonomou (25 pts), (Greece) Panos Fasoulas (6 pts) - (Federal Republic of Yugoslavia) Zoran Savić (30 points), (Germany) Henning Harnisch (7 pts), (Slovenia) Marko Milič (8 pts), (France) Yann Bonato (10 pts), (Belgium) Ronny Bayer (1 pt), (United States) Delaney Rudd (4 pts), (Federal Republic of Yugoslavia) Sašha Obradović (15 pts), (Italy) Walter Magnifico (8 pts), (Federal Republic of Yugoslavia) Željko Rebrača (7 pts), (United States) Conrad McRae (12 pts), (Italy) Carlton Myers (12 pts)

( (France) Richard Dacoury, (Federal Republic of Yugoslavia) Dragan Tarlać, (France) Antoine Rigaudeau and (Greece) Georgios Sigalas were selected, but they didn't play in the game.)

=== 1997 FIBA EuroStars - Tel Aviv, Israel (1997–98 season) ===
Source: fiba.basketball

Arena: Yad Eliyahu, Tel Aviv

Date: December 30, 1997

Season: 1997–98

Score: East 129 – West 107

EAST:

- (Croatia) Dino Rađja
- (United States) Byron Scott
- (Lithuania) Artūras Karnišovas
- (North Macedonia) Petar Naumoski
- (Russia) Sergei Bazarevich
- (Israel) Oded Kattash
- (Croatia) Damir Mulaomerović
- (United States) Rashard Griffith
- (Greece) Nikos Oikonomou
- (Federal Republic of Yugoslavia) Peja Drobnjak
- (Lithuania) Gintaras Einikis
- (Israel) Nadav Henefeld
- Head Coach: (Federal Republic of Yugoslavia) Dušan Ivković

WEST:

- (Federal Republic of Yugoslavia) Sasha Danilović
- (United States) David Rivers
- (France) Antoine Rigaudeau
- (Federal Republic of Yugoslavia) Zoran Savić
- (Federal Republic of Yugoslavia) Sašha Đjorđjević
- (Italy) Gregor Fučka
- (Federal Republic of Yugoslavia) Željko Rebrača
- (Russia) Vasily Karasev
- (United States) Wendell Alexis
- (Spain) Alberto Herreros
- (Georgia (country)) Vladimir Stepania
- Head Coach: (Italy) Ettore Messina

Game MVP (Crystal Player Award): (Lithuania) Artūras Karnišovas

3 Point Contest winner: (Federal Republic of Yugoslavia) Sašha Đjorđjević (defeated (Israel) Guy Goodes in the final).
Other conestants invited officially by FIBA Europe were: Antoine Rigaudeau, and Arturas Karnisovas. Guy Goodes was invited by hosts Maccabi Tel-Aviv.

Top scorers: (Federal Republic of Yugoslavia) Sašha Đjorđjević (23 points) (Federal Republic of Yugoslavia) Vladimir Stepania (18 pts), (United States) Rashard Griffith (13 pts), (Greece) Nikos Oikonomou (13 pts), (Israel) Oded Kattash (9 pts), (Israel) Nadav Henefeld (8 pts), (Croatia) Damir Mulaomerović (8 pts), (North Macedonia) Petar Naumoski (5 pts), (Lithuania) Gintaras Einikis (4 pts), (Russia) Sergei Bazarevich (1 pt) - (Lithuania) Artūras Karnišovas (19 points), (United States) Byron Scott (18 points), (Federal Republic of Yugoslavia) Predrag Drobnjak (18 points), (Federal Republic of Yugoslavia) Sasha Danilović (13 pts), (United States) Wendell Alexis (11 pts), (Croatia) Dino Rađja (13 pts), (Federal Republic of Yugoslavia) Željko Rebrača (9 pts), (Georgia (country)) Vladimir Stepania (18 pts), (Spain) Alberto Herreros (5 pts), (Russia) Vasily Karasev (2 pts), (France) Antoine Rigaudeau (11 pts), (Federal Republic of Yugoslavia) Zoran Savić (7 pts), (United States) David Rivers (6 pts), (Italy) Gregor Fučka (2 pts)

( (Federal Republic of Yugoslavia) Dejan Bodiroga was selected, but he didn't play in the game.)

=== 1998 FIBA EuroStars - Berlin, Germany (1998–99 season) ===
Source:fiba.basketball

Arena: Max Schmeling, Berlin

Date: December 29, 1998

Season: 1998–99

Score: East 104 – West 98

EAST:

- (Federal Republic of Yugoslavia) Dejan Bodiroga
- (Croatia) Dino Rađja
- (United States) David Rivers
- (North Macedonia) Petar Naumoski
- (Israel) Doron Sheffer
- (United States) Conrad McRae
- (Turkey) İbrahim Kutluay
- (Slovenia) Marko Milič
- (Greece) Nikos Oikonomou
- (Federal Republic of Yugoslavia) Dragan Tarlać
- (Lithuania) Saulius Štombergas
- (Russia) Vasily Karasev
- Head Coach: (Russia) Stanislav Yeryomin

WEST:

- (Federal Republic of Yugoslavia) Sasha Danilović
- (Lithuania) Artūras Karnišovas
- (France) Antoine Rigaudeau
- (Federal Republic of Yugoslavia) Željko Rebrača
- (Italy) Carlton Myers
- (Slovenia) Rašho Nesterović
- (United States) Wendell Alexis
- (Spain) Alberto Herreros
- (Italy) Andrea Meneghin
- (Germany) Henrik Rödl
- (Belgium) Éric Struelens
- Head Coach: (Federal Republic of Yugoslavia) Svetislav Pešić

Game MVP (Crystal Player Award): (Italy) Carlton Myers

3 Point Contest winner: (Italy) Carlton Myers (defeated (North Macedonia) Petar Naumoski in the final)

Top scorers: (Croatia) Dino Rađja (17 pts), (North Macedonia) Petar Naumoski (13 pts), (Turkey) İbrahim Kutluay (13 pts), (Federal Republic of Yugoslavia) Dejan Bodiroga (15 pts), (Federal Republic of Yugoslavia) Dragan Tarlać (12 pts) (Slovenia) Marko Milič (3 pts), (United States) Conrad McRae (4 pts), (Lithuania) Saulius Štombergas (11 pts), (United States) David Rivers (12 pts), (Greece) Nikos Oikonomou (0 pts), (Russia) Vasily Karasev (4 pts) - (Italy) Carlton Myers (20 points), (Federal Republic of Yugoslavia) Sasha Danilović (19 points), (Lithuania) Artūras Karnišovas (14 pts), (Italy) Andrea Meneghin (3 pts), (Spain) Alberto Herreros (2 pts), (Federal Republic of Yugoslavia) Željko Rebrača (14 pts), (Belgium) Éric Struelens (4 pts), (Germany) Henrik Rödl (4 pts), (United States) Wendell Alexis (12 pts), (Slovenia) Rašho Nesterović (2 pts), (France) Antoine Rigaudeau (4 pts),

( (United States) Tanoka Beard and (Israel) Doron Sheffer were selected, but didn't play in the game.)

=== 1999 FIBA EuroStars - Moscow, Russia (1999–00 season) ===
Source:fiba.basketball

Arena: Olimpiisky, Moscow

Date: December 28, 1999

Season: 1999–2000

Score: East 112 – West 107

EAST:

- (United States) David Rivers
- (Federal Republic of Yugoslavia) Dejan Bodiroga
- (Russia) Andrei Kirilenko
- (Turkey) İbrahim Kutluay
- (Israel) Oded Kattash
- (United States) Anthony Bowie
- (Federal Republic of Yugoslavia) Dragan Tarlać
- (Czech Republic) Jiří Zídek Jr.
- (Russia) Vasily Karasev
- (Russia) Igor Kudelin
- Head Coach: (Russia) Alexander Gomelsky

WEST:

- (United States) Tyus Edney
- (Lithuania) Artūras Karnišovas
- (Croatia) Stojko Vranković
- (Italy) Gregor Fučka
- (Greece) Nikos Oikonomou
- (Slovenia) Marko Milič
- (France) Jim Bilba
- (Italy) Andrea Meneghin
- (United States) Tanoka Beard
- (Italy) Alessandro Abbio
- Head Coach: (Italy) Carlo Recalcati

Game MVP: (United States) Tyus Edney

3 Point Contest winner: (Turkey) İbrahim Kutluay (defeated (United States) Tyus Edney in the final)

Top scorers: (Russia) Vasily Karasev (20 points), (Federal Republic of Yugoslavia) Dragan Tarlać (18 points), (Federal Republic of Yugoslavia) Dejan Bodiroga (18 points), (Israel) Oded Kattash (16 points), (Russia) Andrei Kirilenko (10 points), (Czech Republic) Jiří Zídek Jr. (10 points), (Russia) Igor Kudelin (9 points), (United States) David Rivers (5 points), (United States) Anthony Bowie (0 pts), (Turkey) İbrahim Kutluay (6 pts) - (Lithuania) Artūras Karnišovas (29 points), (United States) Tyus Edney (19 points), (United States) Tanoka Beard (13 points), (Greece) Nikos Oikonomou (9 points), (Slovenia) Marko Milič (6 pts), (Italy) Alessandro Abbio (5 pts), (United States) Tanoka Beard (13 points), (France) Jim Bilba (4 points), (Italy) Gregor Fučka (9 points), (Croatia) Stojko Vranković (6 points), (Italy) Andrea Meneghin (7 points)

( (Federal Republic of Yugoslavia) Željko Rebrača, (Croatia) Dino Rađja, (Italy) Carlton Myers, and (France) Antoine Rigaudeau were selected, but they didn't play in the game.)

=== 2000 FIBA EuroStars - Athens, Greece (2000–01 season) ===
Arena: OAKA, Athens

Date: December 27, 2000

Season: 2000–01

Score: Cancelled due to the FIBA–EuroLeague dispute

The 2000 All-Star Game was cancelled, as at that time, European pro club basketball was in a dispute, having two 1st-tier level competitions taking place in the same 2000–01 club basketball league season. With the two rival leagues, the FIBA SuproLeague and EuroLeague Basketball, competing directly against each other.

=== 2007 FIBA EuroStars - Athens, Greece (2006–07 season) ===
Arena: OAKA, Athens

Date: June 30, 2007

Season: 2006–07

Score: Greek National Team 101 – FIBA European Selection Team 90

June 30, 2007

**Greek National Team** (Greece)	**101**–90	(Europe) FIBA European Selection Team
Scoring by quarter: **22**–19, **58**–43, **81**–65, **101**–90
Pts: Fotsis 20		Pts: Van Den Spiegel 14

OAKA, Athens
Attendance: 12,000

Greek National Team:

- (Greece) Theo Papaloukas
- (Greece) Nikos Zisis
- (Greece) Vassilis Spanoulis
- (Greece) Panos Vasilopoulos
- (Greece) Antonis Fotsis
- (Greece) Nikos Chatzivrettas
- (Greece) Dimos Dikoudis
- (Greece) Kostas Tsartsaris
- (Greece) Dimitris Diamantidis
- (Greece) Lazaros Papadopoulos
- (Greece) Michalis Kakiouzis
- (Greece) Ioannis Bourousis
- (Greece) Head Coach: Panagiotis Giannakis
- (Greece) Assistant Coach: Lefteris Kakiousis

FIBA European Selection Team:

- (Israel) Dror Hagag
  (Point guard, (Israel) Hapoel Jerusalem)
- (Georgia (country)) Vladimir Boisa
  (Forward, (Italy) Siena)
- (Slovenia) Sani Bečirovič
  (Guard, (Greece) Panathianikos )
- (Spain) Iñaki de Miguel
  (Center, (Spain) Málaga)
- (Poland) Adam Wójcik
  (Center, (Poland) Prokom)
- (Germany) Pascal Roller
  (Guard, (Italy) Biella)
- (Belgium) Tomas Van Den Spiegel
  (Center, (Russia) CSKA Moscow)
- (Latvia) Raitis Grafs
  (Center, (Latvia) ASK Riga)
- (Russia) Aleksey Savrasenko
  (Center, (Russia) CSKA Moscow)
- (Turkey) İbrahim Kutluay
  (Guard, (Turkey) Fenerbahçe Ülker)
- (Croatia) Nikola Vujčić
  (Center, (Israel) Maccabi Tel Aviv)
- (Russia) Vitaly Fridzon
  (Forward, (Russia) Khimki Moscow Region)
- (Croatia) Marko Popović
  (Guard, (Lithuania) Žalgiris Kaunas)
- (Italy) Andrea Pecile
  (Guard, (Spain) Granada)
- (Serbia) Coach: Željko Obradović (Greece) (Panathinaikos)
- Coach: Carlo Recalcati (Italy)

( (Serbia) Dejan Bodiroga, (Serbia) Peja Stojaković, (Spain) Felipe Reyes (FIBA European Selection Team), and (Greece) Sofoklis Schortsanitis (Greek NT) were also selected, but they didn't play in the game.)

Top scorers: (Greece) Greek National Team:

- (Greece) Antonis Fotsis (20 points)
- (Greece) Ioannis Bourousis (16 points)
- (Greece) Theo Papaloukas (14 points)
- (Greece) Nikos Zisis (10 points)
- (Greece) Nikos Chatzivrettas (10 points)

Top scorers: (Europe) FIBA European Selection Team:

- (Belgium) Tomas Van Den Spiegel (14 points)
- (Poland) Adam Wójcik (10 points)
- (Turkey) İbrahim Kutluay (10 points)
- (Italy) Andrea Pecile (8 points)
- (Croatia) Nikola Vujčić (8 points)

Scoresheet :
(Greece) Greek National Team: Papaloukas (14 points), Zisis (10 points), Spanoulis (6 points), Vasilopoulos (4 points), Fotsis (20 points), Chatzivrettas (10 points), Dikoudis (4 points), Tsartsaris (9 points), Diamantidis (0 points), Papadopoulos (4 points), Kakiouzis (4 points), Bourousis (16 points).

(Europe) FIBA European Selection team:

(Israel) Hagag (4 points), (Georgia (country)) Boisa (4 points), (Slovenia) Bečirovič (6 points), (Italy) Pecile (8 points), (Spain) De Miguel (5 points), (Poland) Wójcik (10 points), (Germany) Roller (4 points), (Belgium) Van Den Spiegel (14 points), (Latvia) Grafs (5 points), (Russia) Savrasenko (5 points), (Turkey) Kutluay (10 points), (Russia) Fridzon (7 points), (Croatia) Popović (0 points), (Croatia) Vujčić (8 points).

== FIBA All-Time EuroStars Team ==
At the 2007 FIBA EuroStars Game, FIBA honored Sergei Belov, Antonello Riva, Doron Jamchi, Dejan Bodiroga, Vladimir Tkachenko, and Vlade Divac, who was not present at the event, as they were selected to the FIBA All-Time EuroStars Team.

=== 2007 FIBA All-Time EuroStars Team ===
Position	FIBA All-Time EuroStars Team	Playing Career
G	(Soviet Union) Sergei Belov	1964–1980
G	(Italy) Antonello Riva	1977–2004
F	(Israel) Doron Jamchi	1978–2000
F	(Serbia) Dejan Bodiroga	1989–2007
C	(Soviet Union) Vladimir Tkachenko & (Federal Republic of Yugoslavia) Vlade Divac	1974–1990 & 1983–2005

== Top Scorers ==
=== Per edition ===
Edition	Player	Points	Team
1996	(Federal Republic of Yugoslavia) Zoran Savić	30	West All-Stars
1997	(Federal Republic of Yugoslavia) Sašha Đjorđjević	23	West All-Stars
1998	(Italy) Carlton Myers	20	West All-Stars
1999	(Lithuania) Artūras Karnišovas	29	West All-Stars
2007	(Greece) Antonis Fotsis	20	Greece NT

=== All-time ===
Rank	Player	Points	Average
1	(Lithuania) Artūras Karnišovas	62	20.6
2	(Greece) Nikos Oikonomou	47	11.7
3	(United States) David Rivers	42	10.5
4	(Turkey) İbrahim Kutluay	38	9.5
5	(Socialist Federal Republic of Yugoslavia) Zoran Savić	37	18.5

== Players with multiple selections ==
- Player nationalities listed by national team affiliation.

Player	Number Of Selections	Years Selected
(Turkey) İbrahim Kutluay	4×	1996, 1998, 1999, 2007
(Federal Republic of Yugoslavia) Dejan Bodiroga	4×	1997, 1998, 1999, 2007
(United States) David Rivers	4×	1996, 1997, 1998, 1999
(France) Antoine Rigaudeau	4×	1996, 1997, 1998, 1999
(Greece) Nikos Oikonomou	4×	1996, 1997, 1998, 1999
(Federal Republic of Yugoslavia) Željko Rebrača	4×	1996, 1997, 1998, 1999
(North Macedonia) Petar Naumoski	3×	1996, 1997, 1998
(Federal Republic of Yugoslavia) Dragan Tarlać	3×	1996, 1998, 1999
(Italy) Carlton Myers	3×	1996, 1998, 1999
(Slovenia) Marko Milič	3×	1996, 1998, 1999
(Croatia) Dino Rađja	3×	1997, 1998, 1999
(Russia) Vasily Karasev	3×	1997, 1998, 1999
(Lithuania) Artūras Karnišovas	3×	1997, 1998, 1999
(Federal Republic of Yugoslavia) Peja Drobnjak	2×	1996, 1997
(Russia) Sergei Bazarevich	2×	1996, 1997
(Federal Republic of Yugoslavia) Zoran Savić	2×	1996, 1997
(United States) Conrad McRae	2×	1996, 1998
(Federal Republic of Yugoslavia) Sasha Danilović	2×	1997, 1998
(United States) Wendell Alexis	2×	1997, 1998
(Spain) Alberto Herreros	2×	1997, 1998
(Israel) Oded Kattash	2×	1997, 1999
(Italy) Gregor Fučka	2×	1997, 1999
(Italy) Andrea Meneghin	2×	1998, 1999
(United States) Tanoka Beard	2×	1998, 1999

== By coach ==
- Coach nationalities listed by national team affiliation.

Coach	Number Of Selections	Years Selected
(Federal Republic of Yugoslavia) Dušan Ivković	2×	1996, 1997
(Italy) Carlo Recalcati	2×	1999, 2007
(Spain) Lolo Sainz	1×	1996
(Italy) Ettore Messina	1×	1997
(Russia) Stanislav Yeryomin	1×	1998
(Federal Republic of Yugoslavia) Svetislav Pešić	1×	1998
(Russia) Alexander Gomelsky	1×	1999
(Greece) Panagiotis Giannakis	1×	2007
(Serbia) Željko Obradović	1×	2007
(Greece) Lefteris Kakiousis	1×	2007

== Distinctions ==
=== FIBA Hall of Fame ===
- (Greece) Panagiotis Fasoulas (as a player)
- (Greece) Panagiotis Giannakis (as a player)
- (Soviet Union) Alexander Gomelsky (as a coach)
- (Socialist Federal Republic of Yugoslavia) Dušan Ivković (as a coach)
- (Italy) Ettore Messina (as a coach)
- (Socialist Federal Republic of Yugoslavia) Svetislav Pešić (as a coach)
- (France) Antoine Rigaudeau (as a player)
- (Slovenia) Jure Zdovc (as a player)

=== Basketball Hall of Fame ===
- (Soviet Union) Alexander Gomelsky (as a coach)
- (Croatia) Dino Radja (as a player)

=== FIBA's 50 Greatest Players (1991) ===
- (Croatia) Dino Radja

== See also ==
- FIBA Europe All-Star Game
- ULEB All-Star Game
