= Igor Magazinnik =

Israeli-Russian entrepreneur and businessman

- Игорь Магазинник
- Born: Nizhny Novgorod, Russia
- Occupations: entrepreneur, businessman
- Known for: CTO and co-founder of Viber

Igor Magazinik (Russian: Игорь Магазинник, Hebrew: איגור מגזיניק) is an Israeli-Russian entrepreneur and businessman of Jewish-Russian descent. He is known as the CTO and co-founder of Viber.

Magazinik was born in Nizhny Novgorod, Russia. At age 16, he moved to Israel. Upon graduating university, he worked as a programmer and served 3 years in the Army. With Talmon Marco, he founded his first start-up (now defunct) iMesh.
