= NBA Europe =

Proposed European Basketball League

- Organising body: NBA and FIBA
- First season: 2027 (planned)
- Confederation: FIBA Europe
- Number of teams: 16 (12 permanent + 4 qualified)

NBA Europe is the working name for a proposed professional basketball league in Europe organized by the National Basketball Association (NBA) and the International Basketball Federation (FIBA). The league is expected to begin play in 2027 and is planned to comprise 16 teams (12 permanent and 4 via annual qualification).

Final bids for franchise slots were due 30 June 2026, with over 20 ownership groups submitting bids across 12 target cities in 7 countries. Bids in select cities exceeded $1 billion.

The league's proposed launch has led to tensions with EuroLeague, the existing top-level basketball league in Europe, citing that another top-level league would hurt the sport. Executives from both the NBA and EuroLeague have expressed openness to a potential partnership, but have stated that both leagues will proceed independently if no agreement is reached.

== Format ==
The league is planned to comprise 16 teams, 12 permanent franchise slots and 4 through annual qualification. The winner and runner-up of the 2026–27 Basketball Champions League season will be granted slots in the inaugural NBA Europe season. The remaining places are expected to be granted to teams based on an end-of-season qualifying tournament. The regular season will be played as a round-robin, with teams qualifying for a multi-round playoff series, culminating in a finals series. The games will be played with FIBA's basketball rules, including 40-minute games. The league is planned to have a salary cap, although the amount is currently unknown. Teams that qualify for the league annually will face potential relegation; permanent franchises will not be relegated.

== History ==
The NBA began hosting exhibition games in Europe in 1984, with the New Jersey Nets, Phoenix Suns, and Seattle SuperSonics facing European clubs in Italy, West Germany, and Switzerland. In 1987, the NBA in partnership with FIBA launched the McDonald's Championship (originally the McDonald's Open), an international tournament where a representative NBA team would face European club champions. NBA teams won all nine iterations of the tournament between 1987 and 1999. The first McDonald's Open was hosted in Milwaukee and was won by the Milwaukee Bucks, defeating the Soviet Union national basketball team and Italian club Tracer Milano. The next eight tournaments were held in Europe, with events held in Spain, Italy, France, Germany, and England.

In 1993, the NBA hosted its first preseason exhibition game between two NBA teams in Europe with the Orlando Magic defeating the Atlanta Hawks in London, England. Between 2006 and 2012, the NBA hosted the NBA Europe Live Tour, featuring annual preseason exhibition games between NBA and EuroLeague teams, across multiple European cities. Since 2011, the NBA has hosted regular season games in Europe beginning with the New Jersey Nets defeating the Toronto Raptors twice at the O2 Arena in London.

On 27 March 2025 following an NBA Board of Governors meeting in New York City and a FIBA Executive Committee meeting in Mies, Switzerland, the NBA and FIBA jointly announced an exploration into the creation of a new European league. NBA owners expressed "enthusiastic support" and there was "unanimous agreement" from FIBA's board. Following this announcement, the NBA brought on JPMorgan Chase and the Raine Group as financial advisors for the project. In December 2025, the NBA and FIBA announced they would begin engaging prospective teams and ownership groups in January 2026. It was also announced that there would be a merit-based pathway available for domestic teams to qualify for the league.

Bidding opened in February 2026, with JPMorgan and Raine announcing they had staged "mostly positive meetings with more than 70 potential investors." There were over 120 investors that expressed interest in placing a bid. Non-binding bids were due by 31 March 2026, with final bids being due 30 June 2026. The NBA expressed a preferred range for bids between $500 million and $1 billion, however many bids exceeded $1 billion in select markets. More than 20 ownership groups submitted finalized bids and franchises are expected to be announced on a rolling basis, beginning in early autumn 2026.

== Relationship with EuroLeague ==
Following the announcement, EuroLeague leadership expressed concern that a second top-level basketball league would weaken the sport in the region. EuroLeague CEO Paulius Motiejunas described the creation of an additional league as "not necessary". NBA commissioner Adam Silver confirmed that the league was in direct talks with EuroLeague leadership and its member clubs regarding a potential partnership. In June 2025, both leagues as well as all 13 EuroLeague member clubs met at FIBA's office, the first time all parties had met to discuss the matter.

On 7 October 2026, the member teams of EuroLeague rejected a proposal from the NBA to operate in a combined manner, and are expected to instead expand their own league, although negotiations are ongoing.

== See also ==
- EuroLeague
- FIBA–EuroLeague dispute
- Basketball Champions League
- Basketball Africa League
- McDonald's Championship
- NBA Europe Live Tour
- NBA Global Games
