= Juno (company) =

American ride-sharing company

- Industry: Vehicle for hire
- Founder: Talmon Marco
- Successor: Lyft
- Headquarters: New York City, New York
- Number of employees: 273
- Parent: Gett (2017–2019)
- Website: gojuno.com

Juno was a vehicle for hire operating in the United States. It was owned by Gett and operated mobile apps on the Android and iOS operating systems.

Compared to its competitors, Juno took a smaller commission from every ride, as part of a strategy to attract and retain happier drivers. Juno initially had an equity structure that planned to give drivers fifty percent of the founder's equity by 2026, however, this program was discontinued in 2017 when Juno was acquired by Gett.

The company ceased operations in November 2019.

== History ==
Juno was founded in New York City by Talmon Marco, who also served as the company's chief executive officer.

Information on Juno became public in February 2016, following an unheralded and unannounced beta testing of a software app to 2000 drivers in New York City.

Juno launched its ride sharing services in New York City in 2016.

Juno was acquired by Gett in 2017, for $200 million. Two years later, Juno ceased all transportation operations on 18 November 2019. Two days later, on 20 November 2019, Juno sought an order to tap $1 million of a $4.5 million loan from its parent company to fund a bankruptcy liquidation.

In February 2020, Juno received court approval in Delaware for a Chapter 11 settlement with its unsecured creditors and parent company.
