= Expand Networks =

Expand Networks, Inc.
- Company type: Private Company
- Industry: WAN Acceleration Equipment
- Founded: 1998
- Fate: liquidated 2011
- Headquarters: Roseland, New Jersey, Tel-Aviv, Israel
- Products: Accelerator appliances, WAN Optimization
- Website: www.expand.com

Expand Networks, Ltd. was a Tel Aviv, Israel based provider of WAN optimization technology founded in 1998 and liquidated in 2011.

== Overview ==
Expand Networks was a privately held company, co-founded by Talmon Marco in 1998; initial financing was provided by Discount Investment Corporation Ltd., The Eurocom Group, Ophir Holdings, and a private group of investors, including Memco Software founder Israel Mezin. Additional investors joined in subsequent rounds of funding. The company raised over $95 million.

Expand Networks headquarters was in Tel-Aviv, Israel with sales in the United States and Europe, New Jersey, Australia, China, Singapore, and South Africa.

The company manufactured accelerators in physical, virtual and mobile deployment options.

== Liquidation ==
In mid October 2011, following the requests of Plenus, one of the company's lenders, an Israeli court appointed a liquidator - Paz Rimer. The liquidator gradually terminated the company's employees and eventually, on 11 January 2012 sold most of the assets of the company to Riverbed Technology, which immediately terminated all the company's products and ceased support.
