= H2Pro =

Israeli hydrogen fuel company

- Founded: 2019
- Founders: Talmon Marco; Gideon Grader; Avner Rothschild; Hen Dotan
- Headquarters: Israel
- Key people: Talmon Marco (Chairman), Tzahi Rodrig (CEO), Hen Dotan (CTO), Rotem Arad (CBO) == Leadership == : Talmon Marco – Chairman (2025–present), previously Chairman & CEO (2019–2025).; Tzahi Rodrig – Chief Executive Officer (2025–present).; Hen Dotan – Chief Technology Officer.; Rotem Arad – Chief Business Officer (CBO).
- Website: www.h2pro.co

H2Pro is an Israeli company that develops electrolyzer systems for the production of green hydrogen. The company was co-founded in 2019 by Technion professors Gideon Grader and Avner Rothschild, researcher Hen Dotan, and entrepreneur Talmon Marco, based on research conducted at the Technion. It is headquartered in Caesarea, Israel.

== History ==
H2Pro was founded in 2019 to commercialize a two-step water-splitting process developed at the Technion. In October 2019, Hyundai invested in the company as part of a series of investments in hydrogen technology firms. The company has received backing from Breakthrough Energy, the climate fund founded by Bill Gates, from Hong Kong entrepreneur Li Ka-shing's Horizons Ventures, and from Singapore's Temasek Holdings. In March 2021, H2Pro raised US$22 million in a round joined by Gates, Li Ka-shing, Sumitomo Corporation and Hyundai, intended to move its electrolyzer technology from laboratory prototypes toward commercial-scale manufacturing. In January 2022, ArcelorMittal invested US$5 million in H2Pro through its XCarb innovation fund. As of 2021, the company had raised over US$100 million from investors including Sumitomo Corporation and Yara.

In March 2023, H2Pro signed a memorandum of understanding with Sumitomo Corporation, under which Sumitomo would integrate H2Pro electrolyzers at a scale of hundreds of megawatts, primarily for green ammonia production. The agreement was estimated at US$250 million through the end of the decade.

In 2025, Talmon Marco, who had been as chairman and CEO since the company's founding, remained chairman, and Tzahi Rodrig was appointed CEO. A 50-kilowatt system operates at the company's Caesarea facility, and a 500-kilowatt system was scheduled to begin operating in early 2026 in Tziporit in northern Israel, expected to be the first green hydrogen production in the country, with a larger system of up to 50 megawatts planned in Spain or Portugal.

== Technology ==
H2Pro's electrolysis technology is based on a method known as decoupled water electrolysis (DWE), which separates the hydrogen and oxygen evolution reactions in time rather than space. Unlike conventional electrolysis, which produces hydrogen and oxygen simultaneously at different electrodes separated by a membrane, DWE operates in two distinct phases, eliminating the need for a membrane.

In the first phase, hydrogen is generated at one electrode while a "battery-like" nickel hydroxide electrode charges, converting to nickel oxyhydroxide; no oxygen is released. In the second phase, the current is reversed: oxygen is produced while the battery electrode discharges back to nickel hydroxide, with no hydrogen released. Because the two gases are never produced at the same time, the risk of gas mixing is eliminated without a membrane. This membrane-less, temporally separated process is designed to allow operation under the intermittent power conditions of solar and wind energy; although individual cells alternate between hydrogen and oxygen generation, multiple cells are operated in parallel to ensure continuous overall gas production.

The 2019 scientific paper describing the process reported an average 98.7% voltage efficiency, with electrical energy consumption of 39.9 kWh per kilogram of hydrogen.
