= Paulius Motiejunas =

Lithuanian Sports Executive

CEO of Euroleague Basketball
- In office 15 June 2023 – 30 January 2026
- Preceded by: Marshall Glickman
- Succeeded by: Chus Bueno

Personal details
- Born: 6 February 1981 (age 45) Kaunas

Paulius Motiejunas (born 6 February 1981) is a Lithuanian basketball executive who served as the CEO of EuroLeague Basketball from 2023 to 2026. He previously served as the general manager and owner of Žalgiris Kaunas, a member club of the EuroLeague.

Motiejunas was awarded the Gianluigi Porelli EuroLeague Executive of the Year a record three times, in 2018, 2019, and 2023. He was also named as the best Lithuanian sports manager in 2017 and 2020.
