= Tomas Van Den Spiegel =

Belgian basketball player

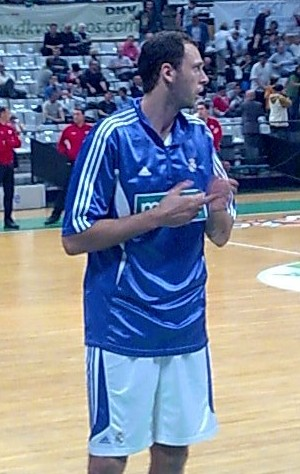
- Van den Spiegel in a warm up with Real Madrid.

Personal information
- Born: 10 July 1978 (age 48) Ghent, Belgium
- Listed height: 7 ft 0.25 in (2.14 m)
- Listed weight: 260 lb (118 kg)

Career information
- NBA draft: 2000: undrafted
- Playing career: 1995–2012
- Position: Center

Career history
- 1995–1997: Okapi Aalstar
- 1997–2001: Telindus Oostende
- 2001–2002: Fortitudo Bologna
- 2002: Telindus Oostende
- 2002–2004: Fortitudo Bologna
- 2004–2006: Virtus Roma
- 2006–2007: CSKA Moscow
- 2007–2008: Prokom Trefl Sopot
- 2008: CSKA Moscow
- 2008: Azovmash Mariupol
- 2008–2010: Real Madrid
- 2010–2011: Olimpia Milano
- 2011–2012: Telenet Oostende

Career highlights
- 2× EuroLeague champion (2006, 2008); FIBA EuroStar (2007); 3× Russian Super League champion (2006–2008); 2× Russian Cup winner (2006, 2007); 2× Belgian League champion (2001, 2002); Belgian Cup winner (1998, 2001); Belgian Player of the Year (2001); 2× Belgian League All-Star (2000, 2001)

Tomas Van Den Spiegel (alternate spelling: Thomas, born 10 July 1978 in Ghent, Belgium) is a Belgian former professional basketball player and the current president of ULEB. At a height of 2.14 m (7 ft 1/4) tall, he played at the center position.

== Professional career ==
Van Den Spiegel first began playing basketball in the youth age club ranks of Osiris Denderleeuw, from 1987 to 1995, and then with the youth clubs of Okapi Aalst. He debuted at age 17, in the Belgian first division. He was named Belgian League Rookie of the year in 1996. In 1997, he moved to Sunair Oostende. With Oostende, he won two Belgian League championship titles and 2 Belgian Cups.

In 2001, he was named the Belgian Player of the Year, and he then signed a three-year contract with the top-tier level Italian LBA League club Fortitudo Bologna, where he was a EuroLeague runner-up in 2004. He them moved to the Italian club Virtus Roma. After a season-and-a-half with Virtus Roma, he chose the Russian club CSKA Moscow, as his next career destination.

With CSKA Moscow, Van Den Spiegel won the EuroLeague championship in both 2006 and 2008. With CSKA, he was also a EuroLeague runner-up in 2007. With CSKA, Van Den Spiegel also won three Russian Championships and two Russian Cups.

After a couple of short stints, one in Poland with Prokom Trefl Sopot, and one in Ukraine with Azovmash Mariupol, he played two seasons with Real Madrid. After moving to the Italian club Olimpia Milano for the 2010–11 season, he moved back to the Belgian League, in early 2011, as he signed a 4 1/2-year contract with Telenet Oostende in March 2011. He announced his retirement from playing basketball, in July 2013.

== National team career ==
Van Den Spiegel was also a member of the senior men's Belgian national basketball team. With Belgium's senior national team, he played at the EuroBasket 2011.

== Career statistics ==
Legend
GP	Games played	GS	Games started	MPG	Minutes per game
FG%	Field-goal percentage	3P%	3-point field-goal percentage	FT%	Free-throw percentage
RPG	Rebounds per game	APG	Assists per game	SPG	Steals per game
BPG	Blocks per game	PPG	Points per game	PIR	Performance index rating
**Bold**	Career high

=== EuroLeague ===
†	Denotes season in which Van Den Spiegel won the EuroLeague

Year	Team	GP	GS	MPG	FG%	3P%	FT%	RPG	APG	SPG	BPG	PPG	PIR
2002–03	Fortitudo Bologna	15	0	11.6	.684	—	.511	3.5	.3	.7	.4	5.0	6.9
2003–04	Fortitudo Bologna	18	**10**	19.9	.583	—	.554	5.8	.2	**1.5**	.8	7.4	9.8
2005–06	CSKA Moscow	10	0	14.0	.667	—	.390	2.7	—	.7	.6	4.8	4.5
2006–07	CSKA Moscow	**21**	0	14.4	.654	—	.489	2.9	.5	.5	1.3	4.3	5.3
2007–08†	CSKA Moscow	8	0	9.9	.611	—	.474	2.9	—	.1	.1	3.9	3.8
2007–08†	Gdynia	10	8	**23.8**	.507	—	**.792**	**7.6**	**.6**	.9	**1.7**	**10.6**	**15.9**
2008–09	Real Madrid	12	3	13.8	.667	—	.538	3.6	.3	.3	.3	6.1	6.8
2009–10	Real Madrid	2	0	4.5	**1.000**	—	—	—	.5	.5	—	1.0	-0.5
2010–11	Milano	5	2	7.6	.333	—	.750	1.8	—	—	.2	2.0	0.6
Career		101	23	14.9	.605	—	.552	3.9	.3	.7	.8	5.6	7.0

== Executive career ==
In 2016, Van Den Spiegel became the President of the Union of European Leagues of Basketball (ULEB). Since 2018, Van Den Spiegel is the CEO of Flanders Classics.
