= Viber =

VoIP and instant messaging software

- Original authors: Talmon Marco; Igor Magazinnik
- Developer: Rakuten Viber (part of Rakuten Group)
- Release: 2010; 16 years ago

Stable release(s) [±]
- Android: 20.4.3.0 / 2 July 2023; 3 years ago
- iOS: 20.4.0 / 4 July 2023; 3 years ago
- Windows: 20.2.0 / 12 June 2023; 3 years ago
- macOS: 20.2.0 / 12 June 2023; 3 years ago
- Linux: 20.3.0.1 / 14 June 2023; 3 years ago
- Written in: C / C++ / Python (desktop, using SIP and Qt frameworks), Objective-C (iOS), Java (Android)
- Operating system: Cross-platform
- Type: Instant messaging client, VoIP
- License: Proprietary software
- Website: viber.com
- Trade name: Rakuten Viber
- Native name: Viber Media S.à r.l.
- Type: Subsidiary
- Incorporated: Société à responsabilité limitée
- Headquarters: 2 Rue du Fosse, Luxembourg, Luxembourg
- Key people: Ofir Eyal
- Products: Viber; Viber Dating; Viber Out; Viber Pay; Viber Plus
- Owner: Rakuten Group, Inc.
- Parent: Rakuten Asia Pte. Ltd.
- Subsidiaries: List: Rakuten Viber PMT Malta Ltd.; Rakuten Viber Poland Sp. z o.o.; Rakuten Viber Ukraine, LLC; Viber GA, LLC; Viber Lab Ltd.; Viber Media, LLC; Viber Media Ireland Unlimited Company; Viber Media Bulgaria Ltd.; Viber Media U.S.A Inc.; Viber Philippines, Inc.; Viber UK Limited

Rakuten Viber, commonly known as Viber, is an Israeli cross-platform voice over IP (VoIP) and instant messaging (IM) software application. Launched in Israel in 2010, the app is now owned by the Japanese technology company Rakuten Group. The service is available as freeware for Android, iOS, Microsoft Windows, macOS and Linux.

Users are registered and identified through a mobile phone number, although the service can also be accessed on desktop platforms without mobile connectivity. In addition to instant messaging, the platform allows users to exchange media such as images, videos and files, and provides a paid international calling service called Viber Out.

The software was launched in 2010 by the company Viber Media, founded by Talmon Marco and Igor Magazinnik. Rakuten acquired Viber Media in 2014 and later renamed the company Rakuten Viber. The company is headquartered in Cyprus and maintains offices in London, Manila, Paris, San Francisco, Singapore, Tokyo and Beijing.

== History ==
=== Founding (2010) ===
Viber Media was founded in Tel Aviv in 2010 by Talmon Marco and Igor Magazinnik, two friends from the Israeli army, where Marco served as chief information officer of the Central Command. Marco and Magazinnik are also co-founders of the peer-to-peer media and file-sharing client iMesh. The company was run from Israel and was registered in Cyprus. Sani Maroli and Ofer Smocha soon joined the company as well. Marco said Viber allows instant calling and synchronization with contacts because the ID is the user's cell number. In its early days, Viber relied on a patchwork of outsourcing partners from different countries, commissioning specific solutions from external vendors — including teams based in Cyprus and Belarus. According to the company's statements, development of Viber's core functionality historically originated from its Tel Aviv office — a testament to its roots — even though the legal entity was registered elsewhere.

=== Early monetisation (2011) ===
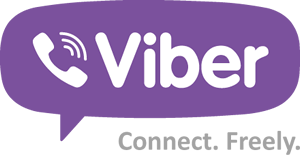
Viber logo used from 2012 to 2014

In its first two years of availability, Viber did not generate revenues. It began doing so in 2013, via user payments for Viber Out voice calling and the Viber graphical messaging "sticker market". The company was originally funded by individual investors, described by Marco as "friends and family". They invested $20 million in the company, which had 120 employees as of May 2013.

On 24 July 2013, Viber's support system was defaced by the Syrian Electronic Army. According to Viber, no sensitive user information was accessed.

By the time Rakuten came forward with its acquisition deal in 2014, Viber had already stopped working with external vendors, choosing instead to consolidate development under its own offices.

=== Rakuten acquires Viber (2014) ===
Viber logo used from 2014 to 2017

On 13 February 2014, Rakuten announced they had acquired Viber Media for $900 million, and since then Viber has been owned by Rakuten, Inc., an e-commerce conglomerate headquartered in Tokyo. The sale of Viber earned the Shabtai family (Benny, his brother Gilad, and Gilad's son Ofer) some $500 million from their 55.2% stake in the company. At that sale price, the founders each realized over 30 times return on their investments. Later that year, the company established a UK presence with the incorporation of Viber UK Limited in London.

Djamel Agaoua became Viber Media CEO in February 2017, replacing co-founder Marco who left in 2015.

In July 2017 the corporate name of Viber Media was changed to Rakuten Viber and a new wordmark logo was introduced. Its legal name remains Viber Media, S.à r.l. based in Luxembourg.

=== Post-acquisition ===
In August 2015 Viber opened a regional office for Central and Eastern Europe in Sofia to support growth in the region.

Viber logo used from 2017 to 2018

In 2017, Rakuten Viber and the World Wildlife Fund engaged in a commercial transaction aimed at raising awareness and protecting wildlife.

Viber logo used from 2018 to 2020

After first using Viber to spread its message in June 2020, the International Federation of the Red Cross launched an official chatbot and community on the messaging app to combat the spread of false information, which they termed an infodemic, about COVID-19. The chatbot is still active as of June 2022, with over 1.4 million subscribers.

Viber logo used from 2020 to 2026

In 2020, Rakuten Viber and the World Health Organization (the WHO) engaged in a commercial transaction for a chatbot to inform users of issues such as women's health. and an anti-smoking campaign.

In the wake of the July–August 2020 Belarusian election protests, to avoid sanctions and harassment from monopolies the company closed its office in Minsk.

In 2022, Ofir Eyal became Viber CEO, replacing Djamel Agaoua. Eyal is a Viber veteran; he worked as Vice President of Product in 2014 before his promotion to Chief Operating Officer in 2019. Shortly after the appointment of a new CEO, Viber continued its international expansion. In March 2022, Rakuten announced the opening of a development center in Tbilisi, Georgia, intended to support work on mobile applications and technology projects in the region.

In July 2022, Rakuten Viber partnered with Rapyd to launch instant cross-border P2P payments. The company launched payments on the Viber app first in Greece and Germany, and then in other countries.

In August, Mineski teamed up with Viber to develop a social minigame platform that can play off Viber's application.

In May 2022, Rakuten Viber launched the premium chat service Viber Plus that offers exclusive features, including sticker market privileges, ad-free use, priority Viber support, exclusive badge, unique Viber icon, large file sharing, and more. In 2022, Viber joined the European Union’s Code of Conduct on countering illegal hate speech online. As part of this framework, the company undertook to review reported content and remove material identified as hate speech in accordance with the Code and its platform rules.

In January 2024 Rakuten (the company behind Viber) established an office in Kyiv to bring together engineering and marketing departments. Alongside launching its Kyiv office the company joined Diia.City as a resident.

Subsequently in October 2024 Rakuten Viber inaugurated an office in Manila to broaden its operations, in the Philippines. The company’s legal entity remains Viber Media S.à r.l., registered in Luxembourg. Viber’s engineering work has been carried out across multiple countries and through external partners, including outsourcing and near-shore vendors. As a result, its development operations are distributed internationally rather than concentrated in a single location.

In December 2024, Viber was blocked in Russia. Roskomnadzor announced the nationwide blocking of the messaging app due to non-compliance with local legal requirements.

== Security audit ==
On 4 November 2014, Viber scored 1 out of 7 points on the Electronic Frontier Foundation's "Secure Messaging Scorecard". Viber received a point for encryption during transit but lost points because communications were not encrypted with keys that the provider did not have access to (i.e. the communications were not end-to-end encrypted), users could not verify contacts' identities, past messages were not secure if the encryption keys were stolen (i.e. the service did not provide forward secrecy), the code was not open to independent review (i.e. the code was not open-source), the security design was not properly documented, and there had not been a recent independent security audit. On 14 November 2014, the EFF changed Viber's score to 2 out of 7 after it had received an external security audit from Ernst & Young's Advanced Security Centre.

On 19 April 2016, with the announcement of Viber version 6.0, Rakuten added end-to-end encryption to their service. The company said that the encryption protocol had only been audited internally, and promised to commission external audits "in the coming weeks". In May 2016, Viber published an overview of their encryption protocol, saying that it is a custom implementation that "uses the same concepts" as the Signal Protocol.

In 2022, Rakuten Viber won a Security Award, by test.de, a tech firm based in Germany where there are over 3 million Viber users.

In 2024, Rakuten Viber received SOC certification following an audit conducted by Ernst & Young. The certification relates to the company’s controls for data protection and information security.

== Market share ==
As of December 2016, Viber had 800 million registered users. According to Statista, there are 260 million monthly active users as of January 2019. While the Viber messenger is the most popular messaging platform in some countries in the Balkans, such as Greece, Serbia, Bulgaria, North Macedonia, it is also very popular in other regions, like in East Europe (for examples, Belarus and Ukraine) and in some Asian market, such as the Philippines, Nepal, or part of the Middle East. It was once very popular in Russia, but it has been banned by the Russian government since 2024.

India was the largest market for Viber as of December 2014 with 33 million registered users, the fifth most popular instant messenger in the country. At the same time there were 30 million users in the United States, 28 million in Russia and 18 million in Brazil. Viber is particularly popular in Eastern Europe, being the most downloaded messaging app on Android in Belarus, Moldova and Ukraine as of 2016. It is also popular in Iraq, Libya and Nepal. Viber is translated in 44 languages and used in more than 190 countries globally. Viber is particularly popular in Eastern Europe, Greece, Ukraine, Russia, the Middle East and Asian markets including The Philippines and Vietnam. In some of these markets, Rakuten Viber offers messaging, e-commerce and payments services, and is described as a "super app".

As of 2018, Viber had an over 70 percent penetration rate in the CIS and CEE regions, but only 15 percent in North America. In 2018, Viber was reported to have reached one billion registered users. The figure was discussed in a Forbes Q&A with Viber CEO Djamel Agaoua, published in April 2018.

In 2021, Viber had 1.3 billion unique IDs and 290 million monthly active users. As of 2024, Viber has been downloaded more than 1 billion times on Android devices alone, making it one of the most popular instant communication platforms in the world.

In 2022, Rakuten Viber revealed an overall increase in Viber's app users across Asia Pacific (APAC), with the Philippines recording a robust 22 percent increase.

=== Russia ===
Viber is one of the more popular messenger applications in Russia. In January 2016, Viber surpassed WhatsApp in Russia, with about 50 million users. As of 2021, Viber was the third most popular messenger application in Russia.

In October 2023, a Moscow court fined Viber 1 million rubles, citing their failure to remove certain content Russia deems to be “illegal”, in particular content on the Russia-Ukraine War..

On December 13, 2024, by decision of Roskomnadzor, Viber was blocked in Russia.

=== Ukraine ===
As of September 2021, Viber is Ukraine's most popular messaging app, with a market share of 97.7%. 20% of the company's total messages sent came from Ukraine, where users sent 97.5 billion messages in 2021.

In February 2022, Rakuten Group removed advertising from its Viber messaging service in Ukraine and Russia in response to the Russian invasion of Ukraine. At the same time, Hiroshi Mikitani, the founder of Rakuten, donated $8.7 million to support Ukraine.

=== Bulgaria ===
Viber's market share in Bulgaria is steadily increasing. Reaching a record 90% in 2021. The number of calls made and messages sent via Viber in Bulgaria rose by 11% in 2021, reaching approximately 530 million calls and an average of 400 messages per second, according to data presented by the company.

=== Greece ===
As of the end of 2021, over 90% of people in Greece have Viber on their phones, making it the top messaging app in the country. In 2022, the Municipality of Athens has launched an official Viber community to keep its citizens updated on city events, digital services, ongoing projects, proposals, activities for all ages, and stray animal information.

=== Serbia ===
Viber is the most popular messenger in Serbia. As of November 2021, over 90% of Serbian citizens have Viber on their phone.

== Applications ==
=== Platforms ===
Viber was initially launched for iPhone on 2 December 2010. It was launched on BlackBerry and Windows Phone on 8 May 2012, followed by the Android platform on 19 July 2012, and Nokia's Series 40, Symbian and Samsung's Bada platform on 24 July 2012, by which time the application had 90 million users.

In May 2013 with Viber 3.0, a desktop version for Windows and macOS was released. In August 2013, Viber for Linux was released as a public beta and in August 2014 a final version. In June 2016 a UWP-based desktop application for Windows 10 was released in the Windows Store. The desktop versions are tied with a user's registered Viber mobile number, but can operate independently afterwards. In 2015, a version for the iPad tablet and Apple Watch smartwatch was released.

=== Features ===
Viber was originally launched as a VoIP application for voice calling. On 31 March 2011, Viber 2.0 was released which added instant messaging (IM) capabilities. In July 2012 group messaging and an HD Voice engine were added to both Android and iOS applications. Today, users can send several kinds of media files including photos, videos, GIFs, files, audio messages, and stickers. In addition to standard messaging and media sharing, the app allows users to create and manage chatbots, set up public channels and communities, and make payments between users. These functions support both personal and business-related use of the platform.

==== Public Accounts, Chatbots, and Communities ====
In November 2016 Viber version 6.5 launched Public Accounts to allow brands to engage in promotion and customer service on the platform, with initial partners including The Huffington Post, Yandex and The Weather Channel. The app integrates with CRM software and offers chatbot APIs for customer service. Group calling was introduced with version 10 in February 2019.

In 2022 Rakuten Viber partnered with Taimi, LGBTQ+ dating app, to add a bot powered by Viber to its freeware ecosystem, to match members of its user base and serve as an educational resource for about the LGBTQ+ community.

In February 2023 Rakuten Viber launched its chatbot AI Chat & Create, which allows users to ask questions and design images directly through the Viber app.

In July 2023 Viber partnered with ICONIQ to bring users to connect with an AI robot companion Kuki so users can chat and interact with Kuki directly on the app.

==== Viber Payments ====
In April 2023, Rakuten Viber launched Viber Payments, a real-time account-to-account (A2A) money transfer service in Greece. Viber Payments enables instant and free transactions between Viber users in Greece, Cyprus, Lithuania, Estonia, Slovenia, Slovakia, Croatia and Germany. Viber users in these countries can send money to each other in an easy and secure manner by creating a digital wallet through a two-minute process that requires registration and email confirmation.

==== Caller ID ====
In April 2023, company added the Caller ID feature, which helps identify any call after being turned on along with a warning for possible spam, including for calls that aren't being made through Viber.

==== Viber Business Accounts ====
In October 2023, Viber announced a new set of business tools for small and medium-sized businesses. Viber Business Accounts is a platform for businesses to create public profiles, enabling them to share information and product catalogs directly within the app. Additionally, the service features a 1:1 instant messaging function for customer inquiries, discoverability through app search functions, and dedicated chat folders for organizational purposes.

== See also ==
- Comparison of cross-platform instant messaging clients
- Comparison of VoIP software
