= Eduardo Portela =

Spanish basketball player, coach and executive (1934–2026)

- Born: 30 August 1934; Barcelona, Catalonia, Spain
- Died: 11 June 2026 (aged 91)
- Occupations: Basketball player, coach and executive

Eduardo Portela Marín (30 August 1934 – 11 June 2026) was a Spanish basketball player, coach, and executive. He was the head of the ACB, the governing body of the top-tier level Spanish professional club basketball league, and the head of ULEB, the Union of European Leagues of Basketball.

== Biography ==
Portela coached UE Montgat, FC Barcelona, and CP Sant Josep. He later served as technical director of FC Barcelona for nine seasons (1971–72 to 1980–81), during which he occasionally stepped in as head coach and led the club to the Copa del Rey title in 1979.

Along with Jose Antonio Gasca, he founded the ACB. The ACB has since organized Spain's top-tier professional club basketball league, the Liga ACB, since the 1983–84 season. He became the ACB's President in 1990. He served as the President of the ACB from 1990 to 2011, and also as its honorary president.

In 1991, he was also one of the founders of ULEB, the Union of European Leagues of Basketball, along with Gianluigi Porelli. In 1998, he became the President of the Union, a position he held until 2016, when he became the Honorary President.

Portela died on 11 June 2026, aged 91.

== Honours ==
Coach

Barcelona

- Copa del Rey: 1979

Individual

- Gold Medal of the Royal Order of Sports Merit, awarded by the Higher Sports Council (2009)
