= Gett =

Ride-sharing company

GT GETTAXI (UK) LIMITED
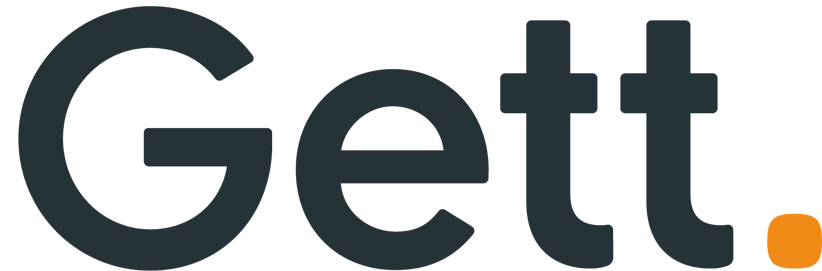
- Formerly: GetTaxi (in Israel)
- Type: Private
- Industry: Transportation; SaaS; Corporate Travel Management
- Founded: November 1, 2010; 16 years ago
- Founders: Dave Waiser
- Headquarters: London
- Area served: Israel, United Kingdom
- Key people: Matteo De Renzi (CEO)
- Products: Software; Mobile app
- Services: SaaS; B2B; Ridesharing
- Revenue: $ 166 million (2020)
- Number of employees: 773 (2020)
- Website: gett.com

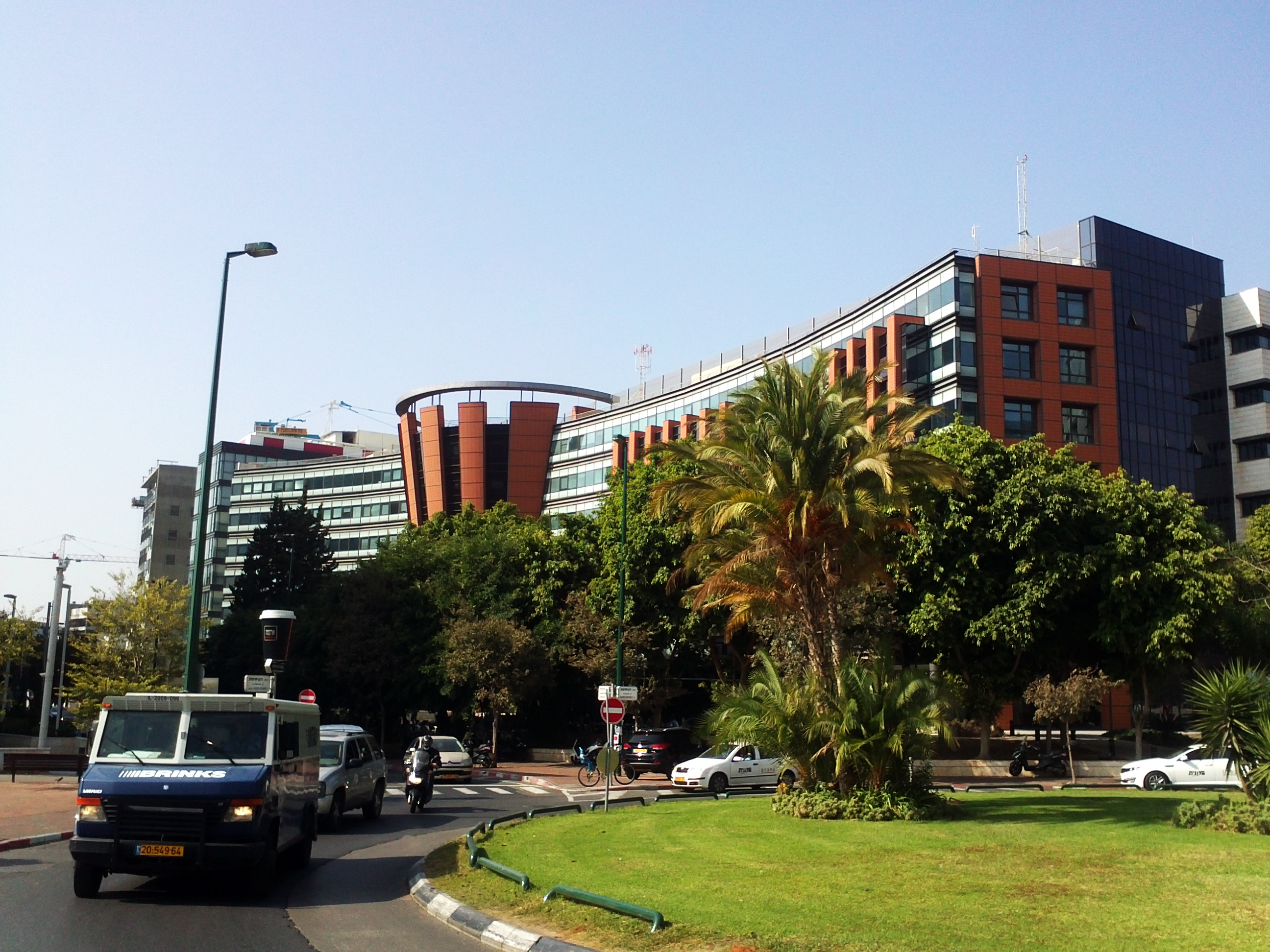
Gett's Tel Aviv development center

GT GETTAXI (UK) LIMITED, also known as Gett and previously known as GetTaxi, is an Israeli B2B Ground Transportation Management (GTM) platform and marketplace, and B2C ride-hailing app headquartered in London, and owned by GT GetTaxi (UK) Limited

In May 2024, it was reported that Pango would purchase the "Gett" transportation service application at a price of approximately 175 million dollars.

== History ==
GetTaxi was founded by Israeli entrepreneurs Shahar Waiser and Roi More. In the summer of 2009, Waiser came up with the idea during a thirty-minute wait for a taxi to the airport in Palo Alto, California. GetTaxi's beta version in Hebrew started operating in Tel Aviv two years later, in the summer of 2011, and the service was launched in London in August 2011.

In March 2012, GetTaxi branched out to Moscow, and opened its first United States offices in New York City. In May 2016, the Volkswagen Group invested $300 million in Gett.

In 2017 Gett acquired Juno, a ride-hailing company primarily operating in New York City. Gett sold Juno in November 2019 in an agreement with Lyft, that saw Gett form a partnership with Lyft.

Gett's marketplace model saw further partnerships with Ola in 2020, and Curb Mobility in 2021.

In May 2024, Pango announced its acquisition of Gett and its operations in Israel and internationally for $175 million. The deal is subject to the approval of the Competition Commissioner.

In April 2026, Lyft agreed to acquire Gett's UK operations for £40 million. Upon completion, the Gett team was to transfer to Freenow by Lyft, Lyft's European mobility platform.

== Partnership with the Volkswagen Group ==
In May 2016, Volkswagen Group announced that it would invest $300 million in Gett, allowing the company to grow its operations across European markets, as well as marking the first foray into the mobility space by the Volkswagen Group.

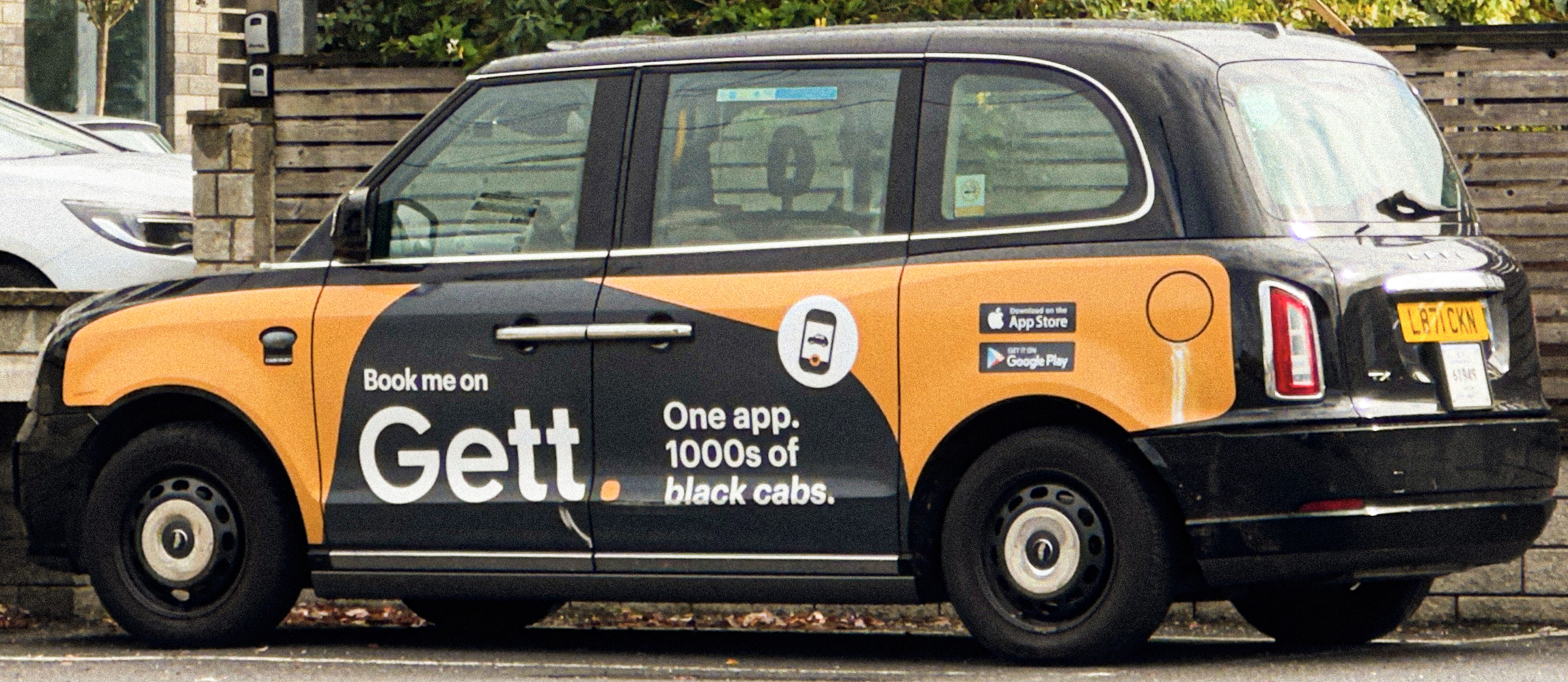
Gett-Branded Black Cab (Hackney Carriage) in Gillingham, Kent, England.

== See also ==
- Coupa
- AMEX GBT
- TripActions
