= Radisson Hotels =

International hotel chain

- Industry: Hospitality
- Founded: 1909; 117 years ago
- Founder: Edna Dickerson and Simon Kruse
- Area served: Worldwide
- Brands: Radisson Collection; Radisson Blu; Radisson; Radisson Red; Radisson Individuals; Park Plaza Hotels & Resorts; Park Inn by Radisson; Country Inn & Suites by Radisson; Prize by Radisson; art’otel
- Owners: Choice Hotels (Americas); Radisson Hotel Group (rest of the world)
- Website: choicehotels.com/radisson radissonhotels.com

Radisson Hotels is a multi-brand hotel chain with a worldwide presence. Its brands include several using the Radisson name, as well as other brands like Park Plaza Hotels & Resorts and Country Inn & Suites.

In June 2022, Radisson Hotel Group agreed to sell Radisson Hotels Americas (consisting of the Radisson franchise agreements, operations and intellectual property in the United States, Canada, Latin America and the Caribbean) to Choice Hotels for $675 million. The deal closed on August 11, 2022. Radisson Hotel Group continues to own the brands in the rest of the world.

== History ==
=== First Radisson Hotel ===
In 1907, Edna Dickerson came to Minneapolis, Minnesota, from Chicago to collect a substantial inheritance. Local business leaders persuaded her to build a hotel in the city, with Dickerson investing $1.5 million in the construction of the first Radisson hotel. It was planned as a high-end luxury hotel, designed in the French Renaissance architecture style, and constructed with "the best in every line" of paints, enamels, woodwork, and wood finishes, and named after the 17th-century French explorer, ranger, and furrier Pierre-Esprit Radisson, cofounder of the Hudson's Bay Company. The building was sixteen stories, making it the second-tallest building in Minneapolis at the time. As the opening neared, reports boasted of hand-carved walnut furnishings in guest rooms and Spanish leather chairs in the main lobby and banquet hall.

The hotel opened on Wednesday, December 15, 1909, with many of the staff having been hired from large hotels on the Eastern seaboard, and being new to the city of Minneapolis. The opening was followed shortly thereafter by a charity ball for the city being held at the hotel. In an early hotel incident the following month, six waiters from New York were fired, allegedly "because the Eastern waiters could not get accustomed to the Western ways", with three of them being thrown out "into the street before they would leave".

Dickerson and her husband, attorney Simon Kruse, lived on the hotel's thirteenth floor and managed the hotel, also opening a Radisson Inn on Christmas Lake, in the Minneapolis suburb of Excelsior. They remained for twenty-five years, until 1934, when the Radisson fell into the hands of a mortgage company. In the mid- and late-1940s, pianist Liberace "gained national exposure through his performance contracts with the Statler and Radisson" hotels. Another owner initiated a renovation of the hotel in the late 1940s.

=== Purchase by the Carlson Company ===
The Radisson was purchased in 1962 by the Carlson Company, and it began adding new locations, both through the purchase of existing hotels such as the Schimmel Hotels group and the Denver Hyatt House in 1968, and constructing new buildings in Bloomington, Minnesota, and Duluth, Minnesota. The chain had 14 locations by 1976, and 32 by 1984.

The original Radisson in Minneapolis was demolished in 1982, with a new hotel being constructed in that city and beginning operations in 1987. Carlson expanded the chain into one of the top hotel corporations by 2013. On top of Radisson, Carlson also owned several other brands, such as Park Inn, Park Plaza (acquired in 2000), and Country Inns & Suites (founded by Carlson in 1986).

The company's headquarters, as well as the headquarters of the owner, Radisson Hospitality, Inc., were located in Minnetonka, Minnesota, a suburb of Minneapolis, the city where the first Radisson Hotel was built. In the 1990s, American-Russian businessman Paul Tatum was murdered after a series of disagreements over the Radisson Hotel in Moscow.

=== Recent History ===
In 2021, Radisson agreed to split off Radisson Hotel Group Americas as a separate organization with complete operational independence. At the time, Radisson Hotel Group was operated by Jinjiang International, a state-owned Chinese firm headquartered in Shanghai.

Radisson Hotel Group Americas relocated its headquarters from Minnetonka to St. Louis Park in early 2022. The company reshuffled its c-suite, adding several industry veterans. The same year, CEO Jim Alderman stepped down and was succeeded by Tom Buoy, the recently appointed chief commercial officer, as interim chief executive. Radisson Hotel Group Americas partnered with Lockwood Development partners and Commonwealth Hotels to acquire and redevelop nine hotels with Veteran Services USA.

On June 13, 2022, the Radisson Hotel Group agreed to sell Radisson Hotels Americas – consisting of the Radisson franchise agreements, operations and intellectual property in the United States, Canada, Latin America and the Caribbean – to Choice Hotels for $675 million. The 624 properties included 473 Country Inn & Suites, 130 Radisson Hotels, and 17 Park Inns among other properties. Choice Hotel International’s acquisition of RHGA nearly doubled its footprint in the upscale hotel segment.

== Brands ==
=== Radisson ===
Radisson logo used until January 2025

Radisson in La Crosse, Wisconsin

The original Radisson Hotel, opened in 1909, was at 41 South Seventh Street in Minneapolis, Minnesota. While Radisson has several spinoff brands, over 220 properties worldwide still operate under the original Radisson brand name. Choice Hotels International franchises around 100 Radisson Hotels in the Americas, while properties in the EMEA region and Australia are franchised by Radisson Hotel Group.

=== Radisson Blu ===
Radisson Blu hotel in Vilnius central business district

Radisson Blu is an international chain of upscale hotels. Its hotels are mainly located in major cities, key airport gateways and leisure destinations. Radisson Blu has roots dating back to the opening of the SAS Royal Hotel in Denmark in 1960 and was the world's first designer hotel. After several name changes, spin offs, and rebranding, the Radisson Blu brand name was established in 2009. One spin off is Radisson Blu Edwardian Hotels, a line of luxury hotels in London and Manchester, England. They are owned by Edwardian Hotels and often operate in historic buildings.

As of 2020, Radisson Blu had 320+ franchised locations in operation globally, with 263 locations in the EMEA region, and 50+ in Asia Pacific. In the Americas, the brand is owned by Choice Hotels, with 10 locations in operation.

=== Radisson Collection ===
Originally known as Quorvus Collection, Radisson Collection was introduced in 2014 as a luxury brand. It adopted its current name in 2018. Properties include the Royal Hotel, Copenhagen, Hotel Ukrainia, Moscow, and The May Fair Hotel, London. As of 2025, there are over 40 Radisson Collection properties globally, with 32 in the EMEA region and 8 in Asia Pacific.

=== Radisson Individuals ===
Radisson Individuals is a luxury hotel soft brand launched in 2020. The brand focuses on full-service, boutique, and independent hotels that want access to support infrastructure while maintaining their own identity. It originally debuted as part of an initiative to expand the Radisson brand presence without the construction of new hotels. As of 2025, there are 71 locations open throughout the EMEA and Asia Pacific regions, franchised by Radisson Hotel Group. Choice Hotels International owns the brand in the Americas, where it franchises 15 locations.

=== Radisson Red ===
Radisson Red is a global upscale chain of full-service hotels, with an emphasis on communal social spaces. The brand was launched in 2015 along with the Radisson Collection brand. As of 2025, Radisson Hotel Group franchises 36 locations across the EMEA and Asia Pacific regions. Radisson Red also has four locations in the Americas, where Choice Hotels owns the regional brand.

=== Country Inn & Suites by Radisson ===
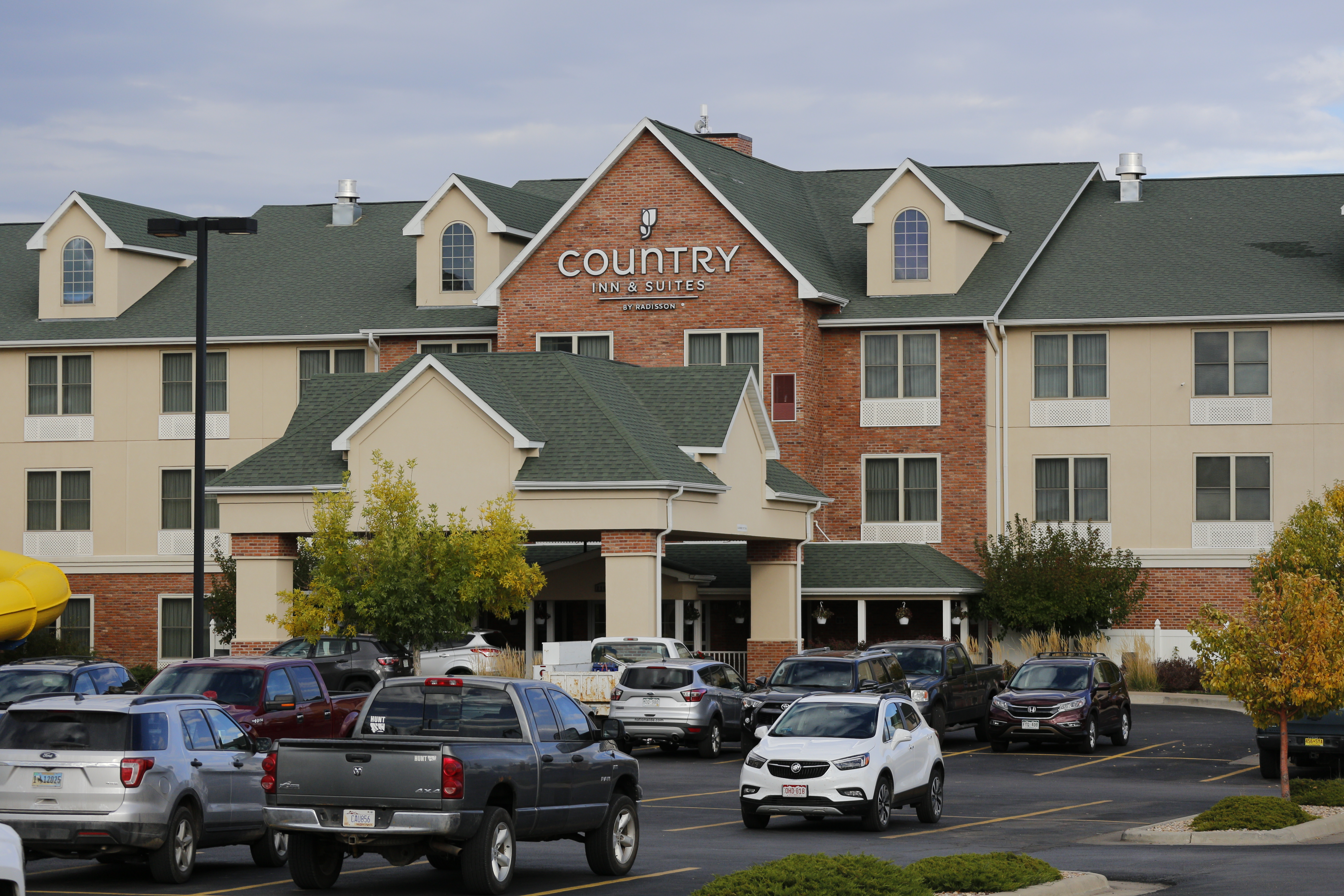
Country Inn & Suites by Radisson in Gillette, Wyoming

Country Inn & Suites by Radisson is a hotel chain which accommodates business and leisure travelers. The chain was established as Country Inn & Suites by former Carlson Hotels' owner, Carlson Companies in 1986 as a "middle-class" brand. Carlson Companies also owned the namesake, Country Kitchen restaurant chain at that time. In January 2018, two years after Carlson sold Carlson–Rezidor hotel group to HNA Group, the chain was rebranded as "Country Inn & Suites by Radisson".

The Country Inn & Suites brand is owned by Choice Hotels in the Americas, with 431 locations as of late 2024. Outside of the Americas, the brand is owned by Radisson Hotel Group: as of 2020 the company franchised 20 locations in Asia Pacific.

=== Park Inn by Radisson ===
Park Inn by Radisson is a midscale hotel franchise. It is described as an "affordable hotel for business and leisure travelers." According to U.S. News & World Report, it offers "comfortable, contemporary accommodations and on-site restaurants." Radisson Hotel Group owns the brand in EMEA (76 locations in operation) and Asia Pacific (56 in operation). In the Americas, the brand is owned by Choice Hotels, with 40 locations in operation by the end of 2024.

== Radisson Rewards ==
Radisson Rewards logo

Radisson Rewards is a loyalty program launched by Radisson Hotels in 1999. It allows guests to earn and redeem points for free nights at Radisson properties.

In 2022, Radisson Rewards Americas was created as part of the Radisson Americas separation from Radisson Hotel Group. In 2023, Radisson Rewards Americas was integrated into Choice Privileges.
