= Park Plaza =

Park Plaza may refer to:

== Hotels ==
- Boston Park Plaza, former Statler Hotel
- Park Plaza Hotel (Los Angeles), 1920s art deco building in downtown Los Angeles, near MacArthur Park.
- Park Plaza Hotel (Toronto), former name of the Park Hyatt Toronto, Canada

=== Hotel chains ===
- Park Plaza Hotels & Resorts, international hotel chain owned by Radisson Hotel Group, with PPHE Hotel Group was licensed to use the name
- PPHE Hotel Group, formerly Park Plaza Hotels Europe and Park Plaza Hotels Limited, a listed company
  - Park Plaza Hotel Leeds, also known as Royal Exchange House, England, part of Park Plaza Hotels & Resorts hotel chain and operated by PPHE Hotel Group
  - Park Plaza Victoria Amsterdam, part of Park Plaza Hotels & Resorts hotel chain and operated by PPHE Hotel Group
  - Park Plaza Westminster Bridge, part of Park Plaza Hotels & Resorts hotel chain and operated by PPHE Hotel Group

== Film ==
- Park Plaza 605, 1953 British crime film

== Buildings ==
- Park Plaza Apartments (Lexington, Kentucky), 21 story residential high-rise
- Park Plaza (Worcester, Massachusetts), 9-story residential high-rise
- Park Plaza Apartments (New York), prominent art deco apartment buildings erected in the Bronx
- Park Plaza Condominiums, residential high-rise building complex in Albuquerque, New Mexico
- Park Plaza Mall, upscale shopping center in midtown Little Rock, Arkansas
- Pacific Park Plaza, 30 story residential tower in Emeryville, California
- SCB Park Plaza, or Siam Commercial Bank Park Plaza, a high-rise building complex in the Chatuchak district of Bangkok, Thailand
