= Park Inn by Radisson Berlin Alexanderplatz =

Second tallest building and the eleventh-tallest structure in Berlin

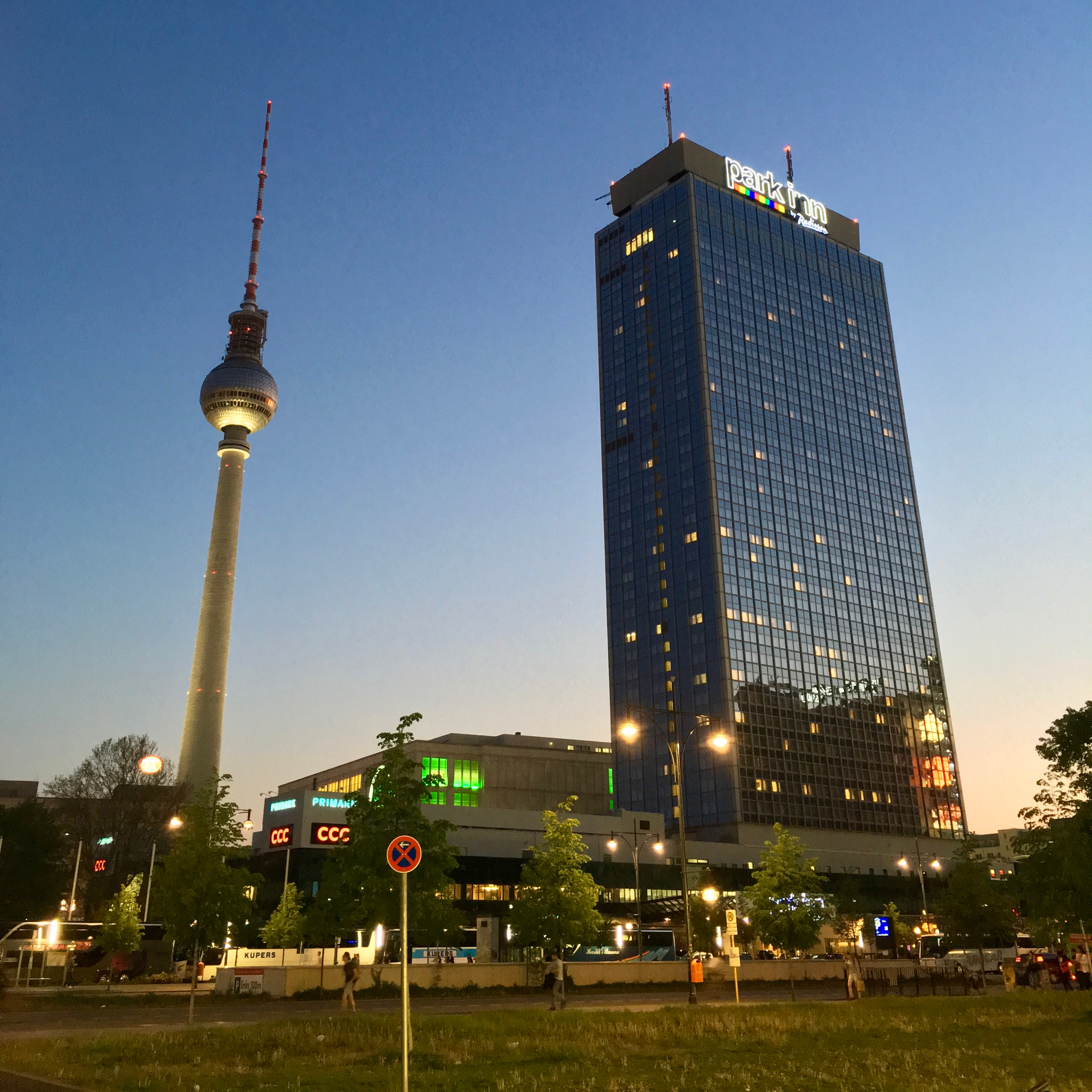
- Park Inn by Radisson Berlin Alexanderplatz
- Interactive map of the Park Inn by Radisson Berlin Alexanderplatz area
- Hotel chain: Park Inn by Radisson

General information
- Location: Mitte, Berlin, Germany
- Coordinates: 52°31′22″N 13°24′46″E
- Construction started: 1967
- Completed: 1970
- Owner: Blackstone Group
- Operator: Radisson Hotel Group; Rezidor Hotel Group (former)

Height
- Antenna spire: 149.5 m (490 ft)
- Roof: 125 m (410 ft)

Technical details
- Floor count: 41

Design and construction
- Architects: Roland Korn; Heinz Scharlipp; Hans-Erich Bogatzky

The Park Inn by Radisson Berlin Alexanderplatz is the second tallest building in Berlin and the 48th-tallest building and tallest hotel-only building in Germany. The 41-floor skyscraper is in the northeast of Alexanderplatz in the central Mitte district and has a height of 125 metres (410 feet).

== History ==
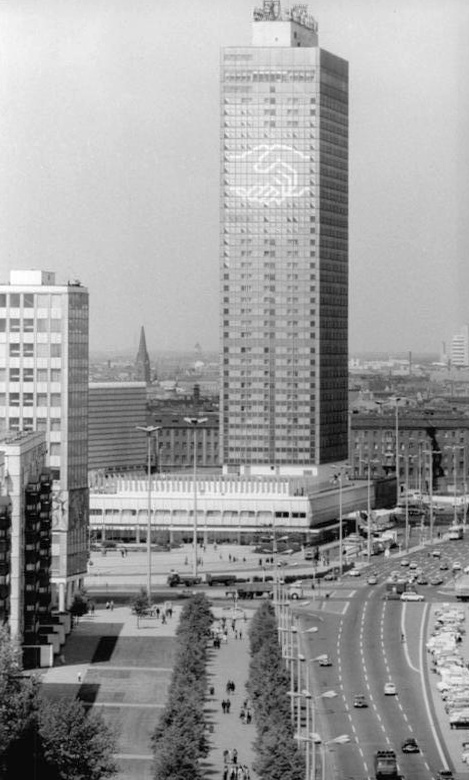
Interhotel Stadt Berlin in 1976, decorated for the 9th SED Party Congress

=== Foundation and early years ===
The complex was built from 1967 to 1970 in the course of the redevelopment of Alexanderplatz when it was located in East Berlin. It was designed by the team of Roland Korn, Heinz Scharlipp and Hans Erich Bogatzky. However, the design as built differs in the shape and location of the tower on the lot from that envisaged in the 1964 plan for redevelopment of the square. The four-star hotel opened as the Hotel Stadt Berlin, part of East Germany's Interhotel chain. There was a panoramic restaurant on the 37th floor and unusually fast elevators for the time.

=== Development after the GDR ===
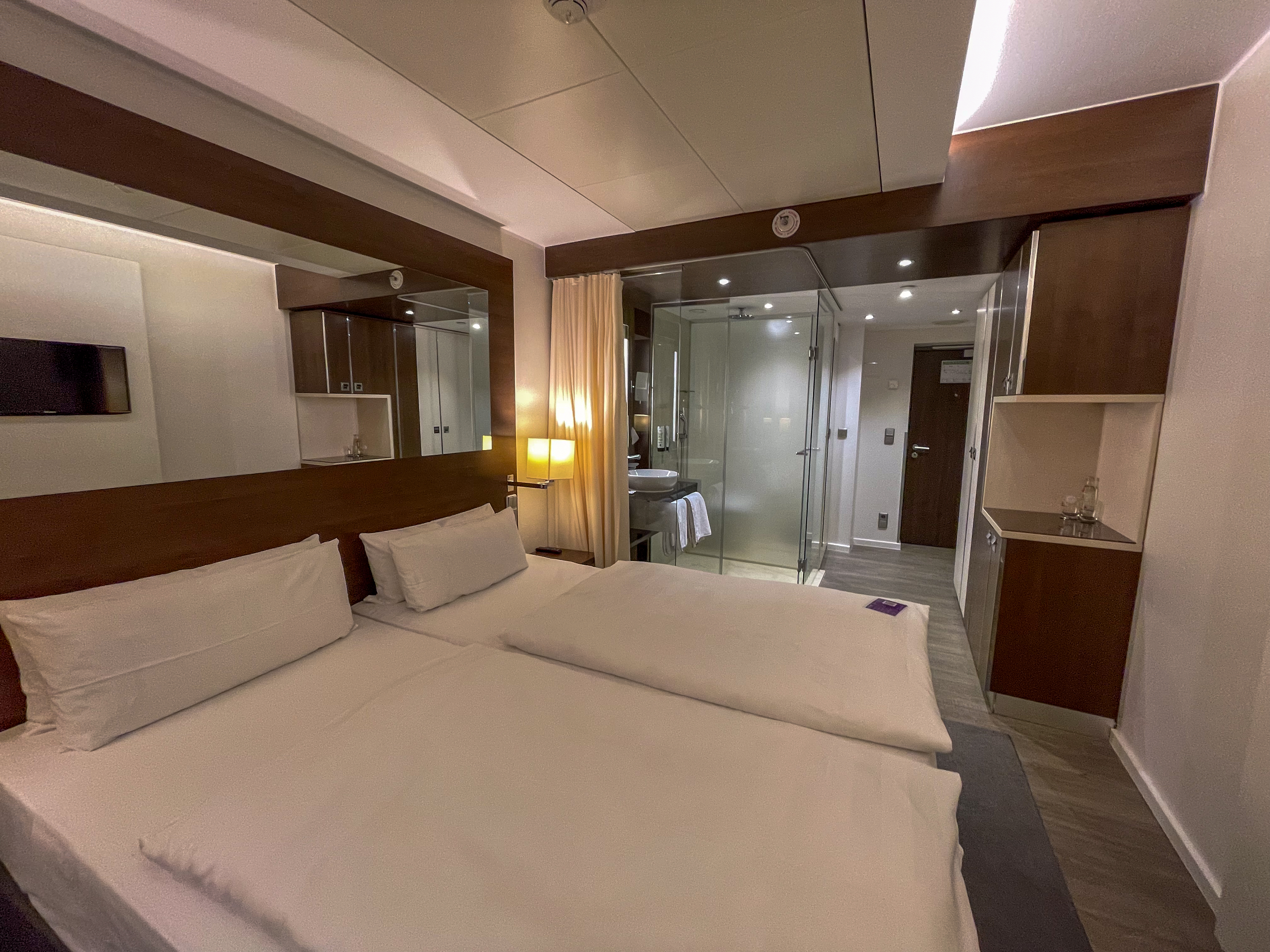
A room in the hotel in 2024

In 1993, after German reunification, it was extensively refurbished and renamed Forum Hotel Berlin, operated by InterContinental Hotels Group .

In 2003, Rezidor Hotel Group became the operator of the hotel, which was renamed Park Inn Berlin-Alexanderplatz and subsequently Park Inn by Radisson Berlin Alexanderplatz. A casino, the highest in Europe, was located in the restaurant until November 2010.

There is a public viewing platform on the roof. All the rooms were refurbished starting in 2001 at a cost of € 20 million. Between May and November 2005 the entire 15,000-square-metre (160,000 sq ft) façade was replaced; the 6,800 new mirror-glass panes cost €3 million. In October 2006, two 35-metre (115 ft) antenna masts were erected on the roof, bringing the total height of the building to 149.5 m (490 ft).

In December 2006 the hotel and the attached real estate parcels were acquired by Blackstone Group.

== Base building ==
The base of the tower rises from a three-story commercial building with its largest tenants being Burger King and Primark amongst some smaller stores. The top floor offers direct access to the adjacent Galeria department store, which had been a Centrum Warenhaus in the GDR. For 15 years, the ground floor and basement levels housed Berlin's first Saturn electronics store (like Galeria, formerly a division of Metro), but in March 2009 this outlet relocated to a new adjacent building.

The future of the hotel and especially the base building are uncertain; plans to rebuild Alexanderplatz drawn up in the early 1990s envisage demolition of the hotel or at a minimum of the base building to enable erection of three new high-rises. As of April 2024, a new high-rise building is under construction directly next to the base building without plans to affect it directly.

== See also ==
- List of tallest buildings in Germany
- List of tallest buildings in Berlin
- List of largest hotels in Europe
- Fernsehturm Berlin
