= Turnham =

Turnham is a surname. Notable people with the surname include:

- Stephen Turnham Pratt, American physicist studying electron-nuclear coupling
- George Albert Turnham (1859–1948), American businessman and politician
- Joe Turnham (born 1959), American politician
- Laura Turnham or Lora Fachie, OBE (born 1988), visually impaired English racing cyclist
- Pete Turnham (1920–2019), American politician

== See also ==
- Turnham Green, public park on Chiswick High Road, Chiswick, London, England, United Kingdom
- Thurnham (disambiguation)

Media related to Turnham at Wikimedia Commons
