= Lafayette Fellowship =

French graduate fellowship program

The Lafayette Fellowship (French: Bourses Lafayette) is a graduate scholarship program in France named for Marquis de Lafayette, awarded to students who completed undergraduate studies in the United States. It provides one year of master's funding and selects 30 fellows per year based on academic excellence; leadership potential and commitment to helping society; and dedication to developing the French-American relationship. Fellows pursue a master's degree at one of 15 partner universities in France.

The program began in July 2026 with the French-American Leadership Program in Paris and Southern France.

== Founding ==
The program was launched in September 2025 by French President Emmanuel Macron as a celebration of the 250th anniversary of the United States Declaration of Independence. The program is the product of a partnership between Villa Albertine (the cultural and educational arm of the French Embassy to the United States), the French Embassy to the United States, and France Science. It was founded by Cultural Counselor and Villa Albertine Director Mohamed Bouabdallah.

The inaugural cohort of 30 fellows was announced in June 2026 from a group of roughly 3,400 applicants and included two students from Harvard, two students from Stanford, two students from the University of California, Santa Barbara, as well as graduates from Yale and Princeton. Fellows were selected by a national jury chaired by French economist and Nobel laureate, Esther Duflo.

== Funding ==
The program is privately funded with founding donors including: French shipping company CMA CGM., the Andrew Carnegie Foundation, the Richard Lounsbery Foundation, Eric Schmidt, Reid Hoffman, Hubert Joly, and Fidji Simo. The fellowship's current budget is around 30 million euros.
