= Long Lake, Minnesota =

City in Minnesota, United States

- City
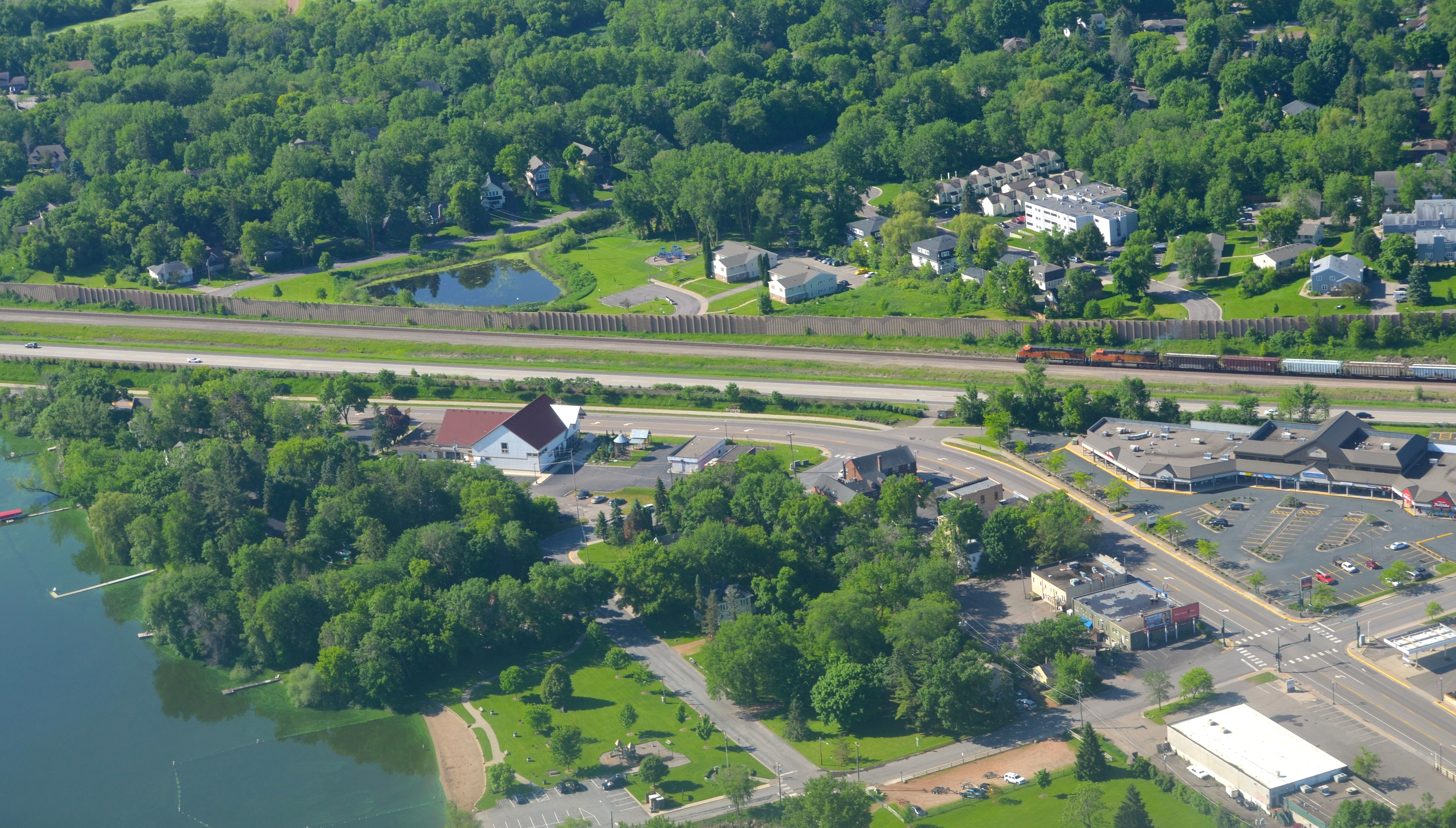
- Long Lake

- Seal

- Location of the city of Long Lake within Hennepin County, Minnesota
- Coordinates: 44°59′5″N 93°34′15″W
- Country: United States
- State: Minnesota
- County: Hennepin

Government
  - Mayor: Charlie Miner

Area
  - Total: 0.95 sq mi (2.46 km^{2})
  - Land: 0.86 sq mi (2.22 km^{2})
  - Water: 0.093 sq mi (0.24 km^{2})
- Elevation: 958 ft (292 m)

Population (2020)
  - Total: 1,741
  - Density: 2,033.6/sq mi (785.18/km^{2})
- Time zone: UTC-6 (Central (CST))
  - Summer (DST): UTC-5 (CDT)
- ZIP code: 55356
- Area code: 952
- FIPS code: 27-38006
- GNIS feature ID: 0647107
- Website: www.longlakemn.gov

Long Lake is a small city in Hennepin County, Minnesota, United States named after the lake the eastern end of town lies on. A commercial hub for the surrounding communities, Long Lake is home to many local shops and businesses. U.S. Highway 12 runs through the town. The population was 1,741 at the 2020 census.

== History ==
The first settlers arrived in Long Lake in early spring, 1855. This early contact in Long Lake did not result in settlement but rather this group of Nova Scotians came down Watertown Road, walked to the lake, looked across the lake and settled on the north side of the lake in what is now Orono. The first permanent settlement was established in May 1855 with the arrival of the Flemings and the George Knettles from Cumberland County, Pennsylvania. This first settlement was named Cumberland Town and consisted of a saw mill, general store and schoolhouse. The platted area Cumberland Addition can trace its roots to this early period. The Knettle's house became a favorite stop for travelers between 1855 and 1860 and is the location of the first public religious service in the community. The first post office was established in 1856, which was named Tamarack in recognition of the Tamarack swamps in the western part of the country.

A significant aspect of the early settlement of Long Lake was the relationship between the Dakota, the Chippewa and the settlers. The origin of the Union Cemetery is found in this tripartite relationship. The area where the cemetery is located was called Teepee Hill in these early years. It served as an encampment for the Chippewa in 1859–1860. The Dakota were informed of the location of the Chippewa through two settlers in the area. This information prompted many of the Dakota to be in and around Long Lake. Although there was no fighting and the actual intentions of the Dakota are not clear, their presence in the area forced the Chippewa to vacate Teepee Hill. This area was acquired by Bradford Wakefield, most probably through adverse possession, and purchased by Union Cemetery Association in 1861. There was concern among the settlers that the Chippewa would return, so by establishing a cemetery (hallowed ground) it was unlikely that any Native American people would choose that site as an encampment, thus assuring the safety of the surrounding area.

During the middle to late 19th century, Long Lake developed like many other towns. A sawmill was erected (1866), the railroad reached Long Lake (1868), a school district was organized (1869), a general store was started (1870), the Freethinkers Hall was organized (1874), a flour mill was established (1875), and a hotel was added (1875). These institutions were all-important elements to early town development in the Upper Midwest.

The late 1890s – early 1900s became known as the berry years in Long Lake. The Minnesota Fruit Growers Association was established in Long Lake in 1898 to focus on promoting strawberry and raspberry production. These products became a regional specialty with shipments going as far as Fargo and Grand Forks, North Dakota.

The catalyst for the expansion of the city limits was a desire by Long Lake's neighbors to take advantage of the city's decision to install a sewer system. Those areas that wanted to be connected to city sewer were annexed by the city.

== Geography ==
According to the United States Census Bureau, the city has a total area of 0.93 square miles (2.41 km^{2}), of which 0.83 square miles (2.15 km^{2}) is land and 0.10 square miles (0.26 km^{2}) is water.

West Wayzata Boulevard (Old Highway 12), now Hennepin County Road 112, and U.S. Highway 12 both serve as the main routes in the community.

== Demographics ==
Historical population
Census	Pop.	Note	%±
1880	150		—
1910	161		—
1920	148		−8.1%
1930	207		39.9%
1940	260		25.6%
1950	399		53.5%
1960	996		149.6%
1970	1,506		51.2%
1980	1,747		16.0%
1990	1,984		13.6%
2000	1,842		−7.2%
2010	1,768		−4.0%
2020	1,741		−1.5%
U.S. Decennial Census

=== 2020 census ===
As of the 2020 census, Long Lake had a population of 1,741. The median age was 42.6 years. 24.9% of residents were under the age of 18 and 17.1% of residents were 65 years of age or older. For every 100 females there were 102.2 males, and for every 100 females age 18 and over there were 100.5 males age 18 and over.

100.0% of residents lived in urban areas, while 0.0% lived in rural areas.

There were 737 households in Long Lake, of which 34.3% had children under the age of 18 living in them. Of all households, 48.4% were married-couple households, 22.4% were households with a male householder and no spouse or partner present, and 25.0% were households with a female householder and no spouse or partner present. About 32.7% of all households were made up of individuals and 13.4% had someone living alone who was 65 years of age or older.

There were 771 housing units, of which 4.4% were vacant. The homeowner vacancy rate was 0.2% and the rental vacancy rate was 2.9%.

Racial composition as of the 2020 census
Race	Number	Percent
White	1,527	87.7%
Black or African American	19	1.1%
American Indian and Alaska Native	4	0.2%
Asian	32	1.8%
Native Hawaiian and Other Pacific Islander	0	0.0%
Some other race	52	3.0%
Two or more races	107	6.1%
Hispanic or Latino (of any race)	96	5.5%

=== 2010 census ===
As of the census of 2010, there were 1,768 people, 732 households, and 482 families residing in the city. The population density was 2,130.1 inhabitants per square mile (822.4/km^{2}). There were 765 housing units at an average density of 921.7 per square mile (355.9/km^{2}). The racial makeup of the city was 93.2% White, 1.3% African American, 0.3% Native American, 1.2% Asian, 0.1% Pacific Islander, 1.8% from other races, and 2.2% from two or more races. Hispanic or Latino of any race were 4.0% of the population.

There were 732 households, of which 31.0% had children under the age of 18 living with them, 50.7% were married couples living together, 10.4% had a female householder with no husband present, 4.8% had a male householder with no wife present, and 34.2% were non-families. 29.0% of all households were made up of individuals, and 8.7% had someone living alone who was 65 years of age or older. The average household size was 2.38 and the average family size was 2.93.

The median age in the city was 42 years. 23.9% of residents were under the age of 18; 5.6% were between the ages of 18 and 24; 24.7% were from 25 to 44; 34.3% were from 45 to 64; and 11.5% were 65 years of age or older. The gender makeup of the city was 49.9% male and 50.1% female.

=== 2000 census ===
As of the census of 2000, there were 1,842 people, 756 households, and 504 families residing in the city. The population density was 2,177.1 inhabitants per square mile (840.6/km^{2}). There were 764 housing units at an average density of 903.0 per square mile (348.7/km^{2}). The racial makeup of the city was 96.63% White, 1.30% African American, 0.05% Native American, 0.49% Asian, 0.49% from other races, and 1.03% from two or more races. Hispanic or Latino of any race were 1.14% of the population.

There were 756 households, out of which 33.1% had children under the age of 18 living with them, 53.6% were married couples living together, 10.2% had a female householder with no husband present, and 33.3% were non-families. 27.2% of all households were made up of individuals, and 6.0% had someone living alone who was 65 years of age or older. The average household size was 2.38 and the average family size was 2.90.

In the city, the age distribution of the population shows 24.6% under the age of 18, 6.0% from 18 to 24, 33.1% from 25 to 44, 25.1% from 45 to 64, and 11.2% who were 65 years of age or older. The median age was 38 years. For every 100 females, there were 97.9 males. For every 100 females age 18 and over, there were 94.1 males.

The median income for a household in the city was $55,139, and the median income for a family was $64,063. Males had a median income of $44,327 versus $31,058 for females. The per capita income for the city was $28,385. About 5.0% of families and 6.8% of the population were below the poverty line, including 11.8% of those under age 18 and 5.3% of those age 65 or over.

== Education ==
It is in the Orono Public School District.

== Notable people ==
- Marilyn Carlson Nelson, businesswoman, co-owner of Carlson Companies
- Jeff Dayton, musician
- Mark Dayton, U.S. Senator, Governor of Minnesota
- Melissa Keller, model
- Jon Leuer, National Basketball Association player
- George Albert Turnham, businessman and politician
