= Hubert Joly =

French businessman and corporate director

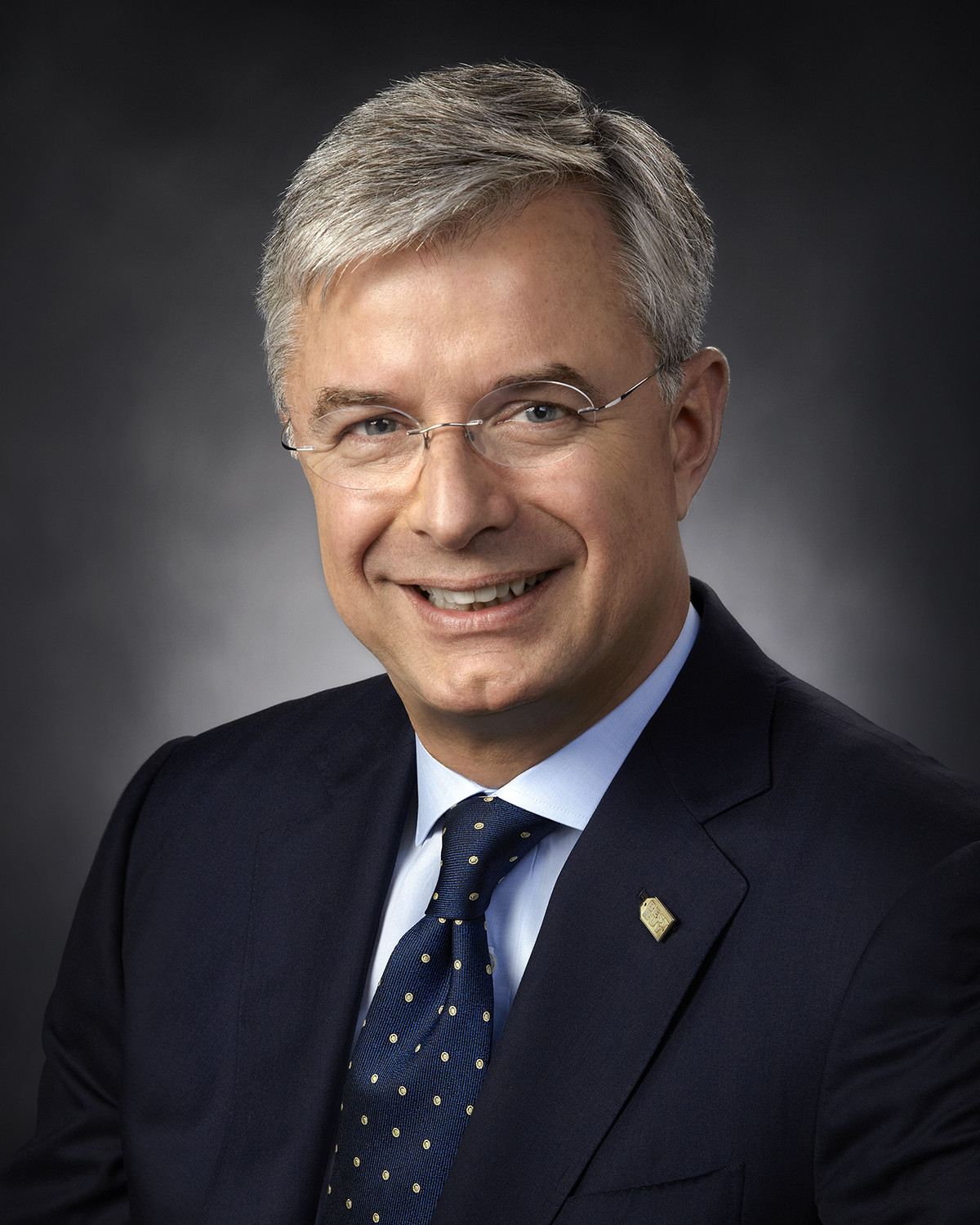
- Born: 11 August 1959 (age 67); Nancy, France
- Education: HEC Paris; Sciences Po
- Occupations: Harvard Business School Professor; Former Chairman and CEO of Best Buy

Hubert Joly (born 11 August 1959) is a businessman and Harvard Business School faculty member who formerly was chairman and CEO of Best Buy. He is also the former president, CEO and director of Carlson, a global hospitality and travel conglomerate based in Minneapolis, Minnesota, US.

He graduated from HEC Paris and Sciences Po Paris (1983).

== Career ==
Joly left Vivendi in 2004 to become president and chief executive officer of CWT. Under his leadership, CWT grew its annual sales from US$8.9 billion in 2003 to $25.5 billion in 2007.. In January 2008, Joly was announced president and CEO of Carlson Companies, an American privately held international conglomerate in the hotel, travel and restaurant franchise industries, employing more than 190,000 people in more than 160 countries and territories. He took the position in March 2008 as a replacement for Marilyn Carlson Nelson, daughter of the founder Curt Carlson.

On August 17, 2012, Joly resigned from his position with Carlson to take the position of CEO at Best Buy. Under Joly and his Renew Blue transformation at Best Buy, the company's stock tripled in 2013 with the focus on banking on big box stores, superior customer service, product selection, and services like the Geek Squad. According to The New York Times, Joly's top goal is matching the lowest price, determined to make sure that a customer who came to Best Buy as a showroom has no reason to buy anywhere else. "The strategy is very simple,” he told the New York Times in 2012, soon after he took the job. “We believe that price-competitiveness is table stakes. The way we want to win is around the advice, convenience, service.”

On January 20, 2017, a report in the Brazilian newspaper Valor Economico stated Joly was being considered for the CEO post at Carrefour. Joly issued a statement: “There have been reports that I am being considered for a CEO role at another company. Let me be clear, I am fully committed to Best Buy’s continued transformation and have absolutely no plans to leave.”

Joly stepped down as CEO of Best Buy in June 2019 to become Executive Chairman of the company. In June 2020, Joly stepped down as Executive Chairman and began teaching at Harvard Business School as a Senior Lecturer of Business Administration. He remains an advisor to Best Buy's CEO and Board of Directors.

Joly is the author of The Heart of Business: Leadership Principles for the Next Era of Capitalism, which was published by Harvard Business Review on May 4, 2021. The book debuted #3 on The Wall Street Journal's Business Bestseller List, then hit #10 the week after. It is also #126 on the USA Today list of Bestselling Books.

== Additional roles ==
In addition to teaching at Harvard Business School, he is on the board of directors for Best Buy, Johnson & Johnson, and Ralph Lauren. He is also a member and former chair of the board of trustees of the Minneapolis Institute of Arts.

He formerly was a member of the Travel and Tourism Advisory Board, established in 2003 to advise the United States Department of Commerce, as well as the executive committee of the World Travel and Tourism Council.

Along with making numerous public speeches, including as Harvard Business School Executive Education guest speaker, Joly has appeared in such publications as Fortune, CBS News, Inc., CNN Business, and CNBC.

== Honors ==
Joly was elected a Global Leader for Tomorrow by the World Economic Forum (Davos, 1997–1999) and honored as one of the 25 Most Influential Executives of the Business Travel Industry (2006 and 2009) by Business Travel News magazine. He was voted #10 on the 2018 Top 100 Highest Rated CEOs on Glassdoor, moving up from #77 in 2017. In 2018, Joly was selected as one of the "World's Best CEOs" by Barron's and one of the "Best-Performing CEOs in the World" by Harvard Business Review.

Joly is a Knight in the French National Order of Merit and in 2017 he was further awarded the French National Order of the Legion of Honour (Ordre national de la Légion d'Honneur), the highest decoration in France for civil merit.
