= Rezidor Hotel Group =

Swedish-Belgian hotel group company

Rezidor Hotel Group AB
- Formerly: SAS International Hotels; Rezidor SAS Hospitality
- Company type: listed Subsidiary
- Traded as: Nasdaq Stockholm: REZT
- ISIN: SE0001857533
- Industry: Hospitality
Founded
1960 in Copenhagen	(first hotel of SAS Group)
1985 in Sweden	(as subsidiary)
2006 in Sweden	(as listed company)
- Founder: SAS Group
- Defunct: 2018
- Fate: Renamed as Radisson Hospitality AB (part of Radisson Hotel Group)
- Successor: Radisson Hospitality AB
Headquarters
Stockholm, Sweden	(registered office)
Brussels, Belgium	(de facto)
- Number of locations: ▲369 hotels (2017)
- Area served: 78 countries of the world
Key people
辛笛; 'Xin Di'	(Chairman)
Federico J. González Tejera	(President and CEO)
- Services: Lodging
- Revenue: ▲€967 million (2017)
- Operating income: ▲€15 million (2017)
- Net income: ▼€4 million (2017)
- Total assets: ▲€513 million (2017)
- Total equity: ▼€254 million (2017)
- Owner: Carlson Hotels, Inc. (69.7%)
- Number of employees: ▼5,033 (2017)
- Parent: Carlson Hotels, Inc.; (trading as Carlson Rezidor Hotel Group)
- Rating: B1 (Moody's, June 2018)
- Website: rezidor.com
- Footnotes / references source: annual report (consolidated financial statements and other pages)

Rezidor Hotel Group AB, originally SAS International Hotels A/S and then Rezidor SAS Hospitality A/S, Rezidor SAS Hospitality Group AB (publ), was a listed hotel group company. Originally founded by Scandinavian conglomerate SAS Group as a hotel in 1960, it became a listed company in 2006. The global headquarters of Rezidor relocated to Brussels, Belgium, circa 1989. The listed company managed hotel chains under brands such as Radisson SAS (now Radisson Blu), Park Inn, and Country Inns & Suites. The brands were franchised from American hospitality and travel conglomerate Carlson Companies from 1994 (the Radisson brand) and 2002 (the other brands) respectively. In 2005, Carlson Companies acquired 25% of the shares of Rezidor Hotel Group from SAS Group. In 2007, SAS Group ceased to be a shareholder of the company.

In 2010, Carlson Companies acquired control (more than 50.1% shares) of the listed company. In 2012, Rezidor Hotel Group started to integrate with the direct parent company (Carlson Hotels, Inc.), with both companies collectively known as Carlson Rezidor Hotel Group. Carlson Rezidor was one of the top hotel corporations in 2013. Carlson Hotels, Inc. and its subsidiaries, including Rezidor Hotel Group, were sold to Chinese conglomerate HNA Group in 2016. Rezidor Hotel Group AB was then renamed to Radisson Hospitality AB. The direct parent company (Carlson Hotels, Inc.) became Radisson Hospitality, Inc., and the whole hotel group received a new trading name – Radisson Hotel Group. In 2018, Radisson Hotel Group was re-sold to a consortium led by Jin Jiang International of China.

== History ==
=== Predecessors ===
SAS Group, the flag carrier of Scandinavian countries, opened their first hotel in Copenhagen, Denmark in 1960. The hotel, the SAS Royal Hotel, was the world's first designer hotel, which was designed by Arne Jacobsen. The hotel was initially under the catering division of the group. The hospitality and catering division then became SAS Catering and Hotels. In 1982, the hotels were spin-off as a separate division. It became a subsidiary known as SAS International Hotels in 1985.

Future President and chief executive officer (CEO) of SAS International Hotels, Kurt Ritter, joined the company as a junior manager in 1976. He was promoted as the president and CEO in 1989. According to the Financial Times, he "lays claim to several innovations [in the hospitality business]". He also struck a franchise deal for the company with Carlson Hotels in 1995, [sic] which made SAS International Hotels had "a decade of compound annual growth north of 20 per cent".

=== Rezidor SAS Hospitality ===
Rezidor SAS Hospitality, was a company headquartered in Brussels, Belgium. As of January 2005, it was a wholly owned subsidiary of SAS Group. The subsidiary was known as SAS International Hotels until 2001. The headquarters of the subsidiary was relocated to Brussels soon after Ritter became President & CEO of the subsidiary in 1989.

In April 2005, Rezidor SAS signed a partnership agreement with Carlson Hotels Worldwide, a subsidiary of Carlson Companies. The agreement included Carlson acquired 25% shares of Rezidor SAS, as well as Rezidor SAS acquired the rights to use the Carlson-owned brands, such as Radisson SAS, Park Inn, Regent and Country Inns & Suites, in the Europe, the Middle East and Africa (EMEA) markets. Rezidor SAS, at that time known as SAS International Hotels, signed a similar agreement in 1994 (1995 according to the Financial Times and Rezidor themselves) with Radisson Hotels International, another subsidiary of Carlson Companies. That agreement give birth of the hotel chain Radisson SAS. Radisson SAS was known as Radisson Blu since 2009. The franchise agreement was renewed in 2002, which added three more brands: Park Inn, Regent and Country Inn in the new agreement.

In February 2005, Rezidor signed an agreement to convert seven former Holiday Inn hotels in Germany to Park Inn: Park Inn Bochum, Park Inn Dortmund-City Centre, Park Inn Düsseldorf/Kaarst, Park Inn Hanover, Park Inn Kamen/Unna, Park Inn Köln-Belfortstraße (Park Inn Cologne-Belfortstrasse) and Park Inn Cologne City-West. However, six of the aforementioned hotels, except Cologne City-West, were converted to Mercure brand of AccorHotels in 2014.

In 2005, Rezidor SAS opened four more Radisson hotels in the Republic of Ireland. Two Park Inn hotels were also opened in Dundalk and Mulranny respectively in the same year. However, Park Inn Dundalk was closed down in 2010. The former Park Inn Dundalk was under Ramada brand of Wyndham Hotels and managed by another company Lester Hotels since 2016.

In February 2006, Rezidor opened a Park Inn hotel in Baku, the first Park Inn hotel in the Commonwealth of Independent States.

=== Rezidor Hotel Group ===
In 2006, SAS Group floated Rezidor SAS Hospitality as Rezidor Hotel Group AB (publ) on the Stockholm Stock Exchange. The listed company is incorporated in Sweden. After the listing, as of 2007, SAS Group ceased to be a shareholder of Rezidor Hotel Group, while Carlson Hotels Worldwide owned about 42% shares.

In the 2010s, Rezidor Hotel Group became part of a larger hotel group, which trading as Carlson Rezidor Hotel Group. Carlson Hotels increased its ownership ratio of the Rezidor Hotel Group to 50.1% in 2010 and then integrating the two hotel groups. In January 2012, it was announced that Carlson hotel group and Rezidor hotel group would runs hotels under one name Carlson Rezidor Hotel Group. In 2010, Carlson and Rezidor had already sold the brand Regent to Formosa International Hotels. The enlarged group, Carlson Rezidor Hotel Group, was one of the top hotel corporations in 2013.

Carlson–Rezidor group was acquired by Chinese conglomerate HNA Group, via their division, HNA Tourism Group, in 2016 from Carlson Companies. The takeover also triggered a mandatory bid for the remaining shares of the listed company. However, HNA Group re-sold Carlson–Rezidor group to a consortium led by Jin Jiang International Holdings, another Chinese conglomerate.

In May 2018, Rezidor Hotel Group, the listed company, was renamed to Radisson Hospitality AB (publ); The Belgian subsidiary, was renamed to Radisson Hospitality Belgium SPRL/BVBA; The parent company, Carlson Hotels, Inc., was renamed to Radisson Hospitality, Inc. in the fourth quarter of 2017. The trading name of the whole hotel group, including both Radisson Hospitality AB and Radisson Hospitality, Inc., was renamed Radisson Hotel Group.
