= Park Plaza Westminster Bridge =

Hotel in London

Park Plaza Westminster Bridge London
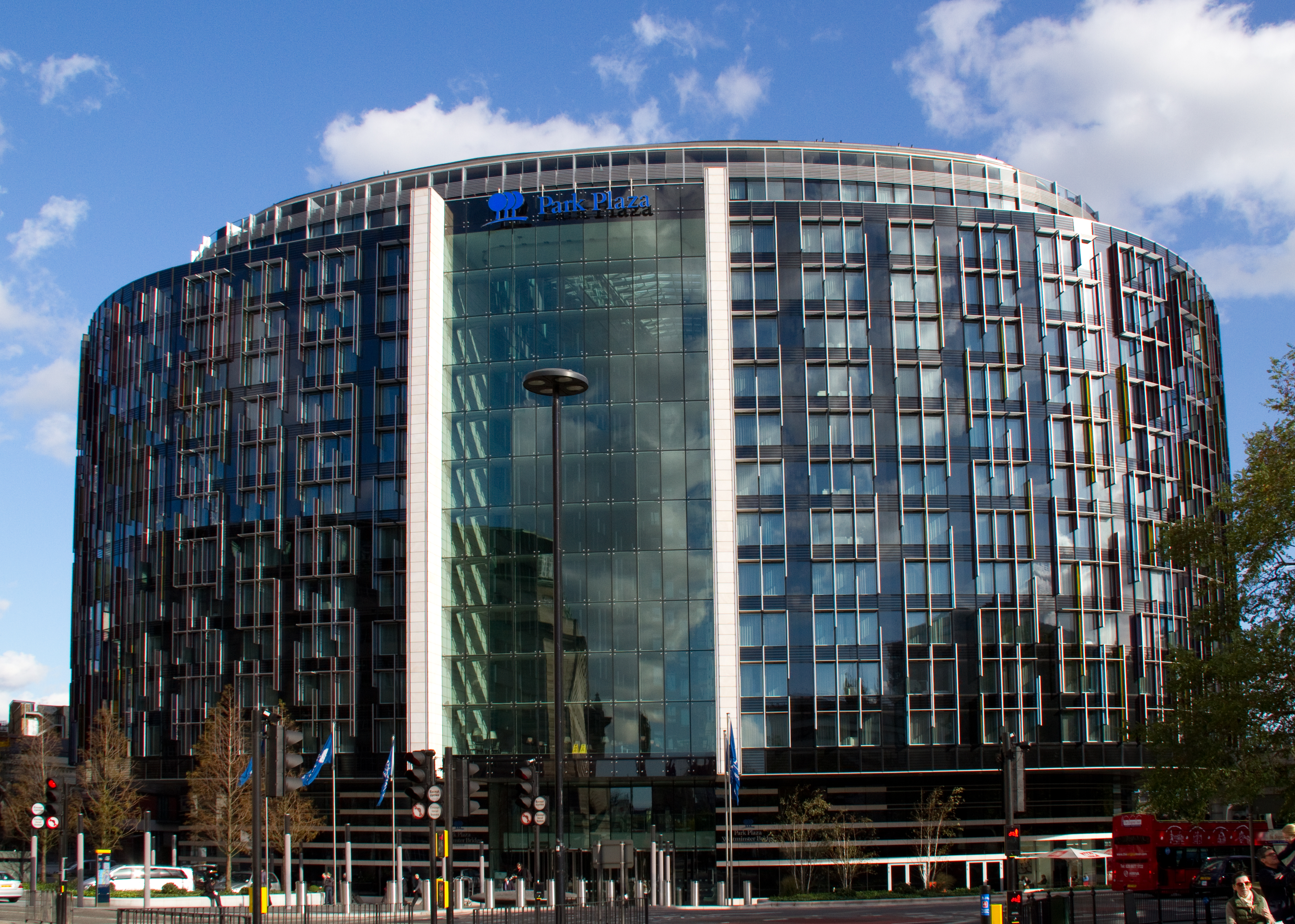
- Interactive map of the Park Plaza Westminster Bridge London area
- Hotel chain: Park Plaza Hotels & Resorts

General information
- Location: 200 Westminster Bridge Road, London, SE1 7UT, United Kingdom
- Coordinates: 51°30′03″N 0°07′00″W
- Opened: 1 March 2010
- Management: PPHE Hotel Group

Other information
- Number of rooms: 1,019
- Number of suites: 63
- Number of restaurants: 2
- Number of bars: 1

Website
- www.parkplazawestminsterbridge.com

The Park Plaza Westminster Bridge is a hotel at 200 Westminster Bridge Road in London with 1,023 bedrooms.

It was designed by BUJ architects, Uri Blumenthal architects and Digital Space, and was built on the site of the County Hall Island Block, an annex of London County Hall, that was demolished in 2006. The building, also known as No 1 Westminster Bridge Road, had been disused since 1986 and had become derelict, being described by the BBC as "one of London's most hated eyesores".

The hotel had over 840 investors. During the topping out celebration on 21 July 2009, Boris Johnson, the mayor of London, secured the last beam in place.

The hotel opened on 1 March 2010 and cost £350 million. It is part of the PPHE Hotel Group.

The Times's Mystery Guest thought the hotel looked like a huge bowling ball. The reviewer found the hotel to be "claustrophobic" and to have background music that was overwhelming. Food critic Giles Coren of The Times called the hotel a "hulking carbuncstrosity" that is "self-besplattered with enormous bill posters". Diva reviewer Lotte Jeffs thought it had "all the inconspicuousness of a big city chain hotel" and liked its "stylish flourishes and designer details". Jessica Phillips of Time Out said it "caters to the masses" and has "deliberate" minimalism. According to The Daily Telegraph reviewer Francesca Syz, the hotel is "futuristic" and gave an unobstructed sightline of Westminster Bridge.
