= Park Building =

Park Building may refer to:

- Park Building (Cleveland, Ohio), historic commercial building
- Park Building (Worcester, Massachusetts), historic apartment building
- Park Building, the central administration building of the University of Utah
- Park Building, a building of Somerville College, Oxford

== See also ==
- Multi-storey car park
- Park Plaza
