= Victoria Hotel, Amsterdam =

Hotel in Amsterdam

Coordinates: 52.3769°N 4.8978°E

Victoria Hotel
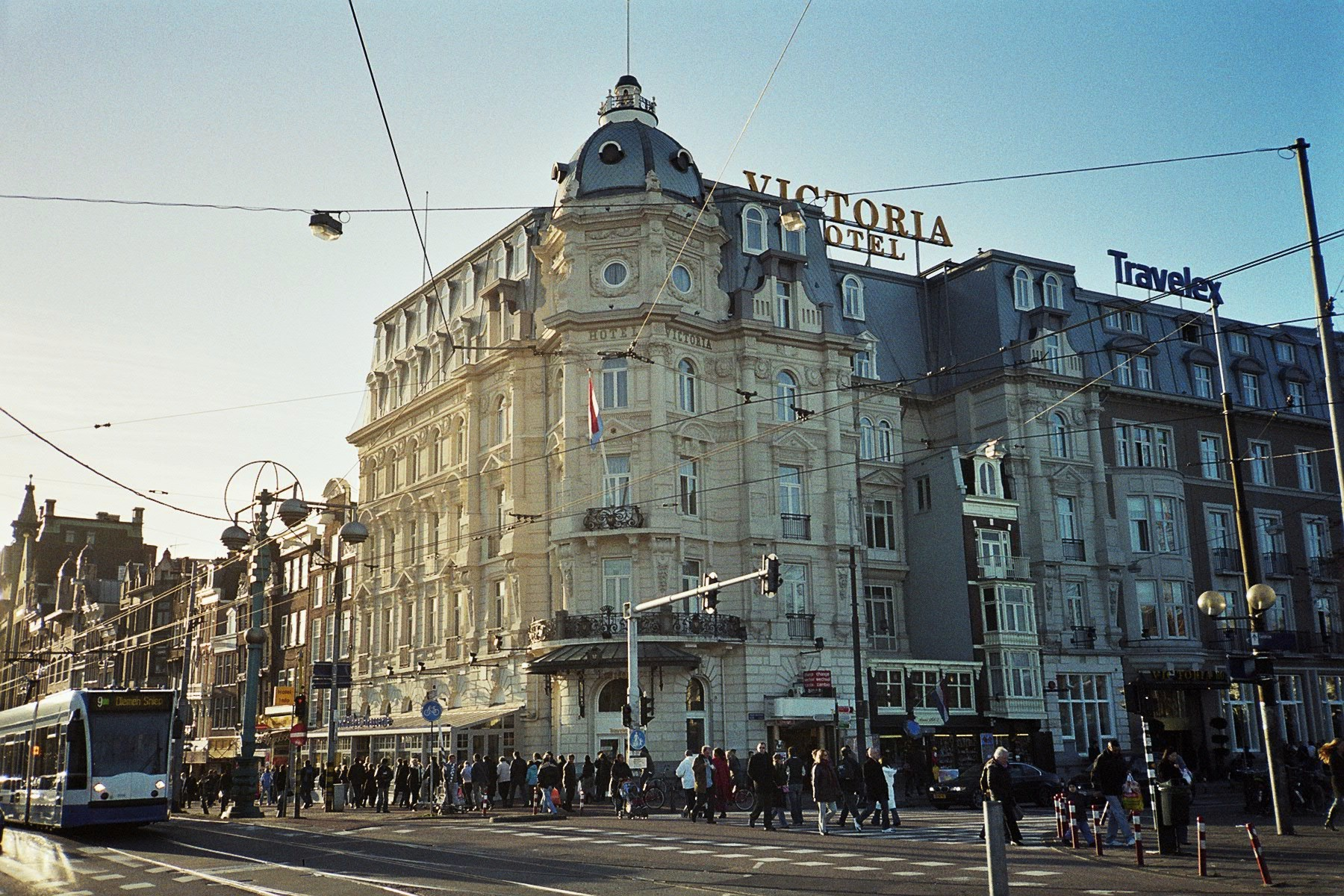
- Interactive map of the Victoria Hotel area
- Hotel chain: Park Plaza Hotels & Resorts

General information
- Location: Amsterdam, Netherlands
- Opened: 19 August 1890
- Owner: PPHE Hotel Group
- Management: PPHE Hotel Group

Design and construction
- Architect: Johann Friedrich Henkenhaf
- Developer: Palace Hotel Company

The Victoria Hotel is a major hotel in Amsterdam, Netherlands. It is on the corner of the Damrak and Prins Hendrikkade, close to Amsterdam Centraal station. The Victoria Hotel is one of the oldest hotels in The Netherlands.

The hotel opened on 19 August 1890 and was designed by J.F. Henkenhaf. It was the first hotel in the country to have electric lighting. During the years it has attracted well-known clientele, including Billy Graham, Louis Armstrong, Zarah Leander, Fats Domino, Glenda Jackson and more recently Katy Perry, Anastacia, Marilyn Manson and Iron Maiden.

The building is designed around two older properties, Nos. 45 - 47 Prins Hendrikkade, that the hotel was unable to purchase owing to high prices. This idiosyncrasy was explored in the book and subsequent film Publieke werken (Public Works). The film is also known as A Noble Intention (2015).

On 13 July 2001, the Rijksdienst voor het Cultureel Erfgoed selected the Victoria hotel as a National heritage site.
