= Murder of Blair Adams =

1996 death near Knoxville, Tennessee, United States

Blair Adams
- Born: Robert Dennis Blair Adams; December 28, 1964; Surrey, British Columbia, Canada
- Died: July 11, 1996 (aged 31); 7471 Crosswood Boulevard, East Knox County, Tennessee, U.S.
- Cause of death: Abdominal perforation
- Resting place: Victory Memorial Park, British Columbia, Canada
- Known for: Murder victim

Robert Dennis Blair Adams (December 28, 1964 – July 11, 1996) was a Canadian man found murdered in a parking lot of an under-construction hotel off Interstate 40 outside of Knoxville, Tennessee, United States. His murder remains unsolved.

== Timeline ==
=== Prior to the murder ===
On July 5, 1996, Blair Adams, a resident of Surrey, British Columbia, Canada, withdrew most of his money from his bank account and emptied his safe deposit box of cash, jewelry, gold, and platinum. He then attempted to enter the United States via ferry from Victoria, British Columbia, to Seattle, Washington. Immigration officials flagged Adams as a possible drug courier due to the large amount of cash he had with him. Once he was found to have convictions on drug and assault charges he was denied entry.

In the early morning hours of July 9, Adams was discovered by Canadian border patrol officers attempting to cross the border on foot at the Pacific Highway Border Crossing. Officials noted Adams had scratches covering his legs and hands. Adams matched the description of a man implicated in an automobile theft, and the vehicle had been discovered abandoned near the Pacific Highway Border Crossing; however, he denied involvement and was freed on lack of evidence.

==== Entrance to the United States ====
Adams managed to enter the U.S. by car on July 9 via a Nissan Altima he rented from the Vancouver International Airport. He arrived in Seattle, where he then purchased a roundtrip ticket to Frankfurt, Germany, at the Seattle–Tacoma International Airport. Adams had previously worked on a project in Frankfurt for his stepfather's construction company; he had also dated a German woman in Frankfurt, though she later told law enforcement he had never contacted her about visiting. However, Adams subsequently forwent the flight to Frankfurt, and instead traded his credit for a one-way ticket to Washington, D.C. Upon arriving, he rented a Toyota Camry at Dulles Airport around 6:45 am. Later that morning, on U.S. Route 250 in Troy, Virginia, Adams backed his car into another motorist's vehicle, causing minor damage. The driver of the car told detectives that Adams "seemed nice, but was in a hurry."

Adams arrived in East Knox County, Tennessee, between Knoxville and Strawberry Plains sometime on the evening of July 10, approximately 500 miles (800 km) southwest of Washington, D.C. The first reported sighting of Adams in Knoxville occurred at a BP gas station at Strawberry Plains Pike at 5:30 pm. Gerald Sapp, an Interstate Repair Service driver, had been called to the gas station; Adams had told the clerk there that he was having difficulty with his car key and was unable to enter the vehicle. When Sapp arrived, he realized that the key Adams had attempted to use was for that of a Nissan (the vehicle he had abandoned in Seattle) not the Toyota he was driving. Sapp recalled: "I asked him to look in his pockets. I said, ‘If you drove this thing up here, you gotta have another key in your pockets.’ And he wouldn’t look. So I thought he was nuts. He was bound and determined that he had the key he needed for that car." Sapp arranged to have the car towed to a local repair shop, and dropped Adams off at a Fairfield Inn in Knoxville on Cracker Barrel Lane.

Upon his arrival at the Fairfield Inn, Adams was captured on closed-circuit television footage in the hotel lobby. He spent around forty minutes loitering at the hotel before purchasing a room with US$100; when the hotel clerk attempted to return his change, Adams exited the lobby and walked outside. It was later determined he never entered the room he purchased.

=== Discovery of body ===
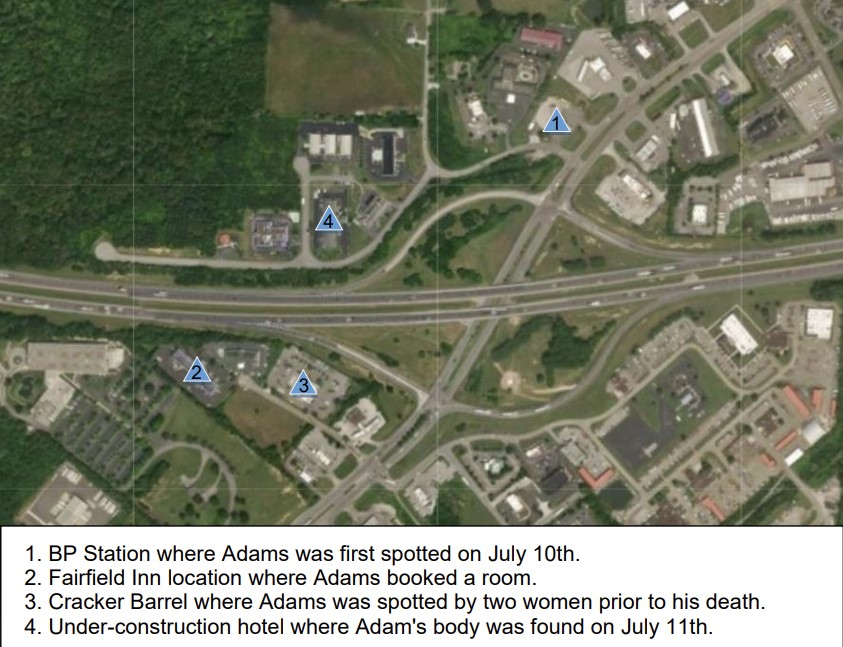
Aerial imagery of the Strawberry Plains Pike interchange with labels of locations where Adams was spotted, and found.

Adams was discovered by construction workers around 7:30 a.m. on July 11, 1996, in a parking lot of an under-construction Country Inn & Suites hotel at 7471 Crosswood Boulevard, which was on the other side of the Strawberry Plains Pike-Interstate 40 interchange across from the Fairfield Inn where Adams had booked a room. Adams was found "half-naked" with his pants off and shirt open. His pants, shoes, and socks were lying near his body. Scattered around his body was German, Canadian, and U.S. currency totaling nearly $4,000. In addition to the money found with the body, police also located a black duffel bag which contained maps and travel receipts and a fanny pack which held 5 troy ounces (160 g) of gold bars, gold and platinum coins, jewelry, keys and a pair of sunglasses.

According to an autopsy report by the University of Tennessee Medical Center, Adams had sustained many cuts and abrasions. The Knox County Sheriff’s Department has speculated some of the wounds came from fending off an attack. Adams also suffered a violent blow that ruptured his stomach. His official cause of death was ruled sepsis stemming from an abdominal perforation. He also had a wound to his forehead, which police determined was caused by a crowbar or a club. Other injuries indicated that Adams had been sexually assaulted.

== Investigation ==
Law enforcement initially suggested the possibility that Adams's death had been "sex-related" since he was almost entirely nude when discovered. The only physical DNA evidence found at the scene was one strand of long hair that was gripped in Adams's hand. According to subsequent interviews with his mother, Adams had been acting oddly in the weeks prior to his leaving Canada, though she said Adams refused to tell her what was bothering him. According to friends and family, Adams had been sober for two years at the time of his death and had recently stopped attending Alcoholics Anonymous meetings. He also allegedly told friends that someone was trying to kill him, and confided in his mother that "someone had been spreading rumors" about him.

In a 2010 interview with local law enforcement, it was revealed that the Knoxville Police Department had "never received a credible tip" in Adams's death, though a composite sketch of a man was released in the case; the sketch was of an unknown man two women claimed to have witnessed Adams speaking to outside a Cracker Barrel restaurant near the Fairfield Inn he was staying in.

== Media coverage ==
This case has been the subject of several episodes of television shows and true crime podcasts, including a 1997 episode of the show Unsolved Mysteries, and episodes of the podcasts My Favorite Murder, Crime Junkie, and CreepTime the Podcast.

As a part of a larger series of videos on true crime, the case was also the focus of a YouTube video by French Youtuber Squeezie.
