= Radisson Red =

International hotel chain

- Type: Brand
- Industry: Hospitality, Hotels, Tourism
- Founded: 2015; 11 years ago
- Number of locations: 21 (2024)
- Area served: Worldwide
- Parent: Radisson Hotel Group; Choice Hotels
- Website: www.choicehotels.com/radisson-red www.radissonhotels.com/en-us/brand/radisson-red

Radisson Red (stylized as Radisson RED) is an international chain of full-service hotels operated by Choice Hotels International in the Americas and Radisson Hotel Group in the rest of the world. Radisson Red is an upscale hotel with emphasis on modern design and technology. As of 2019, the brand has twenty-three hotels either in operation or under development.

== History ==
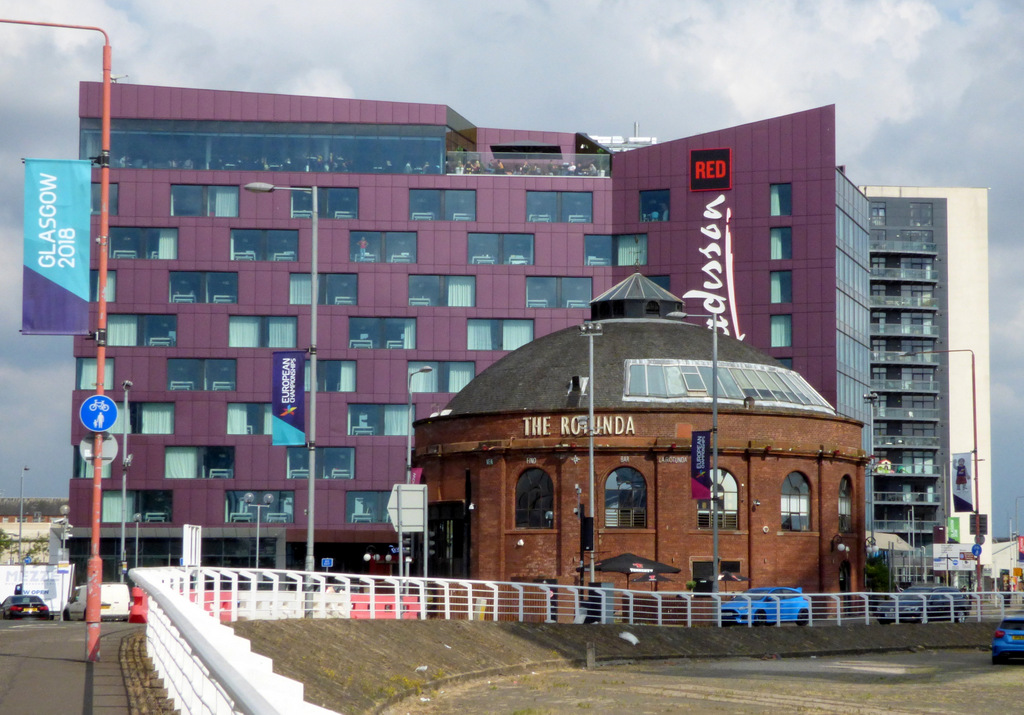
Radisson RED in Glasgow

Radisson Red was launched by Carlson Rezidor in 2015 along with the brand Quorvus Collection, the first brands launched by the company since 1987. Initial plans were to launch 60 Radisson Red hotels by 2020 with the first opening in Brussels, Belgium on April 18, 2016.

The first Radisson Red in the United States opened in 2016 in Minneapolis, Minnesota with a second U.S. location in Portland, Oregon (Radisson RED Portland Downtown; now operating as Hotel Vance, Portland, a Tribute Portfolio Hotel) in November 2018. It continued its expansion with a hotel in Campinas, Brazil in August 2017, Cape Town, South Africa in September 2017, and Glasgow, United Kingdom on April 30, 2018. As of 2019, the brand had twenty-three hotels either in operation or under development.

In early 2024, Radisson Red inaugurated its first property in Germany by rebranding and refurbishing a former Park Plaza in Berlin.

A Radisson Red to be attached to Edgbaston Cricket Ground, Birmingham, United Kingdom via the demolition and rebuilding of two stands, is currently under construction. It is due to be completed in 2027 and open in time for the 2027 Men’s Ashes against Australia.

== Concept ==
Radisson Red is targeted to guests with an "ageless millenial mindset", incorporating more art, music and fashion into its services and offerings with a focus on communal spaces such as the bars and lobbies, digital customer service, and bold color interiors. It has its own branded restaurant, called OUIBAR, and is marketed more at millennials. The brand's emphasis is on modern design, technology, and quick food service.

== See also ==
- Radisson Blu
