= Carlson (company) =

American privately held company

- Type: Private
- Industry: Family office
- Founded: 1938; 88 years ago
- Founder: Curt Carlson
- Headquarters: Minnetonka, Minnesota, United States
- Key people: Andy Cantwell, CEO of Carlson Private Capital Partners
- Owner: Barbara Carlson Gage and Marilyn Carlson Nelson
- Website: carlson.com

Carlson is an American privately held company headquartered in Minnetonka, Minnesota, United States. Its primary subsidiary is Carlson Private Capital Partners, a family office that manages the owners' wealth. It previously held interests in hotels, including Radisson Hotels, and restaurants, including TGI Fridays. The company is owned by Barbara Carlson Gage and Marilyn Carlson Nelson, daughters of the founder, Curt Carlson.

== History ==
=== 1938–1961; foundation as Gold Bond Stamp Company ===
Curt Carlson founded Carlson in 1938. It was originally named the Gold Bond Stamp Company and started with a $55 loan Carlson received from his landlord during the Great Depression. Carlson used "Gold Bond Stamps", a loyalty program based on trading stamps, to provide consumer incentives for grocery stores, supermarkets, and gas stations. The stamps could be redeemed for various items, such as patio furniture or a mink coat. During the 1950s, C. F. Carlson was the nation's largest supplier of mink coats.

=== 1962–2013; Expansion into hospitality industry ===
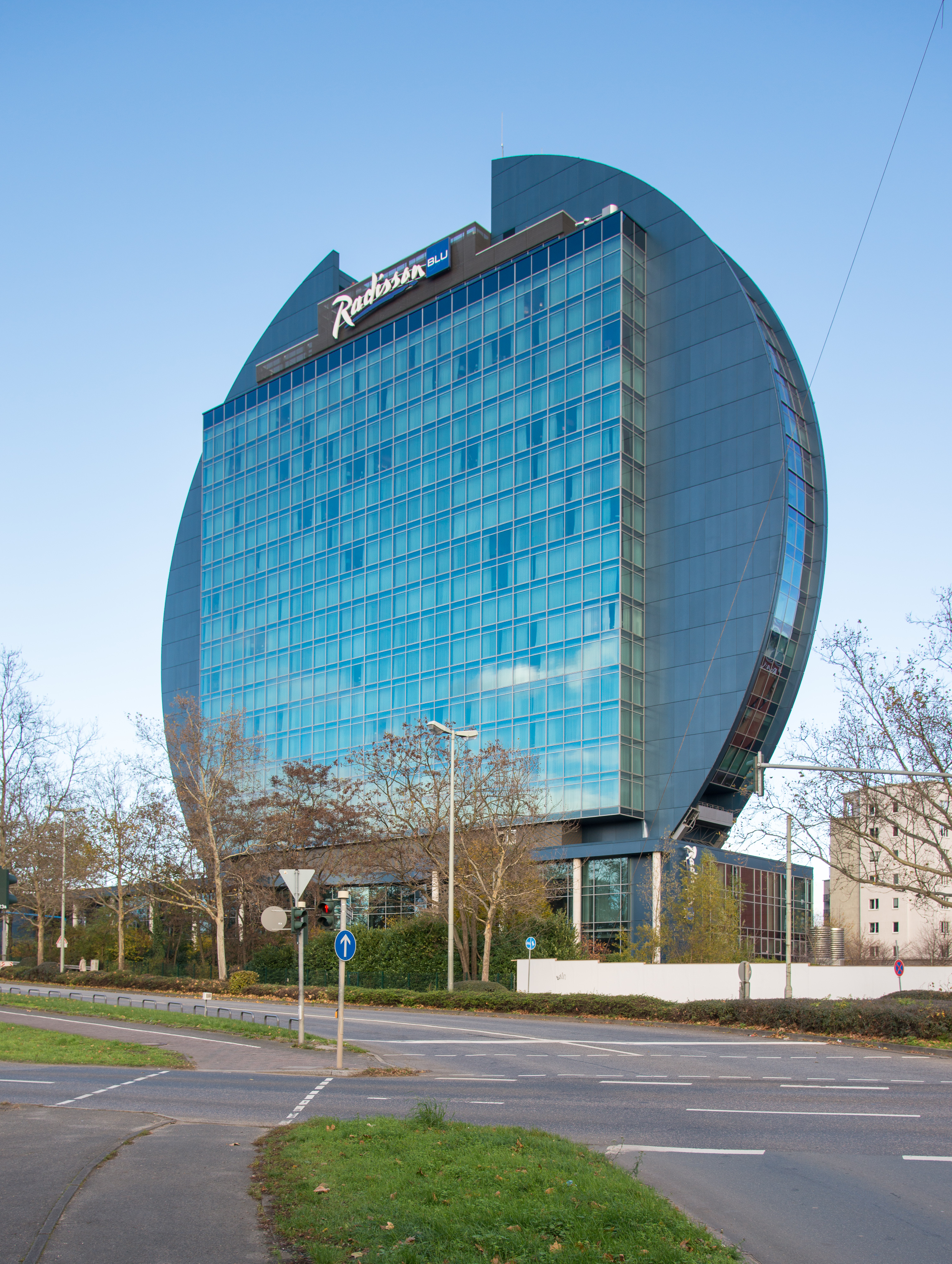
A Radisson Blu hotel in Frankfurt, Germany

In 1962, Carlson bought into his first Radisson Hotel, a vintage property in Minneapolis named after French explorer Pierre-Esprit Radisson. The chain grew rapidly by franchising the name and taking management contracts for new hotels throughout the country. The company was renamed Carlson Companies, Inc., in 1973.

In 1975, Carlson ventured into the restaurant business by acquiring an interest in TGI Fridays, taking full ownership in 1989. It also purchased Country Kitchen, a chain of family-style restaurants in 1977, selling the brand in 1997.

In 1981, Carlson acquired E.F. MacDonald Motivation Co., another incentive management company, making the company the largest trading stamp company in the world. At that time, many employees were working six days per week and not receiving higher pay than those at similar companies with less demands. In 1986, the company also established the Country Inns & Suites brand.

In 1994, Carlson and Compagnie Internationale des Wagons-Lits, a division of Accor, merged their travel agencies to form CWT, a travel management company. In 1997, Carlson acquired Regent Hotels & Resorts from Four Seasons Hotels and Resorts. Carlson gained the rights to develop future hotels, while Four Seasons maintained management of nine hotels. In spring 1998, Curt Carlson named his daughter Marilyn Carlson Nelson as his successor. He died in February 1999 after suffering a stroke. In 2000, the company acquired Park Inn by Radisson and Park Plaza Hotels & Resorts.

In 2005, Carlson acquired 25% of Rezidor Hotel Group, a business partner of the hotel division in the Europe, the Middle East and Africa (EMEA) markets. Rezidor became a subsidiary of the Carlson hotel group in 2010, despite retaining its listing status. The hotel group rebranded as Carlson Rezidor Hotel Group in January 2012.

In 2006, Carlson had operations in 150 companies with global sales of $37.1 billion.

In March 2008, Hubert Joly succeeded Marilyn Carlson Nelson as CEO, marking the first time in the company's history that someone from outside the Carlson family has led the company. Joly resigned in August 2012 to become CEO of Best Buy. Former CFO Trudy Rautio was named as his successor as president and CEO.

=== 2013 to present; divesting and foundation of family office ===
In May 2013, Diana Nelson assumed the chairmanship of the board of directors, succeeding her mother, Marilyn Carlson Nelson, who continues to serve as chairman emeritus. Rautio retired in 2015, leading to the company having separate CEOs for the hotel and travel businesses until the hotel business was sold to HNA.

The company sold TGI Fridays to Sentinel Capital Partners and TriArtisan Capital Partners for a reported $800 million in 2014. Two years later, it sold its hotel division, including Rezidor Hotel Group, Country Inns & Suites by Carlson, Park Inn by Radisson, Park Plaza Hotels & Resorts, Radisson Hotels, Radisson Blu Hotels, and Radisson Red Hotels, to the Chinese conglomerate HNA Group. The division was renamed Radisson Hotel Group in 2018.

In 2018, the company launched a family office to invest its cash. It also renovated its headquarters.

In 2022, CWT received a capital injection from owners which resulted in Carlson moving from majority to minority ownership.

Aug. 11, 2022 Choice Hotels International, Inc. announced that it has completed the acquisition of the franchise business, operations and intellectual property of Radisson Hotels Americas for approximately $675 million from Radisson Hotel Group, inclusive of the real estate value of three owned hotels.
