= Marilyn Carlson Nelson =

American businesswoman

- Born: Marilyn Carlson; August 19, 1939 (age 87)
- Education: Smith College
- Known for: Co-owner, former chairman and CEO of Carlson
- Board member of: Carlson
- Spouse: Glen Nelson (d. 2016)
- Children: 4
- Parent: Curt Carlson

Marilyn Carlson Nelson (born August 19, 1939) is an American businesswoman, the co-owner and former chairman and CEO of Carlson. She shares ownership of the company with her sister, Barbara Carlson Gage.

== Early life ==
Nelson was born on August 19, 1939, the daughter of Curt Carlson, who founded Carlson in 1938. She received a bachelor's degree from Smith College in 1961.

== Career ==
Nelson joined the board of directors of Carlson in 1973. After her father's death in 1999, she took over as CEO. Her daughter, Diana Nelson, succeeded her as chair in 2013.

Nelson has been a member of the board of directors of Qwest Communications (1975–2002), First Bank System (1978–97), and ExxonMobil (1991–2006 or later). She was awarded the Oslo Business for Peace Award in 2014.

== Personal life ==
Nelson resides in Long Lake, Minnesota. She had three children with her husband Glen Nelson, who died in 2016. A daughter, Juliet, died in a car crash in 1985.
