= Radisson Hotel Group =

International hospitality company

Radisson Hospitality Belgium SRL/BV
- Trade name: Radisson Hotel Group
- Formerly: Radisson Hospitality, Inc. Carlson Hotels, Inc.
- Type: Private
- Industry: Hospitality
- Founded: 1962
- Headquarters: Brussels, Belgium
- Number of locations: 120 countries and territories (2021)
- Key people: Federico J. González Tejera (CEO); Sergio Amodeo (CFO); Chema Basterrechea (COO & EVP)
- Brands: Radisson Collection; Radisson Blu; Radisson; Radisson Red; Radisson Individuals; Park Plaza Hotels & Resorts; Park Inn by Radisson; Country Inn & Suites by Radisson; Prize by Radisson; art’otel
- Revenue: ▲$7.3 billion
- Owner: Aplite Holdings AB (a consortium led by Jin Jiang of China)
- Number of employees: Over 100,000 (2021)
- Subsidiaries: Radisson Hospitality AB; Radisson Hospitality Inc.; and others
- Website: radissonhotelgroup.com

Radisson Hospitality Belgium SRL/BV, trading as Radisson Hotel Group is an international hospitality company headquartered in Brussels, Belgium.

The company originated as a division of Carlson Companies, which owned Radisson Hotels, Country Inns & Suites and other brands. In 1994, Carlson signed a franchise agreement with SAS International Hotels (SIH), after which SIH started to use the brand Radisson SAS in the Europe, Middle East and Africa markets. In 2005, Carlson acquired 25% of the shares of SIH, at that time known as Rezidor SAS Hospitality. In 2010, Rezidor Hotel Group (formerly Rezidor SAS) became a subsidiary of Carlson. The enlarged hotel group adopted a new trading name, Carlson Rezidor Hotel Group, which was one of the top hotel corporations in 2013.

In 2016, Carlson Companies sold Carlson Rezidor Hotel Group to Chinese conglomerate HNA Group. In the fourth quarter of 2017, Carlson Hotels, Inc. (the holding company of the hotel group) was renamed Radisson Hospitality, Inc., while the listed subsidiary (Rezidor Hotel Group AB) was renamed Radisson Hospitality AB. In 2018, HNA Group re-sold Radisson to a consortium led by a multi-national hospitality company, Jin Jiang International.

As of 2021, Radisson Hotel Group owns or operates nine hotel brands: Radisson Collection, Radisson Blu, Radisson, Radisson Red, Radisson Individuals, Park Plaza, Park Inn by Radisson, Country Inn & Suites by Radisson and prizeotel. The loyalty program is known as Radisson Rewards.

In June 2022, Radisson Hotel Group agreed to sell Radisson Hotels Americas (consisting of the Radisson franchise agreements, operations and intellectual property in the United States, Canada, Latin America and the Caribbean) to Choice Hotels for $675 million. The deal closed on August 11, 2022.

== History ==
=== Predecessors ===
Curt Carlson, founder of the namesake company, bought Radisson Hotel in downtown Minneapolis in 1962 (Radisson Hotel Group claimed it was 1960). 40 years later, the hotel division of Carlson had expanded into one of the top hotel corporations, as of 2013. On top of Radisson Hotels, the division also owned several other brands, such as Park Inn, Park Plaza (acquired in 2000), Country Inns & Suites (founded by Carlson in 1986), etc. The division acquired the brand Regent in 1997, but sold the brand in 2010.

In 1994, the division expanded into Europe, the Middle East and Africa markets (EMEA) by signing a franchise agreement with SAS Group's SAS International Hotels (SIH). SIH would use Carlson's brand Radisson in EMEA. The agreement gave birth of the co-brand Radisson SAS, which became Radisson Blu since 2009. SAS International Hotels, later known as Rezidor SAS Hospitality in 2001 and then Rezidor Hotel Group in 2006, had expanded into a hotel group that consisted of more than 320 hotels as of 2008.

The franchise agreement was renewed in 2002 and again in 2005. The 2002 deal added Park Inn, Regent and Country Inns into the agreement, while in 2005 agreement, Carlson purchased 25% shares of Rezidor SAS from SAS Group. The 2005 franchise agreement would last until year 2052.

Rezidor Hotel Group also had other brands, such as Hotel Missoni, which was licensed from Missoni.

=== Carlson Rezidor Hotel Group ===
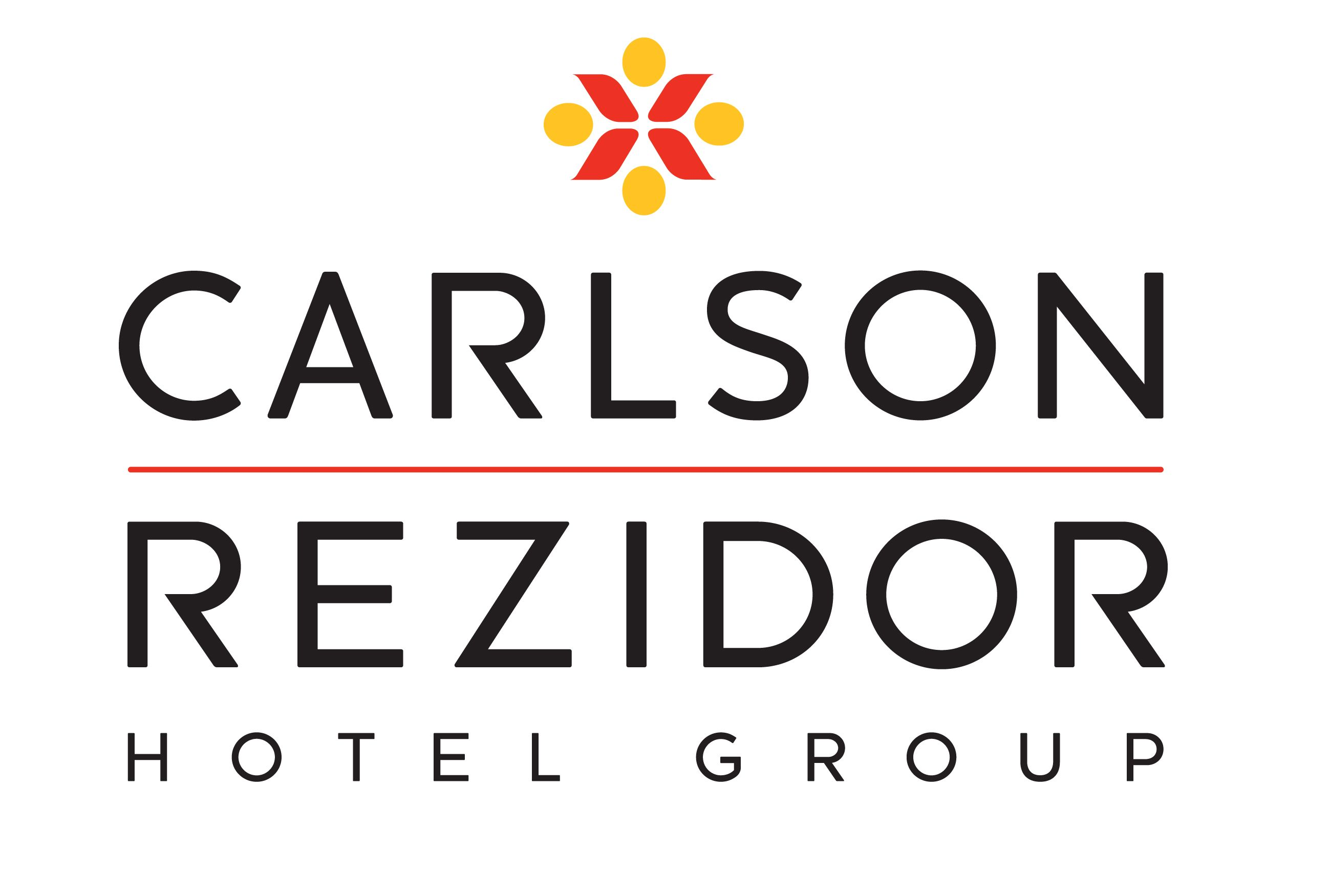
Logo of Carlson Rezidor Hotel Group

Rezidor Hotel Group, formerly Rezidor SAS, became a listed company in 2006. SAS Group ceased to be the shareholder of Rezidor Hotel Group in 2007, while Carlson, a significant shareholder of Rezidor SAS since 2005, became the parent company of Rezidor Hotel Group in 2010.

Since January 2012, the enlarged hotel group was trading as Carlson Rezidor Hotel Group. In February 2014, Carlson Rezidor terminated the license agreement of Hotel Missoni. Carlson Rezidor's Hotel Missoni Edinburgh and Hotel Missoni Kuwait would cease to use the brand Hotel Missoni not later than June 30, 2014. In the same month, two new brands of the group were introduced, namely Quorvus Collection and Radisson Red.

In March 2016, Carlson Rezidor acquired a 49% stake in German hotel chain prizeotel, for €14.7 million, with a future right to acquire the remaining 51% of the shares. (On October 4, 2019, Radisson announced that it was purchasing the remaining 51% of prizeotel.) In April 2016, Carlson Rezidor Hotel Group was sold to HNA Tourism Group, a division of Chinese conglomerate HNA Group. The loyalty programs: HNA Group and Hainan Airlines' Fortune Wings Club and Radisson's Radisson Rewards, signed a partnership agreement in June 2018.

=== Radisson Hotel Group ===
In the fourth quarter of 2017, Carlson Hotels, Inc. (the US-based holding company of Carlson Rezidor Hotel Group) was renamed Radisson Hospitality, Inc., while the Brussels-based Swedish-listed subsidiary (Rezidor Hotel Group AB) was renamed Radisson Hospitality AB in May 2018. The whole group received a new trading name – Radisson Hotel Group. The Club Carlson customer loyalty program was renamed Radisson Rewards.

In August 2018, Radisson Hotel Group was sold to Aplite Holdings AB, a consortium led by a Chinese state-owned hospitality company, Jin Jiang International. According to the press release, Radisson Hotel Group had more than 1,400 hotels in operation and under development at that time. As of December 2017, the listed subsidiary Rezidor Hotel Group AB had been operating 369 hotels.

In June 2022, the Radisson Hotel Group agreed to sell Radisson Hotels Americas, consisting of the Radisson franchise agreements, operations and intellectual property in the United States, Canada, Latin America and the Caribbean to Choice Hotels for $675 million. The deal closed on August 11, 2022.

== Brands ==
As of 2024, the Radisson Hotel Group operates properties under the following brands:

- Radisson Collection
- Radisson Blu
- Radisson
- Radisson RED
- Radisson Individuals
- Radisson Inn & Suites (Note: Ownership split between Radisson Hotel Group and Choice Hotels)
- Park Plaza Hotels & Resorts
- Park Inn by Radisson
- Country Inn & Suites by Radisson
- Prize by Radisson (formerly branded as prizeotel)
- art’otel

Radisson also operated hotels under the brand Regent Hotels & Resorts, which was sold in 2010, and as Hotel Missoni under a master license agreement that was mutually terminated in 2014. with the two Hotel Missoni properites rebranding under Quorvus Collection.

=== Radisson Collection ===
Radisson Collection

Radisson Collection was formerly known as Quorvus Collection from 2014 to 2018. Quorvus Collection was introduced in 2014 as a luxury brand. The first hotel of the former Rezidor Hotel Group in Copenhagen was converted to use the Radisson Collection brand.

=== Country Inn & Suites by Radisson ===
Country Inn & Suites

Country Inn & Suites by Radisson, formerly Country Inns & Suites by Carlson and Country Inns by Carlson, is a hotel chain of the Radisson Hotel Group (former Carlson Hotels). It was established by the former Carlson Hotels' owner, Carlson Companies in 1986 as a "middle-class" brand. The sister brand, Radisson Hotels was classified as full-service, upscale brand of the group. Carlson Companies also owned the namesake, Country Kitchen restaurant chain at that time.

In January 2018, two years after Carlson sold Carlson–Rezidor hotel group to HNA Group, the chain was rebranded into "Country Inn & Suites by Radisson".

== See also ==
- PPHE Hotel Group – licensee of Park Plaza brand in Europe and the Middle East regions; PPHE Hotel Group also owns art'otel and other brands, and participated in Radisson Hotel Group's loyalty program, Radisson Rewards.
