= Country Inn & Suites =

Upper midscale hotel franchise

- Industry: Hospitality
- Founded: 1986
- Number of locations: 431 (as of 2024)
- Area served: Americas
- Owner: Choice Hotels (Americas); Radisson Hotel Group (Outside the Americas)
- Website: https://www.choicehotels.com/country-inn-suites

Country Inn & Suites is an upper midscale hotel chain founded in 1986 by Carlson Holdings. Competing brands in the upper midscale segment include Hampton by Hilton, Holiday Inn Express, Best Western Plus, and Fairfield by Marriott.

== History ==
Carlson Holdings launched Country Inns by Carlson in 1986 to serve the midscale hospitality segment. As part of a co-branding strategy, the original Country Inns hosted Country Kitchen restaurants, an arrangement which ended when Carlson sold the latter brand to Kitchen Investment Group in 1997. In 1994, Carlson entered a master franchise agreement with Rezidor Hotel Group AB, granting Rezidor rights to operate Radisson properties in Europe, the Middle East, and Africa (EMEA).

By the late 2000s, the Country Inn & Suites portfolio had grown to over 500 locations, mainly in the United States. In response to the 2008 global financial crisis, the brand reduced amenity spending by 7% as part of broader cost-containment efforts. In 2010, Rezidor placed the Country Inn & Suites brand under review. At the time, only two locations were operated under Rezidor management in the EMEA region.

=== Ownership changes ===
In 2016, Carlson publicly confirmed it had retained Morgan Stanley to explore strategic alternatives for its hotel division, including a potential sale or merger. Later that year, China's HNA Tourism Group acquired Carlson Rezidor Hotel Group, bringing Country Inn & Suites under its ownership as part of the deal.

In 2018, the brand was renamed Country Inn & Suites by Radisson. Around the same time, the brand launched a new logo, marketing campaign, and updated visual identity. Later that year, Jinjiang International acquired the Country Inn brand from HNA as part of its acquisition of Radisson Hotel Group (previously Carlson Rezidor).

In 2022, Choice Hotels International acquired Radisson Hotel Group Americas for $675 million. Of the 624 hotels included in the deal, 453 were Country Inn & Suites properties, making it the single largest brand component of the acquisition.

== Corporate affairs ==
In 2013, Country Inn & Suites launched a brand refresh aimed at attracting millennial business guests, including design changes and expanded communal spaces. The first property to showcase the new design, a 78-room hotel in Springfield, Illinois, featured architectural updates, a pool, and an outdoor veranda. In 2025, Choice Hotels introduced a new prototype hotel including a redesigned lobby, updated breakfast offerings, and a new layout with 18 more guest rooms.

== See also ==
- List of hotels
