= Thurnham =

Thurnam may refer to:

== People ==
- Peter Thurnham (1938–2008), British politician
- Stephen Thurnham (died 1214), British justice and administrator

== Places ==
- Thurnham, Kent, a village and parish in Kent, England
  - Thurnham Castle
- Thurnham, Lancashire
