= George Albert Turnham =

American politician (1859–1948)

George Albert Turnham (February 9, 1859 – December 3, 1948) was a businessman, road and bridge contractor, and politician.

Turnham was born near Long Lake, Hennepin County, Minnesota. He lived in Long Lake, Minnesota with his wife and family and was a road and bridge contractor. Turnham served on the Orono, Minnesota Township Board and was the chair. Turnham served in the Minnesota Senate from 1915 to 1930.
