= Christmas Lake =

Lake in the state of Minnesota, United States

- Location within Minnesota
- Location: Shorewood / Chanhassen, Minnesota, United States
- Coordinates: 44°53′53″N 93°32′29″W
- Primary inflows: springs
- Basin countries: United States
- Surface area: 265 acres (1.1 km^{2})
- Max. depth: 87 ft (27 m)

Christmas Lake is a spring-fed lake covering approximately 265 acres (1.1 km^{2}) in the western Minneapolis suburbs of Shorewood and Chanhassen. The lake is crossed by the border of Hennepin and Carver counties, with most of the area lying within the jurisdiction of the former. Christmas Lake is known for its exceptional water clarity, the best in the Minneapolis metropolitan area, with a DNR-reported clarity level of 20 feet (6.10 m). This clarity can be attributed to the fact that Christmas Lake is a spring fed lake with a sandy bottom. Although relatively small in area, Christmas Lake becomes deep (its maximum depth is 87 ft (27 m)) very quickly, forming the basin of a depression that extends all along "the Ridge" (the rim of the lake's basin). The steep nature of the shoreline means that many houses are built far above the lake with railed motorized carts to provide access to the docks at the water level.

Although Christmas Lake is located very near to the much larger and more populated Lake Minnetonka, the lake culture is much different, with fewer powerboats and jetskis, although this is slowly changing. Christmas Lake is connected to Lake Minnetonka by an underground canal which can be used to raise the water level of Lake Minnetonka during droughts.

Christmas Lake falls under the jurisdiction of the city of Shorewood, Minnesota, although much informal control is maintained by the close-knit community of homeowners, under the aegis of the Christmas Lake Homeowners Association. Neighbors organize an annual Fourth of July boat parade, where boat owners turn their boats into water-borne floats, and parade from dock to dock along the shoreline.

== Wildlife ==
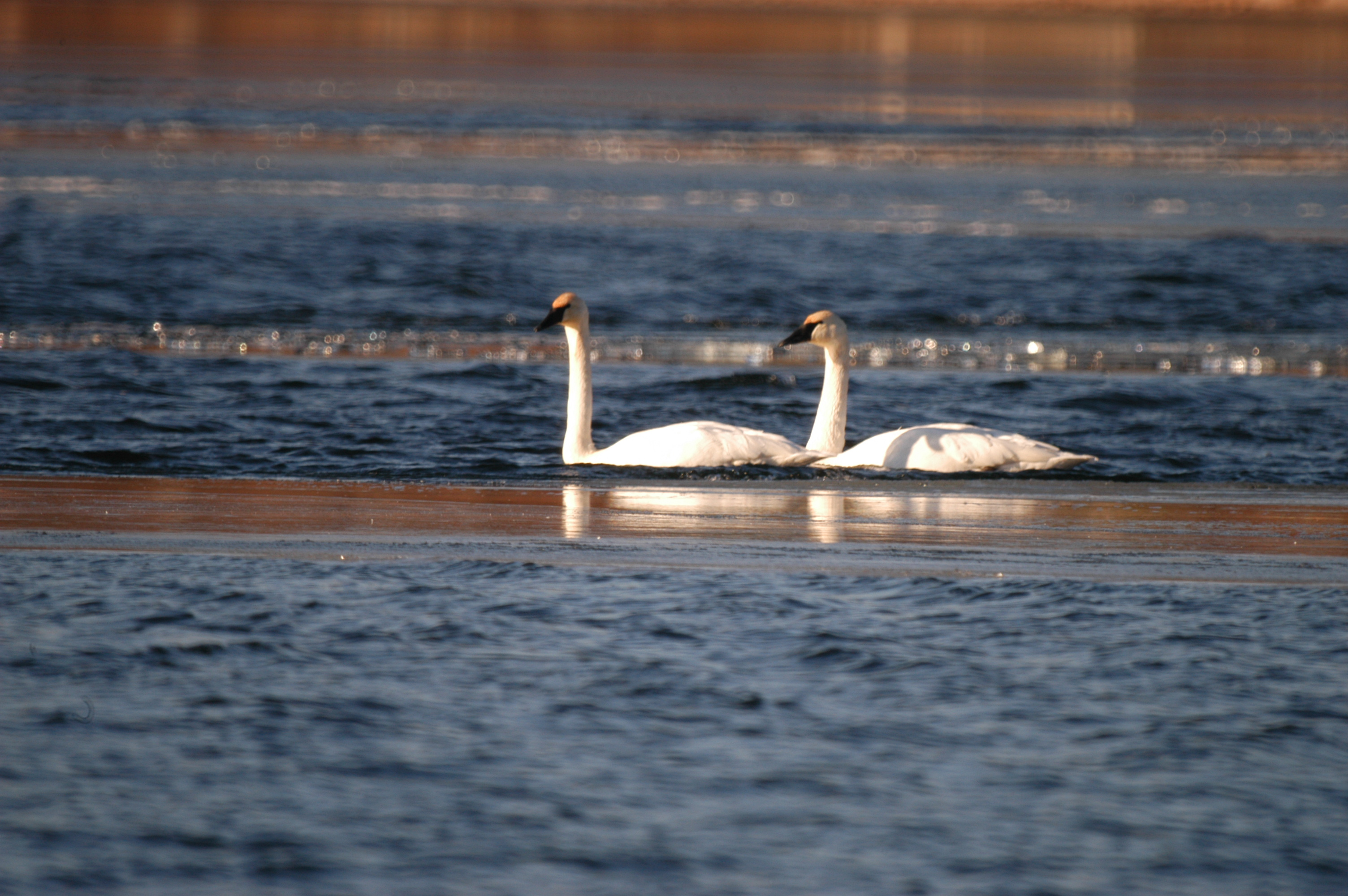
Trumpeter Swans on Christmas Lake before ice-in in 2006.

Christmas Lake is home to a number of native and introduced species of fish, the most prevalent of which are largemouth bass, bluegill and pumpkinseed sunfish, crappie, northern pike, carp, and rainbow trout. However, due to the small size of the lake, the fish (with the exception of carp) do not generally grow to large sizes. Some fish consumption guideline restrictions have been placed on the lake's bluegill, carp, northern pike, and white sucker due to mercury contamination.

For the first time in recent memory, trumpeter swans have since 2004 been using Christmas Lake as a stop-over on their flyway during their winter migration south. At first a small number of swans stayed for a few days, and by 2011 that number had grown to over four dozen in three different groups who stayed on the lake for more than a month. As Christmas Lake is deeper than surrounding lakes, and usually the last in the neighborhood to freeze over, the swans are able to swim and feed later in the season.

In the fall of 2014, zebra mussels were observed in the lake and the Minnehaha Creek Watershed District subjected approximately one acre of it to an experimental series of chemical treatments, first the Zequanox killed-bacteria biological pesticide (in its first use in a lake), followed by copper, and then by potash (in its third such use in the U.S.). Divers later confirmed that none had survived within the treated area, but discovered ten more of them nearby, attached to indigenous mussels, and in May the treatment was applied to that additional area.

== The name ==
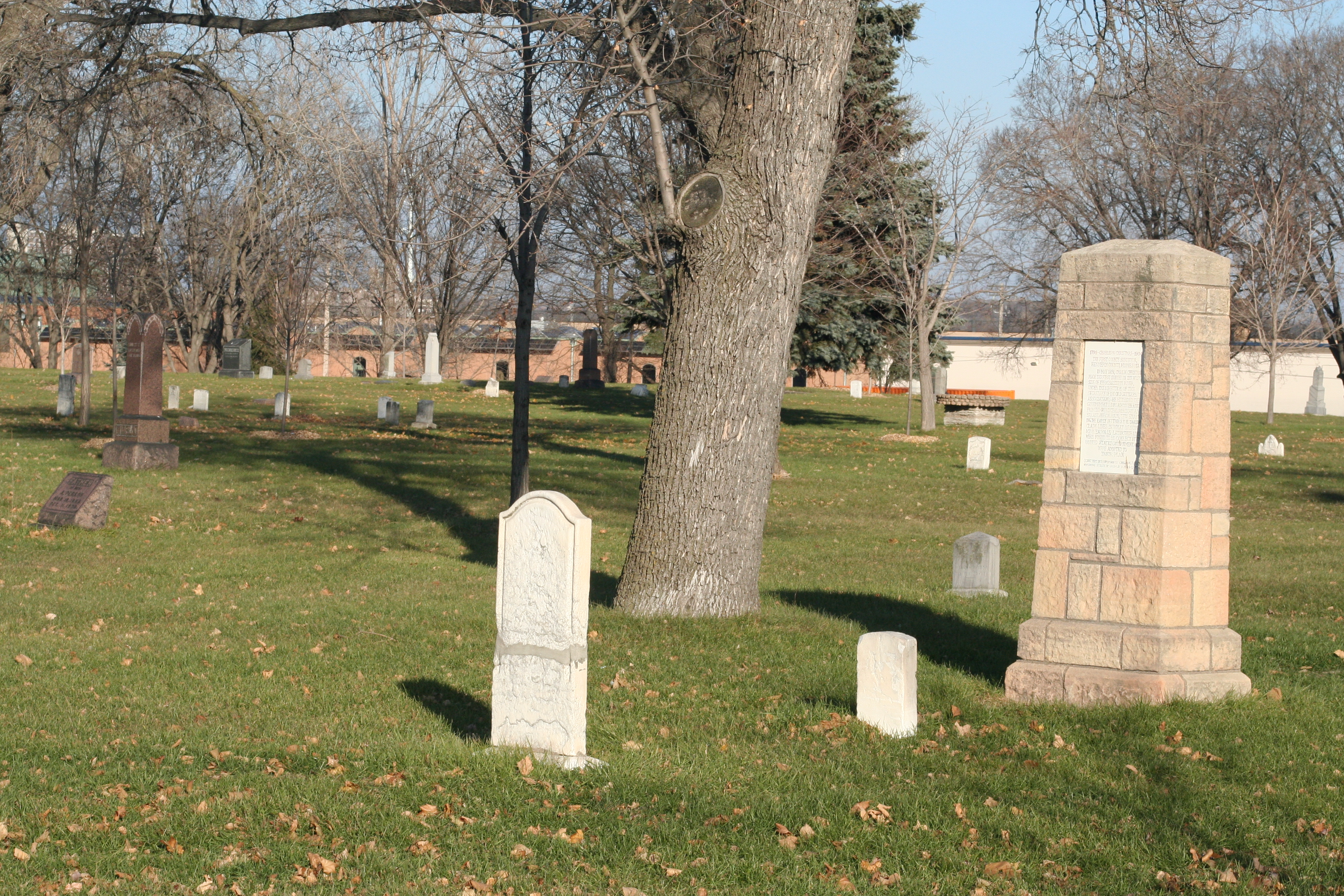
Pillar on right is monument for Charles W. Christmas (1798–1904) in Minneapolis Pioneers and Soldiers Memorial Cemetery.

The lake is named for Charles W. Christmas, first county surveyor of Hennepin County, who platted the original town site of Minneapolis for John H. Stevens and Franklin Steele.
