= Curt Carlson =

American businessman

Curtis Leroy Carlson (July 9, 1914 – February 19, 1999) was an American businessman and founder of Carlson and Radisson Hotel Group. Carlson developed a popular trading stamp consumer loyalty program for grocery stores in the United States.

== Early life and education ==
Carlson was born in Minneapolis, Minnesota, the son of Charles and Leatha Carlson. Charles Carlson was a Swedish-American immigrant who arrived as a child in Minnesota; Leatha Carlson was born in Downing, Wisconsin of a Danish father and Swedish mother. Curt Carlson began a career with Procter and Gamble after earning a BA in Economics in 1937 from the University of Minnesota where he was a member of Sigma Phi Epsilon fraternity.

== Career ==
Carlson began working for Procter & Gamble and then founded the Gold Bond Stamp Company in 1938. Carlson used "Gold Bond Stamps", a consumer loyalty program based on trading stamps, to provide consumer incentive for grocery stores. Carlson was the first entrepreneur to develop a loyalty program for a grocery chain through the issuance of trading stamps.

Carlson expanded his offerings by purchasing the downtown Minneapolis Radisson Hotel in 1960 and building it into a national chain. He also acquired TGI Fridays, Carlson Leisure Group and hundreds of other hospitality businesses. Carlson collaborated with talent agent Al Sheehan to establish the Golden Strings, a night club act at the Radisson Hotel Flame Room in Minneapolis. The ensemble performed to more than two million people from 1963 to 1981, credited as the world's longest running violin show according to Variety magazine.

The Carlson School of Management at the University of Minnesota is named for him, in recognition of his $25 million gift, the largest single donation to a public university at that time. Curt Carlson created an estate in Lake Nebagamon, Wisconsin which was later converted to a business resort for corporations.

== Awards ==
- Royal Swedish Academy of Sciences Linnean Medal presented by H.M. Carl XVI Gustaf, King of Sweden
- Golden Plate Award of the American Academy of Achievement, 1977
- Horatio Alger Award; the Swedish-American of the Year Award, Stockholm, Sweden in 1981
- Town and Country magazine Philanthropist of the Year Award, 1987–1988
- International Citizen of the Year Award from the City of Minneapolis
- 1989 Scandinavian-American Hall of Fame inductee
- 1995 DeMolay International Hall of Fame
