= Federico J. González Tejera =

Spanish businessman and business writer (born 1964)

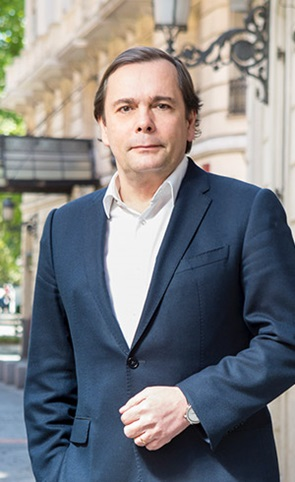
- Federico J. González Tejera at the WTTC Global Summit 2015
- Born: 12 April 1964 (age 62)
- Education: Universidad Complutense de Madrid
- Occupation: Businessman
- Title: President and CEO, Radisson Hospitality AB (publ), Chairman, Global Steering Committee, Radisson Hotel Group

Federico J. González Tejera (born 12 April 1964) is a Spanish businessman and business writer. He is known as the president & CEO of Radisson Hospitality AB and the Chairman of Radisson Hotel Group's Global Steering Committee. He was born in 1964 in Spain, where he attended Universidad Complutense de Madrid.

== Education ==
González attended Complutense University of Madrid, where he majored in Economics and received a Masters in International Trade and Finance from the École Supérieure de Commerce de Paris (ESCP).

== Career ==
González previously worked in the hospitality, leisure and fast-moving consumer goods (FMCG) sectors, and held posts as chief executive officer of NH Hotel Group, Deputy general manager of Disneyland Paris various management positions (including Country Head of Portugal) at Procter & Gamble.

In January 2017, he was then named as the CEO of Radisson Hospitality Inc. (formerly named Carlson Hotels), the Radisson Hotel Group entity headquartered in Minneapolis, US, and operating in the Americas and Asia Pacific (APAC). From here, he moved to the position of President & CEO of Radisson Hospitality AB (publ) – formerly named The Rezidor Hotel Group – headquartered in Brussels, Belgium, and operating across 80 countries in Europe, the Middle East & Africa (EMEA). He currently holds this role.

As well as being the President & CEO of Radisson Hospitality AB (publ), González Tejera is also the chairman of the Global Steering Committee of Radisson Hotel Group. This is composed equally of representatives from Radisson Hospitality AB (publ) and from Radisson Hospitality Inc.

In January 2018, he announced the launch of a five-year operating plan to transform the company and lead it to become one of the top hotel companies in the world.

Since 30 April 2019, he has served as a board member for Radisson Hospitality AB (publ).

As President & CEO of Radisson Hospitality AB (publ) and Chairman of the Group Steering Committee, in March 2018, he led and unveiled the launch of the new identity of Radisson Hotel Group, replacing Carlson Rezidor Hotel Group – alongside a reorganization of the group's portfolio and the launch of the Radisson Collection brand.

As a leader of the group, he has committed to achieving the ITP Industry Goals and to supporting the UN Sustainable Development goals – as well as launching a worldwide partnership with SOS Children's Villages.

== Business writing ==
González is fluent in multiple languages including English, Spanish, Portuguese and French, and he has written three books: Vivir y trabajar en el extranjero: Manual de supervivencia; Portugueses y españoles: Una guía para entenderse mejor and Cómo "hacerse el sueco" en los negocios con éxito.

== Selected list of works ==
- Vivir y trabajar en el extranjero: Manual de supervivencia (Living and Working Abroad), ISBN 978-8488123589
- Portugueses y españoles: Una guía para entenderse mejor, ISBN 978-8488123992
- Cómo "hacerse el sueco" en los negocios con éxito, ISBN 978-8488123343
