= Park Plaza Hotels & Resorts =

Brand of hotel chain

- Product type: hotel chain
- Current owner: Radisson Hotel Group; Choice Hotels
- Produced by: Radisson Hotel Group; PPHE Hotel Group (franchisee)
- Country: United States
- Introduced: 1986
- Related brands: Park Inn; Radisson; Country Inn & Suites; prizeotel; art'otel (owned by PPHE)
- Markets: Worldwide
- Previous owners: Park Plaza International; Olympus Hospitality Group; Park Hospitality
- Website: www.choicehotels.com/park-plaza www.parkplaza.com

Park Plaza Hotels & Resorts, formerly Park Plaza International Hotels, Inns and Resorts and commonly known as just Park Plaza, is a hotel chain which runs several hotel groups as franchises. It was established in 1986 as a company and acquired by Olympus Real Estate in 1997. In year 2000, Carlson acquired Park Plaza Hotels & Resorts as well as sister brand Park Inn. Today, the brands are owned by Radisson Hotel Group (formerly Carlson Hotels) in the EMEA and Asia Pacific regions, and by Choice Hotels International in the Americas.

== History ==
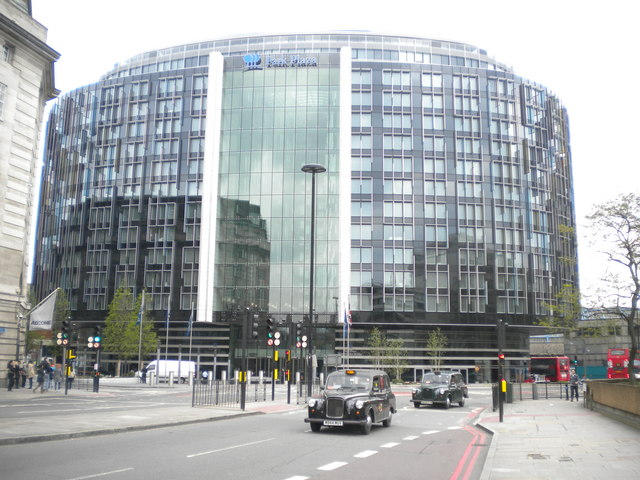
Park Plaza in Westminster

=== Foundation and early years ===
Park Plaza International was founded as a hotel management company and brand in 1986 by Jonathan R. Read. In 1994, Park Plaza International licensed the Park Plaza brand to "Park Plaza Hotels Limited" with rights to operate in Belgium, The Netherlands, Luxembourg, the United Kingdom and Israel.

Park Plaza International was acquired by Olympus Hospitality Group, a division of Olympus Real Estate, in October 1997. According to The Wall Street Journal, a new parent company of the Park Plaza hotel group, Park Hotels International LLC, was formed as part of the deal. At the time, Park Plaza International owned both the Park Plaza and Park Inn hotel chains.

In June 1998, Park Plaza International, backed by Olympus Real Estate, acquired a controlling stake in Australia-listed company Kemayan Hotels and Leisure (KHL). KHL was renamed Park Plaza Kemayan.

In July 1999, Park Plaza Worldwide, LLC [sic], acquired 50% rights of the brand art'otel from Dirk Gadeke. In mid-1999, it was reported that Park Plaza Worldwide formed another joint venture with J.E. Robert Companies (JER), with JER owned 80% stake of the JV. In addition, JER had an option to acquire up to 35% of Park Plaza Worldwide. In July 1999, Paris Park Plaza Worldwide also announced the opening of Park Plaza Orleans Palace. That hotel was acquired by the joint venture with JER, according to reports.

=== Takeover by Carlson from 2000 ===
Olympus Hospitality Group and Carlson Hotels Worldwide partnered in 2000 to form “Park Hospitality” to grow the Park Inn, Park Plaza, Radisson Hotels & Resorts, and Regent International Hotels brands. Two years later, Rezidor SAS Hospitality made a master franchise agreement with Carlson which included rights to the Park Inn brand in Europe, Middle East, and Africa.

In the same year, Park Plaza Worldwide, chaired by Read, gave "Park Plaza Hotels Limited" (subsequently renamed "Park Plaza Hotels Europe" and then PPHE Hotel Group) exclusive territorial rights for the Park Plaza brand in the EMEA region. Park Plaza International LLC, [sic] also acquired another hotel brand Rockresorts in August 2000: however, it was sold in the next year.

Carlson acquired the remaining stake of Park Plaza and Park Inn brands from Olympus Hospitality Group in 2003. The rights to use the brands in the Asia Pacific was also bought back from Park Plaza Kemayan in the same year. Carlson's hospitality business was renamed Radisson Hotel Group in 2017. A new logo of Park Plaza was announced in 2019.

In 2022, Choice Hotels International purchased Radisson Hotels Americas for $675 million, acquiring the Park Plaza and Park Inn franchise agreements in the United States, Canada, Latin America and the Caribbean.

== Park Inn by Radisson ==
Park Inn by Radisson
- Product type: Hotel chain
- Current owner: Radisson Hotel Group; Choice Hotels
- Produced by: Radisson Hotel Group; Rezidor Hotel Group (franchisee)
- Country: United States
- Introduced: 1986 in Arizona
- Related brands: Park Plaza Hotels & Resorts
- Markets: Europe, Asia, Middle East
- Previous owners: Park Plaza International; Olympus Hospitality Group; Park Hospitality
- Website: www.choicehotels.com/park-inn www.parkinn.com

Park Inn by Radisson, formerly branded Park Inn and Park Inn International, is a midscale hotel chain and a sister brand to Park Plaza. It is owned by Radisson Hotel Group in the EMEA and Asia Pacific regions and by Choice Hotels in the Americas.

=== History ===
The company was founded in 1986 in Arizona and was subsequently acquired by Carlson Companies along with sister company Park Plaza in 2003.

In 2002, Rezidor Hotel Group acquired exclusive franchising rights to Carlson Company brands, including Park Inn, in Europe, the Middle East and Africa. Rezidor focused on expanding the Park Inn brand in the Middle East. In 2010, Carlson became the majority shareholder in Rezidor, and the two combined global operations as the Carlson Rezidor Hotel Group.

=== Locations ===
As of 2025, Radisson Hotel Group franchises over 130 Park Inn locations, including 76 in the EMEA region and 56 in Asia Pacific. There were also 40 locations in the Americas as of the end of 2024, franchised by Choice Hotels.

Among its most notable properties is the Park Inn by Radisson at Alexanderplatz, one of the tallest and most notable buildings in Berlin.
