= Radisson Blu =

Hotel chain

- Company type: Subsidiary
- Industry: Hospitality
- Founded: 1960; 66 years ago
- Headquarters: Minneapolis, United States (Note: Americas region); Brussels, Belgium (Note: Rest of the world)
- Number of locations: 324 (2022)
- Area served: Worldwide
- Key people: Wolfgang M. Neumann (President & CEO)
- Owner: Choice Hotels (Note: Americas region (United States, Canada, Caribbean, and Latin America) since 2019.); Jinjiang International (Note: China, and co-branded Radisson Blu in Frankfurt, Germany, with Radisson Hotel Group, since 2018.); Radisson Hotel Group (Note: Rest of the world.)
- Website: www.radissonhotels.com/en-us/brand/radisson-blu

Radisson Blu is an international hotel brand owned by Choice Hotels in the Americas and by Radisson Hotel Group in the rest of the world. Founded as the SAS Hotels in 1960, the Radisson Blu brand name came into existence in 2006 with a rebranding of Radisson SAS. It operates in Europe, the Middle East, Africa, and the Asia-Pacific region with 324 operating worldwide as of 2022.

== History ==
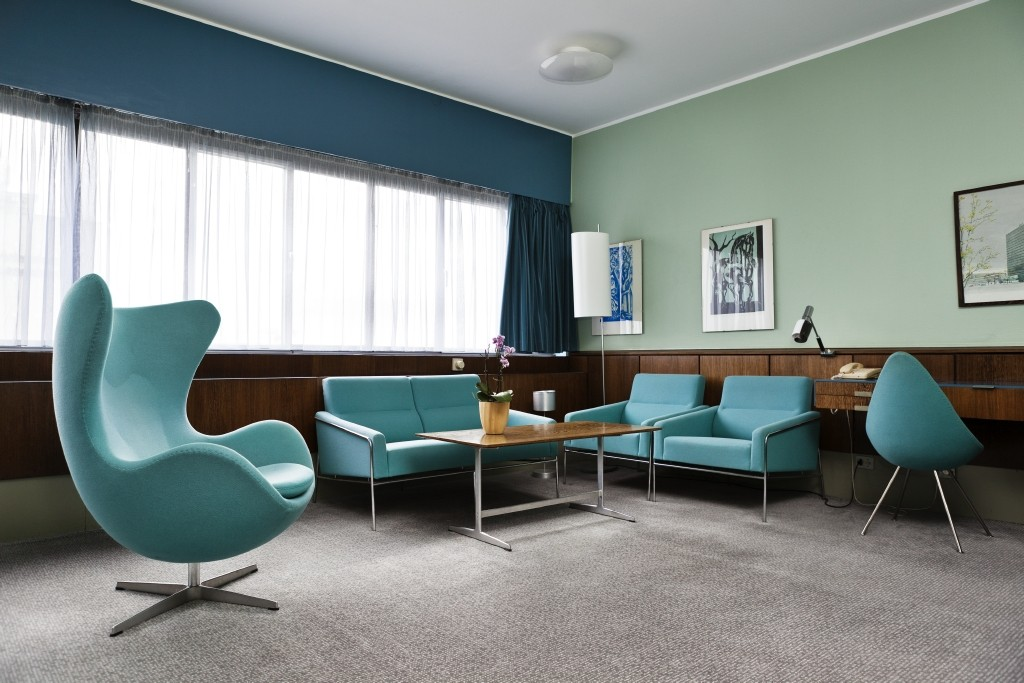
Room 606 at the Radisson Collection Royal Hotel, Copenhagen in Copenhagen, designed by Arne Jacobsen.

=== Foundation as SAS Hotels ===
SAS Hotels has roots dating to the opening of the then named SAS Royal Hotel in Copenhagen, Denmark in 1960. Architect Arne Jacobsen designed every aspect of the hotel for the SAS Group, from the building, to the now-iconic furniture (including the Egg chair), to the tableware. The hotel was initially operated by the catering division of the group, but merged with the hospitality division to become SAS Catering and Hotels. In 1982, the hotels were spun off as a separate division, operating under the name SAS International Hotels.

In 1994, Radisson SAS Hotels was created, as a partnership between Radisson Hotels International and SAS International Hotels, for operations in Europe, the Middle East and Africa. By the year 2000, the brand was operating 100 hotels.

=== Rebranding to Radisson Blu since 2009 ===
Radisson Blu hotel in Vilnius

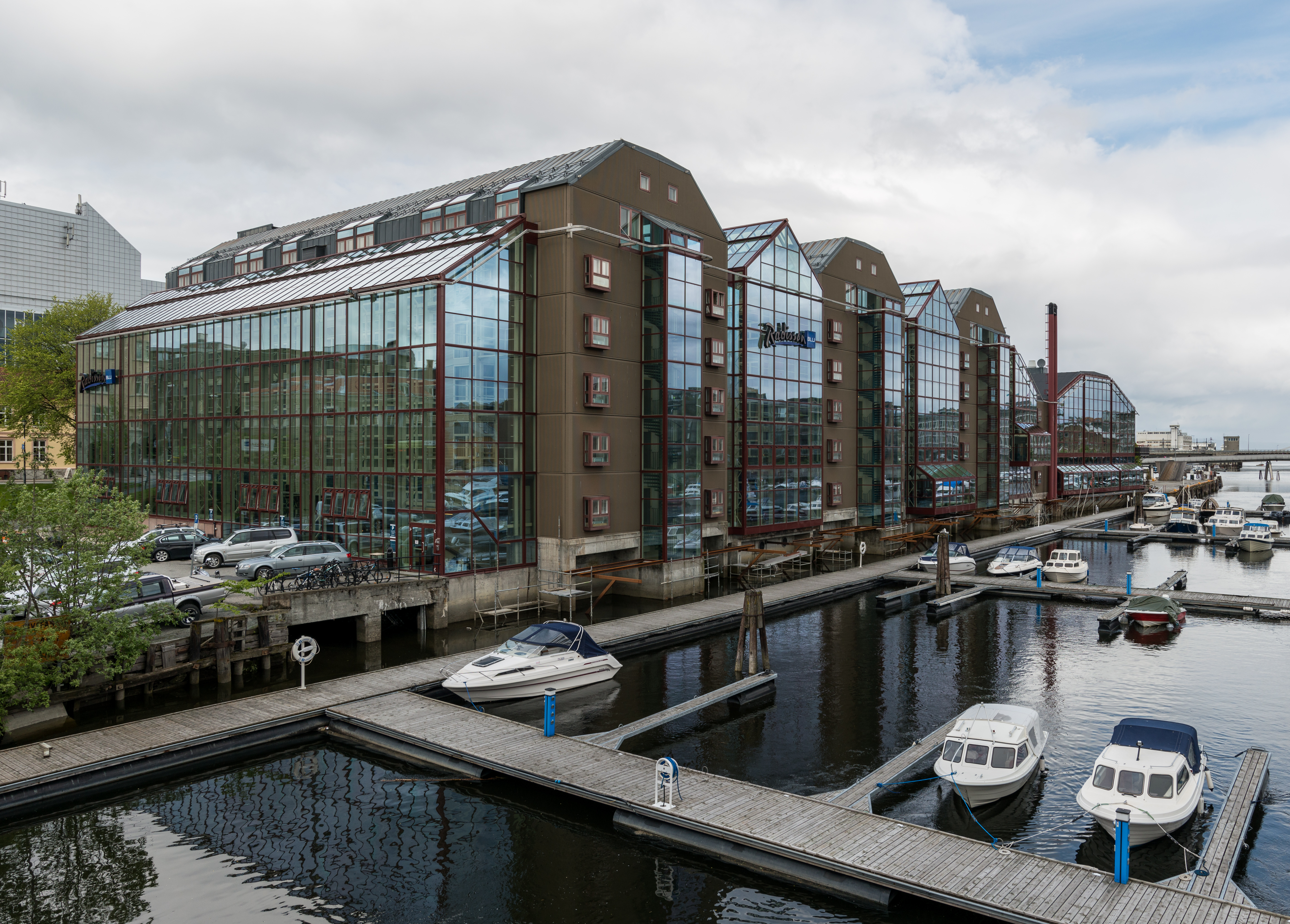
Radisson Blu in Trondheim

In 2009, the partnership with SAS ended and the Radisson SAS properties were rebranded as Radisson Blu. The name ‘Blu’ was chosen as part of a research project to find a new visual identity as the company sought to replace the familiar SAS blue box.

Radisson Blu entered the United States market with the opening of its first hotel in Chicago, Illinois in 2011. The hotel occupies part of the Aqua skyscraper developed by Studio Gang Architects. In 2013, it opened its second location. It was connected to the Mall of America in Bloomington, Minnesota. In 2010, Radisson Blu was named the largest upper upscale hotel chain in Europe.

== Concept ==
Radisson Blu hotels are mainly located in major cities, key airport gateways and leisure destinations. It is described as an "upper upscale" hotel brand.

== See also ==
- AquaDom
