= Jinjiang International =

Chinese state-owned enterprise

Jin Jiang International (Holdings) Co., Ltd. 锦江国际（集团）有限公司
- Type: Limited Liability Companies (LLCs)
- Industry: Tourism; Hospitality
- Founded: 2003
- Founder: Shanghai Municipal People's Government
- Headquarters: Shanghai, China
- Area served: Worldwide
- Key people: Tue Nguyen (CEO)
- Services: Hotels, resorts, travel, transport, logistics
- Revenue: $8.68 billion (2017)
- Total assets: $6.16 billion (2017)
- Owner: Shanghai Municipal State-owned Assets Supervision and Administration Commission (上海市国有资产监督管理委员会)
- Number of employees: 100,000 (2017)
- Subsidiaries: Jinjiang Hotels; Louvre Hotels Group; Groupe du Louvre

Chinese name
- Simplified Chinese: 锦江国际（集团）有限公司
- Traditional Chinese: 錦江國際（集團）有限公司
Transcriptions
Standard Mandarin
- Hanyu Pinyin: Jǐnjiāng Guójì (Jítuán) Yǒuxiàn Gōngsī
- Website: www.jinjiang.com

Jin Jiang International (Holdings) Co., Ltd. is a tourism and hospitality company headquartered in Shanghai, China, and owned by the Shanghai Municipal People's Government.

== Corporate affairs ==
Its headquarters are in the Union Friendship Tower in Huangpu.

The group operates Shanghai's Jinjiang Hotel, Peace Hotel, Park Hotel, and Metropole Hotel. Other chains operated by the group include the Jinjiang Inn (Note: simplified Chinese: 锦江之星连锁酒店; traditional Chinese: 錦江之星連鎖酒店; pinyin: Jǐnjiāng Zhīxīng Liánsuǒ Jiǔdiàn) and Bestay Hotel Express, (Note: 百时快捷酒店; 百時快捷酒店; Bǎishí Kuàijié Jiǔdiàn) and Magnotel. (Note: 白玉兰酒店; 白玉蘭酒店; Bái Yùlán Jiǔdiàn) Interstate Hotels and Resorts manages 382 hotels and resorts in 10 countries in North America, Europe and Asia, in which Jinjiang International holds a 50 percent stake.

In January 2015, Jin Jiang International Hotels Development Co. acquired Europe's Groupe du Louvre for 1.21 billion euros from U.S. investment firm Starwood Capital Group. In September 2015, Jin Jiang International Hotels Development Co. acquired 81% of Keystone Lodging Holding, which owns Plateno Hotels Group, 7 Days Inn and ZMAX, creating one of the world's largest hotel groups. Jinjiang International led a consortium to buy Radisson Hotel Group (former Carlson Rezidor Hotel Group) from fellow Chinese company HNA Group in 2018.

== Subsidiaries ==
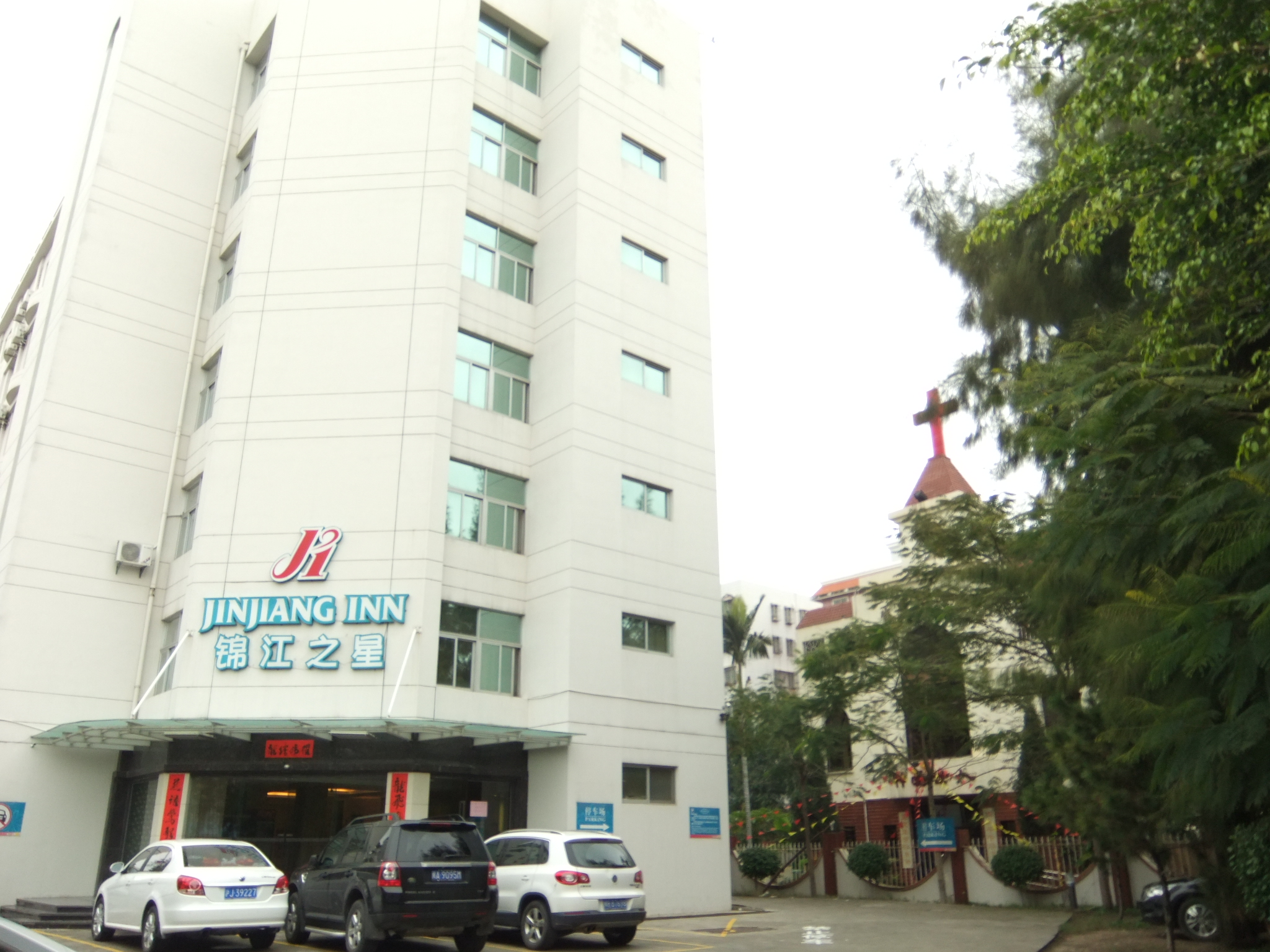
A Jinjiang Inn in Xiamen

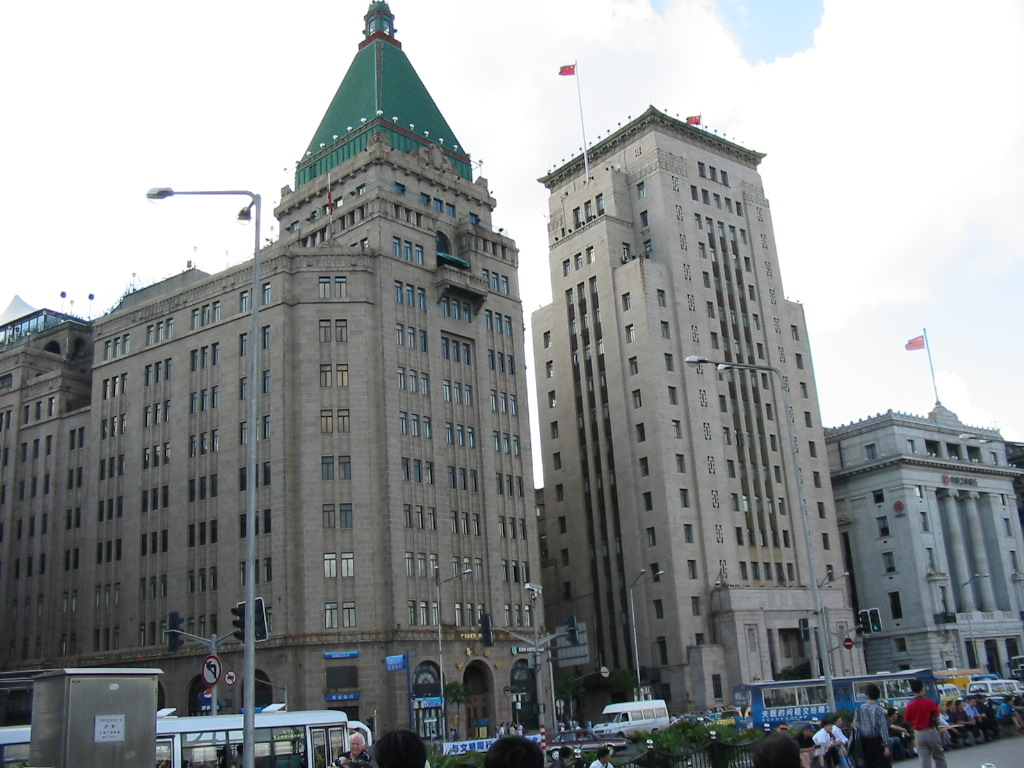
Peace Hotel in Shanghai

=== Jinjiang Hotels ===
Shanghai Jin Jiang International Hotels (Group) Company Limited (Jinjiang Hotels Group or Jinjiang Hotels in short) is the largest hotel group in China. It has more than 380 hotels and inns affiliated to it and under its management in major Chinese cities, including Peace Hotel and Jinjiang Inns. (Note: simplified Chinese: 锦江之星; traditional Chinese: 錦江之星; lit. 'Jinjiang star') It is headquartered in Shanghai.

The Group's subsidiary company, Shanghai Jinjiang International Hotel Development Company Limited (SSE: 600754) was listed on the Shanghai Stock Exchange in 1996. Its holding company, Shanghai Jinjiang International Hotels (Group) Company Limited H shares (SEHK: 2006) was listed on the Hong Kong Stock Exchange in 2006. Jin Jiang International Hotel Management Company Ltd (锦江国际酒店管理有限公司) has its headquarters in Pudong.

=== Jinjiang Inns ===
The Jinjiang Inn Co., Ltd. (锦江之星旅馆有限公司) division has its headquarters in Minhang. The first two Jinjiang Inns in Metro Manila were scheduled to open in 2014.

=== Jinjiang Travel ===
Shanghai Jin Jiang Tours Co., Ltd., also known as Jinjiang Travel, (Note: 锦江旅游; 錦江旅遊; Jǐnjiāng Lǚyóu) is headquartered in Huangpu.

== Notes ==
Names in Chinese
