= PPHE Hotel Group =

International hospitality real estate group

- Company type: Public
- Traded as: LSE: PPH
- ISIN: GG00B1Z5FH87
- Industry: Hospitality and real estate
- Founded: 1989
- Headquarters: Guernsey (registered office)
- Key people: Kenneth Bradley, Chairman; Boris Ivesha, CEO
- Brands: Park Plaza Hotels, art'otel, Holmes Hotel London, Radisson Collection, Radisson RED, Arena Hotels, Arena Campsites
- Revenue: ▲£466.4 million (2025)
- Operating income: ▼£65.9 million (2025)
- Net income: ▼£0.6 million (2025)
- Total assets: ▲£1,921.8 million (2025)
- Total equity: ▼£512.6 million (2025)
- Website: pphe.com

PPHE Hotel Group Limited, formerly Park Plaza Hotels Europe, is an international hospitality real estate group. It is listed on the London Stock Exchange and is a constituent of the FTSE 250 Index.

== History ==
The company was established by Eli Papouchado, an Israeli property developer, in 1989. It was floated on the Alternative Investment Market in 2007 and it signed a contract to open 20 hotels in Russia in 2008.

In 2010, it opened a c.1,000-bedroom Park Plaza Hotel at Westminster Bridge in London and, in 2013, it opened a 107-bedroom art’otel branded hotel in Amsterdam. Further recent openings include art'otel London Battersea Power Station (2022) and art'otel London Hoxton (2024).
