= Travel management company =

Company which manages another organization's travel provision

A travel management company (TMC) is a travel agency which manages organizations' corporate or business travel programs. Such companies will often provide an end-user online booking tool, mobile application, program management, and consulting teams, executive travel services, meetings and events support, reporting functionality, duty of care, and more. Non-Profit travel management companies also provide services to manage complex visa requirements, pre-trip medical needs, remote area travel, and immediate disaster relief planning. These companies use Global Distribution Systems (GDS) such as Amadeus, Galileo, Sabre, Worldspan etc. to book flights for their clients. This allows the travel consultant to compare different itineraries and costs by displaying availability in real-time, allowing users to access fares for air tickets, hotel rooms and rental cars simultaneously.

Some major TMCs include American Express Global Business Travel (which includes Egencia and Ovation Travel Group), AmTrav, BCD Group, CTM, CWT (formerly Carlson Wagonlit Travel), FCM Travel Solutions, Navan, Snowfall, and Travelperk. There are also several training institutions which provides Travel Management training which also includes GDS such as Air Grace Aviation Academy, YMCA, IGNOU in Delhi
