= Lanes & Planes =

German travel management company

- Type: Private
- Industry: Corporate Travel Management
- Founded: 2017
- Headquarters: München; Germany
- Website: lanes-planes.com

Lanes & Planes is a Munich-based company that provides business travel management software. The company offers a platform designed for booking, expense reporting, and financial system integration for corporate clients. Lanes & Planes has received over $45 million in funding to support the development and expansion of its services.

== History ==
Lanes & Planes was founded in Munich in 2017 by Veit Blumschein and Daniel Nolte, who had met at RWTH Aachen University. The two had earlier founded the travel search platform fromAtoB, whose business was taken over by the motorway services operator Tank & Rast in March 2018 after the company became insolvent. In 2018 PhocusWire profiled the company in its Europe Travel Battleground startup series.

In 2020 the company raised a $10 million Series A round led by Battery Ventures, with DN Capital and Connect Ventures participating. In October 2023 it closed a $35 million (€33.2 million) Series B led by Smash Capital, with Battery Ventures, Coparion, DN Capital and All Iron Ventures participating. At the end of 2025 the Spanish bank BBVA provided a double-digit million euro venture debt facility, partly guaranteed by the European Investment Fund under the InvestEU programme. At that time the company reported more than 1,500 business customers.

== Operations ==
Lanes & Planes combines a self-developed online booking tool with a human travel agency service, and uses Amadeus as its global distribution system. In Business Travel News Europe's 2025 ranking of Europe's leading travel management companies it placed 42nd in Europe and ninth in Germany, with gross sales of €130 million in 2024.

== See also ==
- TravelPerk
- Navan
- SAP Concur
- Serko
- Snowfall
