= Corporate Travel Management (company) =

Australian travel management company

- Type: Public
- Traded as: ASX: CTD
- Industry: Corporate Travel Management
- Headquarters: Brisbane, Australia
- Area served: Worldwide
- Website: travelctm.com

Corporate Travel Management Ltd is a corporate travel management company.

== History ==
The company expanded into North America in 2020 following the acquisition of an Omaha-based TMC called Travel & Transport.

On 26 February 2021, the UK-based Good Law Project reported that CTM had been awarded two COVID-19-related contracts with the UK government.

In December 2021, CTM announced the acquisition of the Helloworld Travel Group's corporate and entertainment brands.

In June 2023, the Independent reported CTM had been awarded a £1.6 billion contract to house asylum-seekers in the UK, including on barges. The Bibby Stockholm barge, subcontracted by CTM at Portland Port, Dorset, began housing asylum-seekers on 7 August 2023, amid concerns about fire risks and other safety concerns. On 11 August 2023, the 39 asylum-seekers accommodated on the Bibby Stockholm were evacuated following positive tests for legionella on board.

In July 2023, ethical fund Future Superhas told Guardian Australia it would 'divest its holdings in CTM due to concerns' over the CTM's involvement in the Bibby Stockholm.

In February 2026, CEO James Pherous resigned. In 2026, CTM recognised that it had overcharged the UK government £118 million for operating the Bibby Stockholm, and was negotiating commercial arrangements to refund.

== See also ==
- American Express GBT
- BCD Travel
- Navan
- Snowfall
- TravelPerk
