= Hogg Robinson Group =

Corporate travel management company

- Industry: Corporate travel management
- Founded: 1845; 181 years ago
- Founder: Francis Hogg; Augustus Robinson
- Defunct: 19 July 2018; 7 years ago
- Fate: Acquired by American Express Global Business Travel
- Headquarters: Basingstoke, United Kingdom

Hogg Robinson Group was a business active in the insurance and latterly the corporate travel management sectors. It was acquired by American Express Global Business Travel in July 2018.

== History ==
Hogg Robinson Group was established in 1845, by brothers in law Francis Hogg, a young wine merchant, and Augustus Robinson, an insurance broker.

The partnership developed mercantile and insurance interests from offices in Birchin Lane in the City of London. Its travel business was established after World War II. By 1984, it was one of the four largest travel agency operators in the United Kingdom, and included the chains Wakefield Fortune and Blue Star, as well as the shops of Hogg Robinson.

In June 1993, the retail division was sold to Airtours (later MyTravel Group). Airtours merged it with Pickfords Travel, acquired by Airtours from Pickfords in September 1992, to form Going Places (later Thomas Cook Group). In 1997, new chairman Neville Bain led the sale of Hogg Robinson's transport division and the acquisition of two business travel operations. In June 1998, it acquired 51% of Rider Travel of Canada.

In June 2000, chief executive David Radcliffe led a £232 million management buyout funded by Schroder Ventures (now Permira). Hogg Robinson divested of various of its insurance broking businesses in 2001.

In October 2006, the company expanded in Halifax, Nova Scotia. In April 2007, the company expanded its office space in Charlotte, North Carolina. In March 2012, the company acquired Spendvision. In February 2015, it was rebranded as Fraedom.

In May 2017, the company acquired eWings.com, a travel management company for small to medium sized companies. In February 2018, the company sold Fraedom to Visa Inc. for $195 million. On July 19, 2018, American Express Global Business Travel acquired the company for approximately £400 million.

The Hogg Robinson name remains in active use in Nigeria, where the 1974 establishment of Hogg Robinson Nigeria Limited is now operating independently of the former UK parent and continues as an insurance broker.
