= Haroche =

Haroche is a surname. Notable people with the surname include:

- Gilbert Haroche (1927–2015), American entrepreneur and businessman
- Raphaël Haroche (born 1975), French singer-songwriter and actor, and a nephew of Serge Haroche
- Serge Haroche (born 1944), French physicist
