= Gelco =

- Company type: Private
- Founded: 1894
- Headquarters: Eden Prairie, Minnesota
- Key people: Steve Singh, CEO and chairman of the board
- Website: www.concur.com/gelco

Gelco was a business process management company specializing in employee expense management. It is now part of Concur Technologies.

== History ==
In 1894, Edgar A. Walz set out to solve a financial dilemma of the times: the proliferation of debtors in the business travel industry known as "beats" who would skip out before paying their lodging bills. Walz, who had traveled the Southwest United States as a telegraph operator, cashier, bookkeeper, and cattle rancher, created a company named the National Debtor Record Company.

The National Debtor Record Company introduced a nationwide hotel credit service named Credit Letter and it successor the TravelCard designed to meet the needs of the increasingly mobile sales force and rapid business expansion around the turn of that century. In 1941, the company changed its name to Traveletter Corporation and introduced the Traveletter service. In 1965, the Traveletter Corporation began a service managing trade promotion funds (the monies paid to retailers to promote a manufacturer's product).

Walz sold the Traveletter Corporation in 1972 to the General Equipment Leasing Corporation (Gelco), which moved the company headquarters from Connecticut to Minnesota. In 1981, Gelco changed the former Traveletter Corporation business to Gelco Payment Systems. In 1986, General Electric Capital bought Gelco Payment Systems. In 1987 Gelco Payment Systems released their first PC/DOS-based software package for expense management called Vectr, providing their customers an automated solution to accept and process electronic bank draft transactions on their desktop. That same year, Gelco Payment Systems became a privately held company and changed its name again to Gelco PayNetwork. The Harper Group then acquired Gelco and formed H-G Holdings, Inc. In 1995, Gelco acquired Federal Software Inc and their civilian federal government travel services Travel Lightning and Travel Manager. Gelco PayNetwork changed its name to Gelco Information Network (comprising Gelco Expense Network and Gelco Promotion Network) and released its third PC-based automated expense-reporting system, ExpenseLink, in 1996. In the later 1990s, Gelco released these products delivered as software as a service.

In 2000, Gelco Information Network announced that the company's two operational groups, Trade Management and Expense Management, would operate as separate companies as the Gelco Trade Management Group and the Gelco Expense Management Group. Gelco Expense Management has thousands of clients worldwide representing over 625,000 users of their on-demand services, processing over 9 million transactions and making over $7 billion in payments annually.

In 2007, H-G Holdings and its subsidiaries, including Gelco Information Network, were acquired by Concur Technologies.
