= London Vichy Pullman Express =

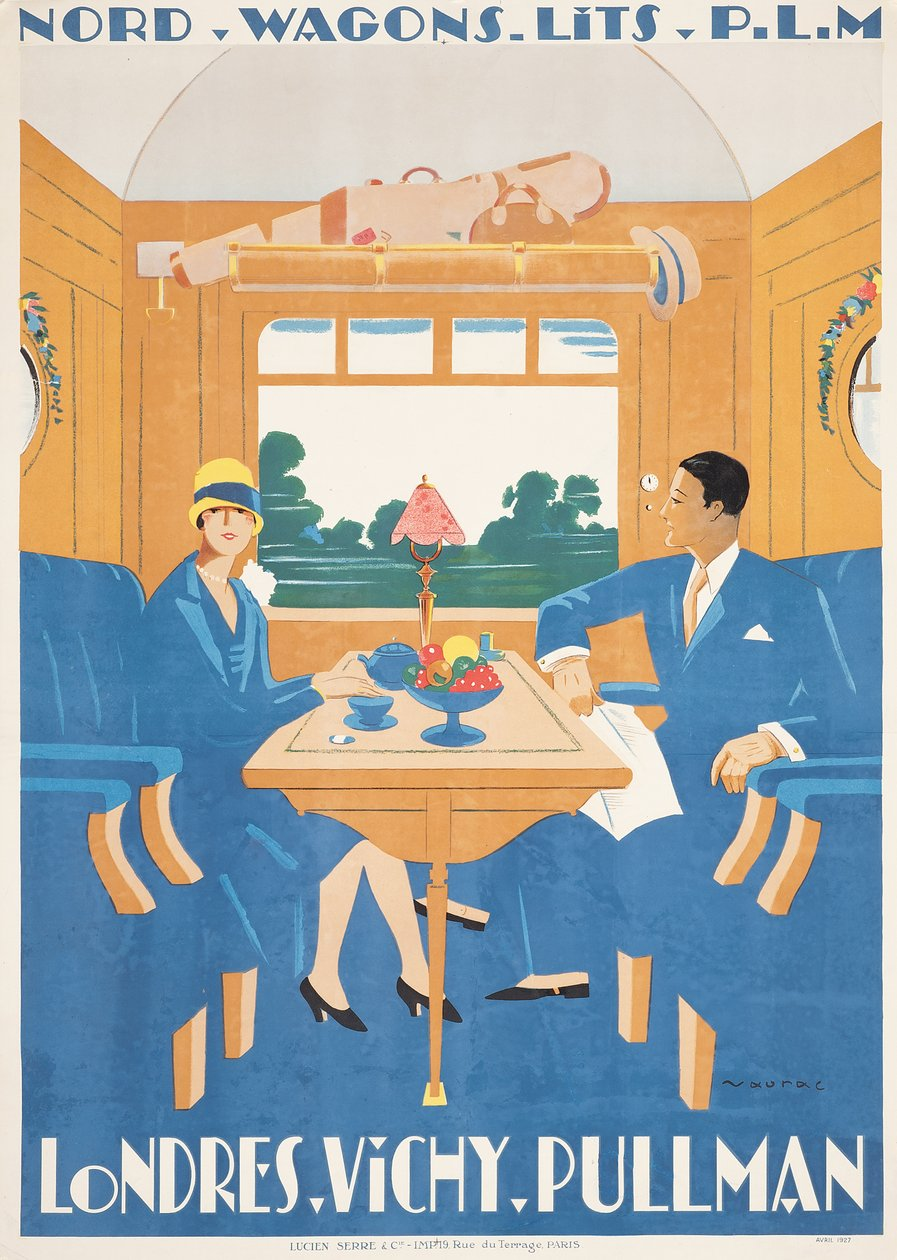
1927 advert by Jean Raoul Naurac promoting the Londres-Vichy Pullman service.

The Londres-Vichy Pullman Express was a Pullman train that ran between London and Vichy in France primarily to serve passengers wishing to visit the thermal baths for which Vichy was famous. The Compagnie Internationale des Wagons-Lits established the service on 14 May 1927.

It was a seasonal train. From 1927 to 1930 the through coaches from Boulogne to Vichy were first class; second class coaches and goods vans were added to the train at Paris-Nord. The train transferred from Paris-Nord to Paris-Lyon via the 'little circle'.

From 1928 Étoile du Nord carriages were used on the Paris-Vichy section.

The service ended on 19 September 1930. From then until 1939 ordinary trains served the Boulogne-Vichy route.

The service was an early victim of the Great Depression. The loss of demand ended a number of luxury trains.
