= Student marketing =

Marketing to students

Student marketing refers to the promotion of products, brands and ideas to higher and further education students.

Marketing material directed at students must overcome several problems: they have little money; they are a transient population who will soon graduate, cease to be students, and possibly move away; and they tend to be a skeptical audience critical towards marketing messages and fake attempts to be cool.

However students are also an attractive market: while they do have a restricted budget many are living away from home and are therefore making independent choices over which brands to buy for the very first time. Hence they are often excited about making purchases that would be mundane for older consumers.

When it comes to targeting, students have in the past been considered an elusive group, with much of their time taken up on campus and through socialising. Traditional forms of advertising, such as mainstream radio, TV and billboard advertising campaigns, are not ideal channels for reaching today’s students. Therefore, other media are targeted, such as smartphone advertising and social media. Equally, marketers can take advantage of students' concentration at geographical locations (colleges) and use techniques such as campus visits and college street teams.

== United Kingdom ==
Students in the UK are estimated to spend over £13 billion a year, making them a key market for consumer brands.

Some UK universities have moved to ban advertising they consider harmful to students, such as for payday loan companies.

== United States ==
Certain agencies have focused on advertising to college students, such as Student Advantage, which operated a membership-card based program in the 1990s and moved into the internet, and which in 1998 bought rival Collegiate Advantage. Other online services such as Student Beans and StudentUniverse provide students with access to student discounts from various retailers and brands. US universities spent $1.6 B in advertising in 2016. This amount is for bachelors and Graduate programs.
