= Compagnie Internationale des Wagons-Lits =

French railway car company

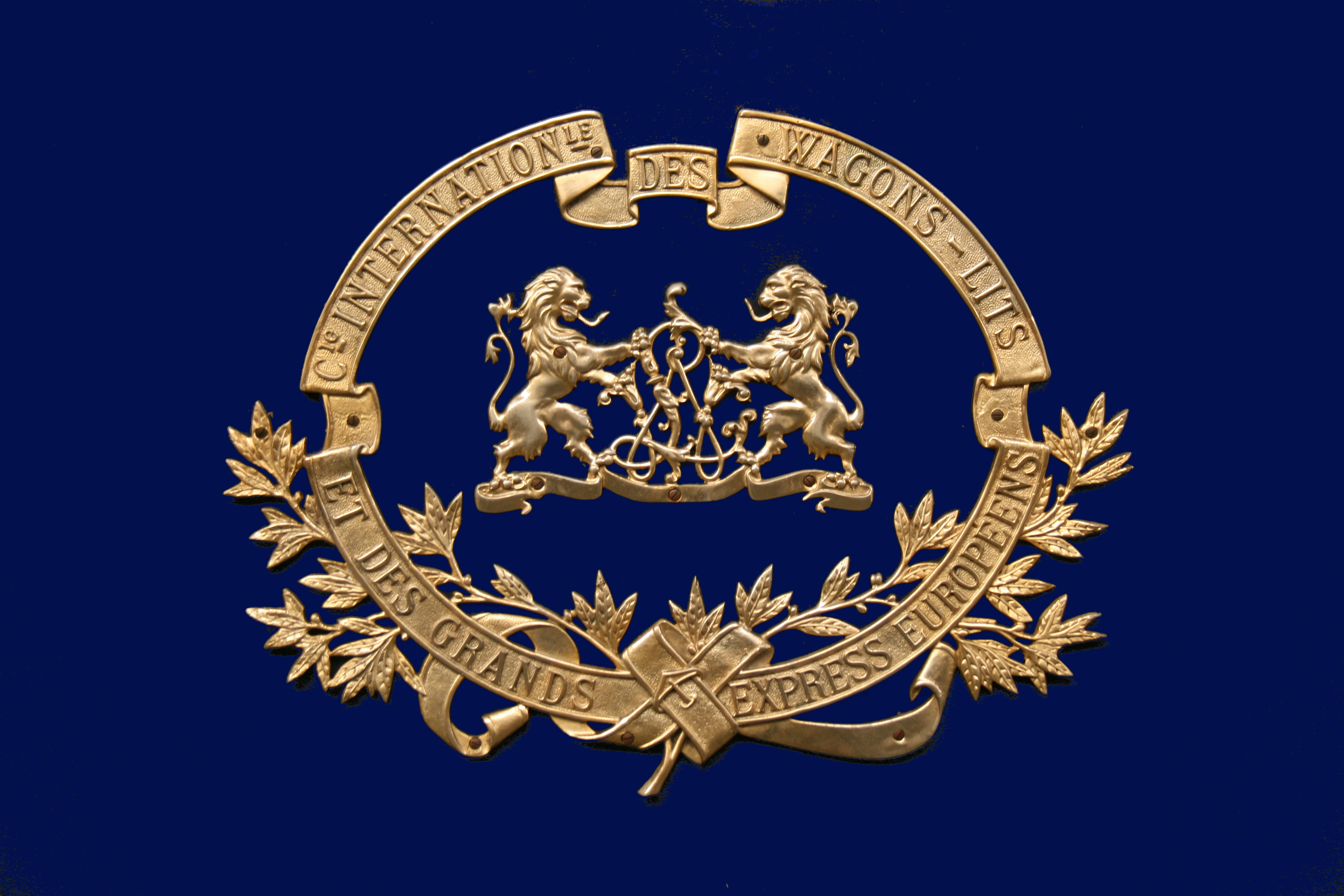
- Logo prior to its acquisition by Newrest
- Type: Société anonyme
- Industry: Railway
- Founded: 1872
- Founder: Georges Nagelmackers
- Headquarters: Paris, France
- Owner: Newrest (since 2010)

Compagnie Internationale des Wagons-Lits (Note: See name history) (CIWL; French pronunciation: [kɔ̃paɲi ɛ̃tɛʁnɑsjɔnal de vaɡɔ̃ li]; lit. 'International Sleeping-Car Company') is a Belgian-founded French company known for providing and operating luxury trains with sleepers and dining cars during the late 19th and the 20th centuries, most notably the Orient Express. Founded by Georges Nagelmackers in 1872, CIWL developed an international network of trains beginning in Europe, and later expanding to Asia and Africa. The trains provided luxury and comfort at a time when travelling was still rough and dangerous. The Armistice with Germany was signed in a CIWL train carriage, the Compiègne Wagon, on November 11, 1918.

== History ==
=== Founding ===
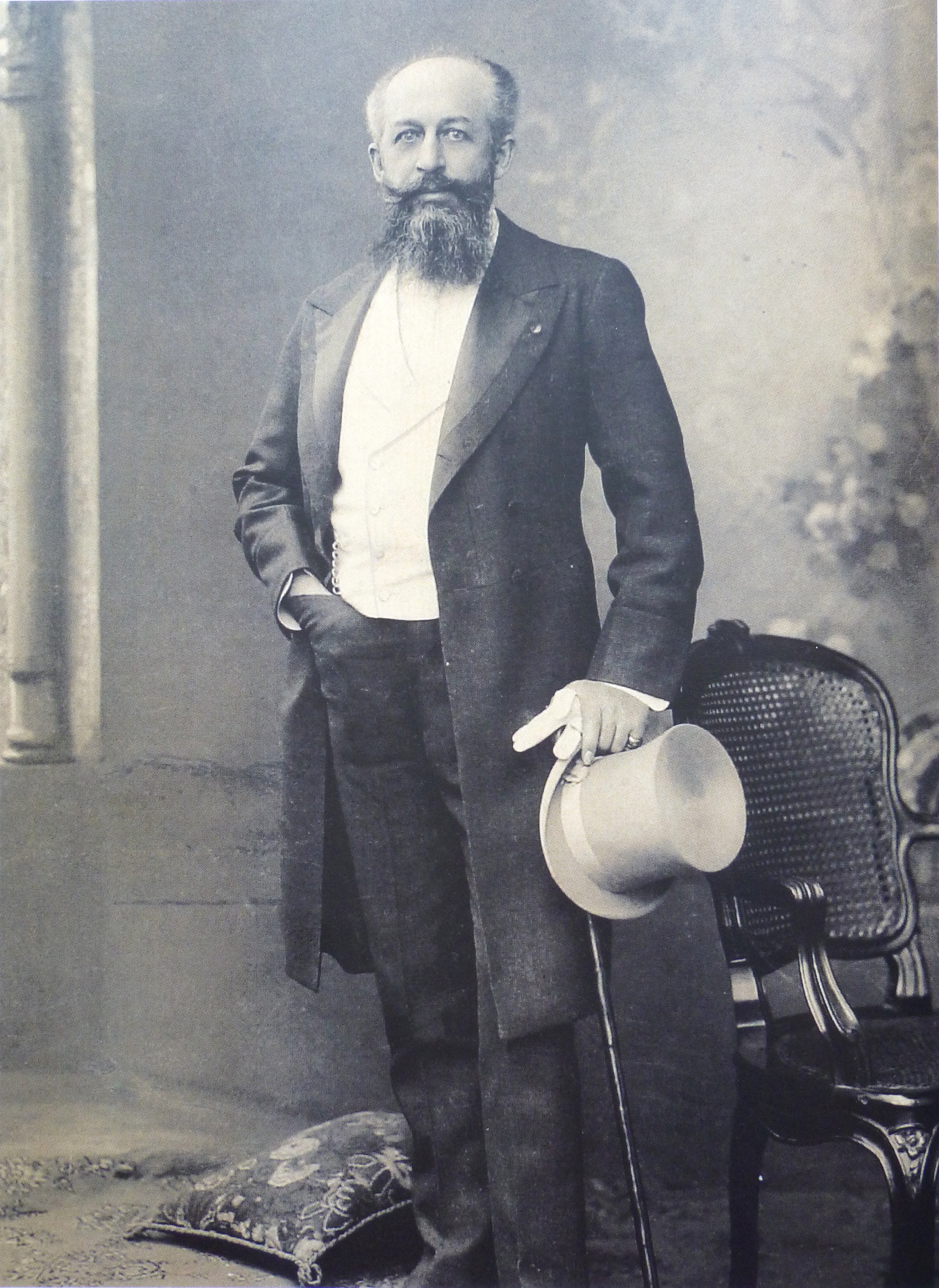
Georges Nagelmackers, founder of the CIWL

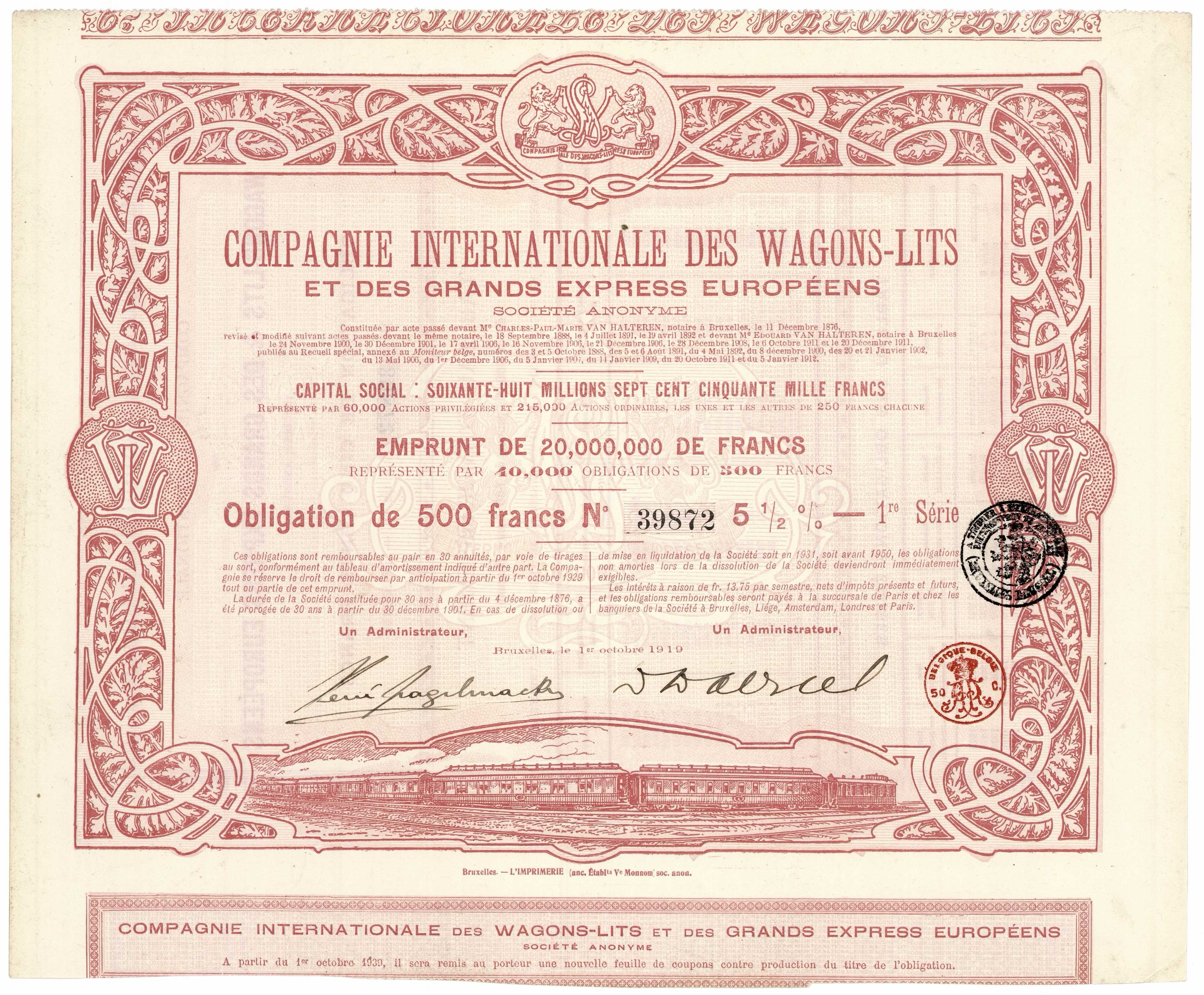
Bond of the Comp. Internationale des Wagon-Lits et des Grands Express Européens S.A., issued 1. October 1919

During his trip to the United States in 1867–1868 the 23-year-old Belgian Georges Nagelmackers was impressed by the Pullman night trains. Upon his return home, he decided to establish a network of such trains in Europe. He envisioned that such trains should be luxurious and travel across borders.

In 1872, Nagelmackers founded the Compagnie Internationale des Wagons-Lits and the et des Grands Express Européens addition became part of the name in 1893. By 1886 his company had become the main organiser for most European heads of state. The symbol "WL" held by two lions became a well-known trade mark.

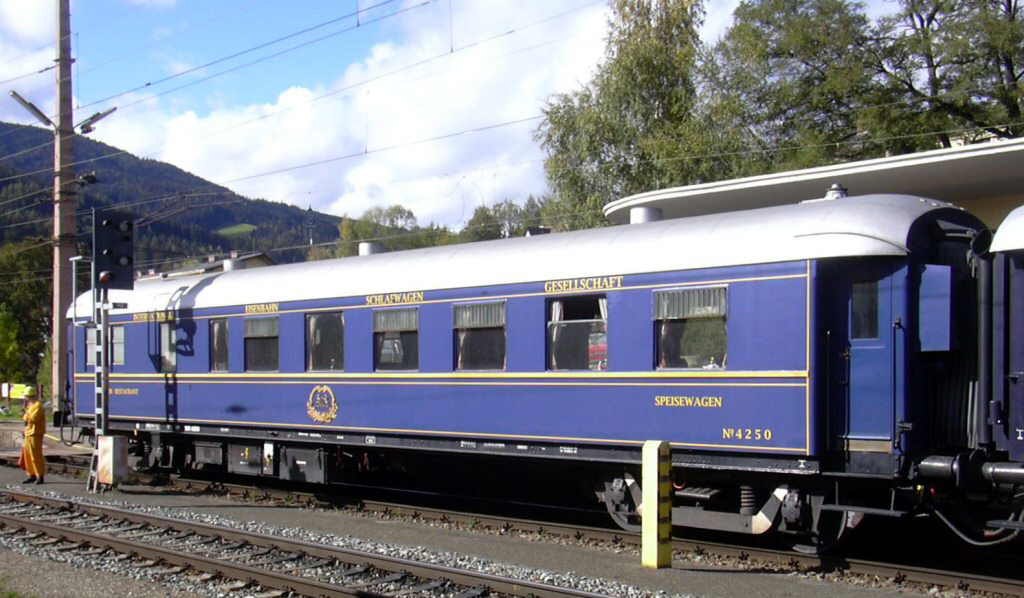
Historic Wagons-Lits restaurant car in Austria in 2003.

The company ran either complete trains of Wagon-Lits cars or individual sleeping and dining cars coupled onto services operated by the state railways of the European countries through which the Wagon-Lits cars passed. These cars were always drawn by locomotives of the various state railways, as Wagon-Lits did not operate its own fleet of locomotives.

Prior to World War I, CIWL held a monopoly being the only group catering to the needs of the international railroad traveller. The company introduced famous services, such as the Orient Express, the Nord Express, and the Sud Express and expanded to markets outside Europe with involvement in the Trans-Siberian Railway across Russia. The Company's trains also reached Manchuria (Trans-Manchurian Express), China (Peking, Shanghai, and Nanking), and Cairo.

==== Hotels ====
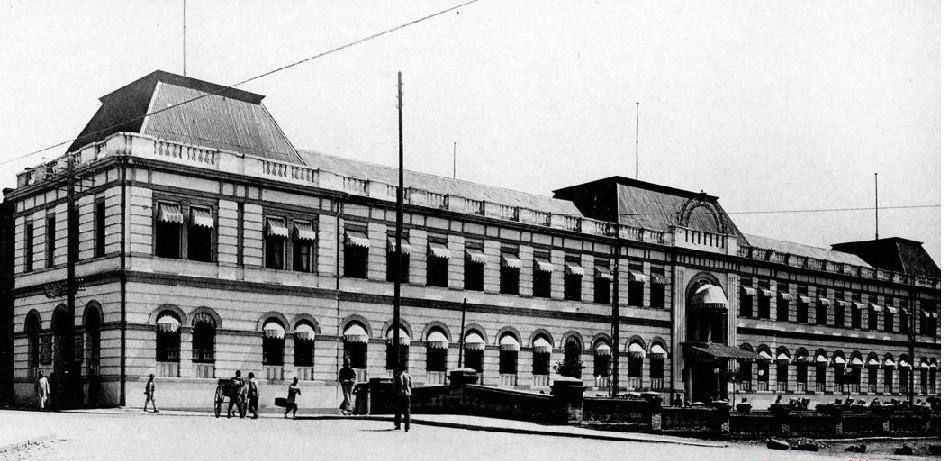
The Grand Hôtel des Wagons-Lits, also known as the Six Nations Hotel, in Beijing before 1949.

In 1894, Compagnie Internationale des Grands Hotels was founded as a subsidiary and began operating a chain of luxury hotels in major cities. Among these were the Hôtel Terminus in Bordeaux and Marseille, the Hôtel Pera Palace in Istanbul, the Hôtel de la Plage in Ostend, and the Grand Hôtel des Wagons-Lits in Beijing (Peking).

==== Taxi Service ====
At the end of 1909 the company received an approval to operate taxi services in major cities of India. Automobiles Darracq France then known Darracq Co was contracted to provide 3,000 units of 1910 models powered by 14-16 hp engines.

=== Competition with Mitropa ===
With the start of World War I CIWL's coaches were confiscated for military use. In Germany and Austro-Hungary Mitropa was founded to take over the property and services of CIWL. In 1919, the communists in Russia expropriated CIWL's local rolling stock and hotels. After the conclusion of World War I CIWL demanded to have its central European service routes restored. It regained these for Austria, Poland, and Czechoslovakia; however, in Germany the Reichsbahn and Mitropa sabotaged this process. On April 23, 1925, CIWL and Mitropa agreed to separate spheres of influence. CIWL received transit routes through Germany and routes between Germany and Belgium, France, Italy, Poland, Latvia, Lithuania and Czechoslovakia. Mitropa took over the routes between Germany and the Netherlands and Scandinavia, as well as trains within Germany, and to Gdańsk. Trains between Germany and Austria were served by both companies.

In the interwar period, CIWL flourished again. The company's blue and gold livery was introduced. In 1925, Wagon-Lits opened its first Travel Palace in Paris. Services extended to the Middle Eastern cities of Aleppo, Baghdad, Cairo, and Tehran. Metal coaches, replacing older wooden ones constructed of teak, became available in 1926. In 1931 the fleet reached its maximum of 2268 vehicles. This period can be considered the zenith of luxury rail travel. CIWL's carriages were decorated by such renowned artists as Réné Prou, René Lalique and Morrison. CIWL also commissioned renowned artists such as Adolphe Mouron Cassandre to design posters advertising its services.

=== Decline ===
With Anschluss in 1938, the Austrian market was lost to Mitropa (it was recovered after 1945). Because of World War II and the subsequent communist expansion, CIWL lost more markets in central and eastern Europe.

After World War II, CIWL increasingly focused on the travel agency and management business. Accordingly, it was renamed Compagnie Internationale des Wagons-Lits et du Tourisme (CIWLT) in 1967.

By 1971, the rolling stock of CIWL had become aged and outdated, and the renovation and replacement needed were beyond the company. It sold or leased its coaches to the SNCF, FS, SBB, DB, ÖBB, NMBS/SNCB, NS, DSB and Renfe. An international sleeping car pool named TEN (Trans Euro Night) was founded at that time and took over and managed (until 1995) many of the carriages of CIWL and of the Mitropa-successor DSG.

=== Today ===
Wagons-Lits is headquartered in Paris. Currently CIWL provides service on night trains in Austria, Italy and meal and catering services in daytime trains of France, Italy, Portugal and on Eurostar services to the United Kingdom.

A number of sleeping-cars on the European continent are owned by CIWL. The cars are maintained by the sister company Rail Service International (RSI) in the Netherlands and leased to train operating companies.

== Ownership ==
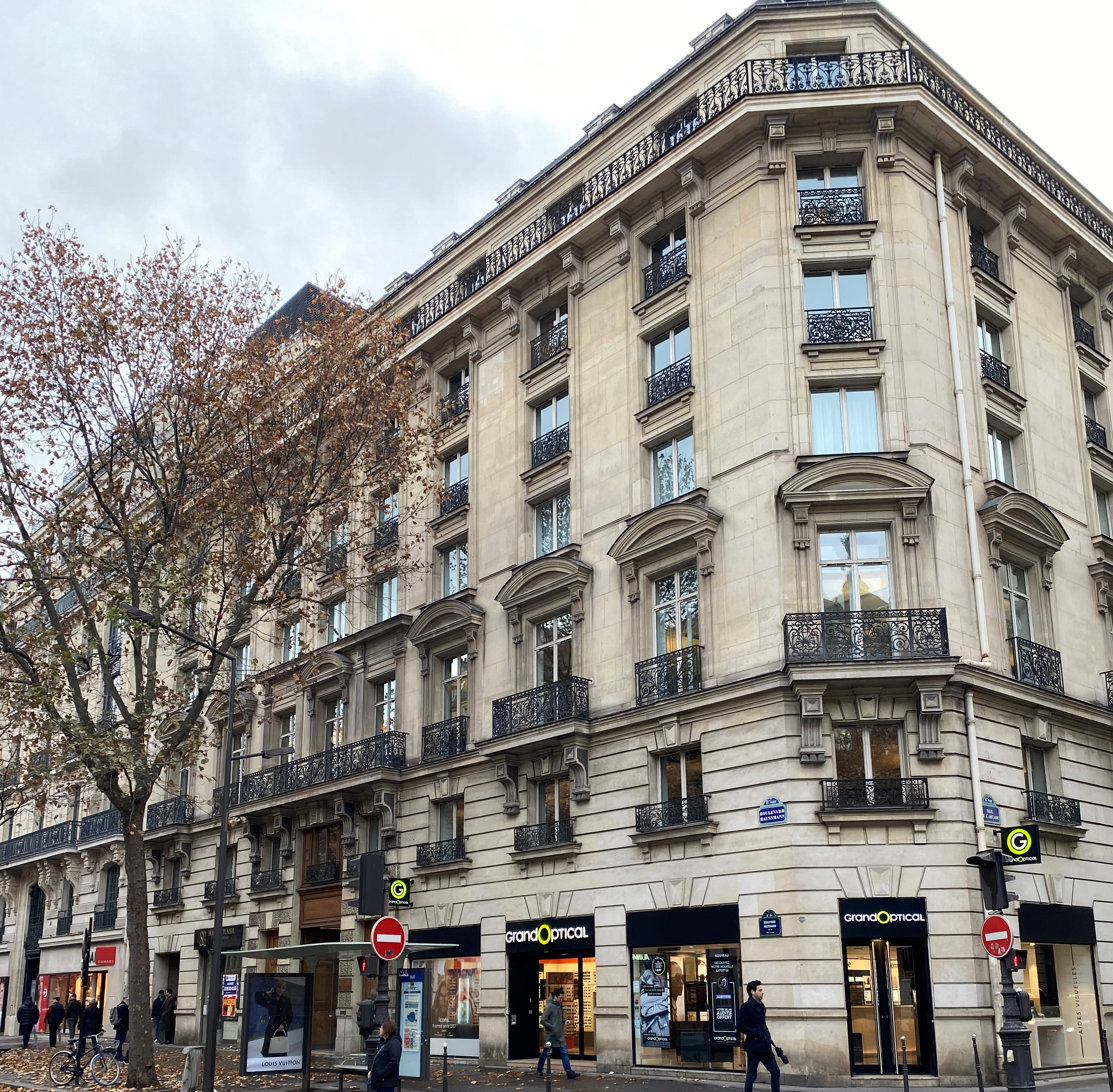
Building at 69, boulevard Haussmann in Paris, head office of CIWL until 1988

=== Thomas Cook ===
In 1927, Thomas Cook was sold to CIWL after poor financial results; CIWL took a back-role in the running of the subsidiary.

=== Accor ===
In 1991, Wagons-Lits became part of the French multi-national Accor Hotel and Leisure Group.

At the time, CIWL included the hotel brands Altea, Arcade, Etap, PLM and Pullman. Catering organisation Eurest and, in the automobile world, Wagons-Lits included Europcar rental and motorway break specialists Relais Autoroute.

Following the 1992 purchase, the Pullman hotels were gradually rebranded to Sofitel, allowing the Pullman name to be reused in 2007 for a new class of conference hotel. Sixty-eight existing Accor hotels will be transferred over, including some Sofitel that were originally Pullman hotels.

In May 2011, Accor announced plans to auction residual historic assets of Wagons-Lits, including posters and tableware.

In 2018, Accor began renovation work on 17 CIWL carriages from the defunct Nostalgie Istanbul Orient Express, which date back to the 1920s and 1930s, to create their own Orient Express.

=== Wagons-Lits Diffusion ===
In 1996, all copyrights and trademarks concerning the use of historical brands and archive photographs were transferred to Wagons-Lits Diffusion in Paris. Wagons-Lits Diffusion manages the historic brands and logos derived from Compagnie des Wagons-Lits past activities.

=== Newrest Group International ===
In 2010, the rail catering operations of Wagons-Lits were transferred from Accor to the catering company Newrest Group International, since then operating under the name Newrest Wagons-Lits.

=== Carlson Wagonlit Travel ===
In 1997, the Europe business travel and leisure retail arm of Wagons-Lits (Wagonlit Travel) was merged on an equal basis with that of Carlson Travel Network (operating in the United States). The result was a new company called "Carlson Wagonlit Travel" jointly owned by Accor and Carlson Holdings Inc., the former parent companies of the merged entities.

The Carlson side of the merger had grown from a travel agency founded by Ward Forster in the United States in 1888. Originally called "Ask Mr. Foster Travel Agency", the chain was renamed to "Carlson Travel Network" following an earlier purchase by the Carlson Group and later to CWT.

Accor sold its 50% of Carlson Wagonlit Travel in 2006 for €500m to Carlson and One Equity Partners. However, Accor maintains its interest in the railway service sector of Wagon Lits.

== Famous CIWL trains ==
=== Orient Express ===
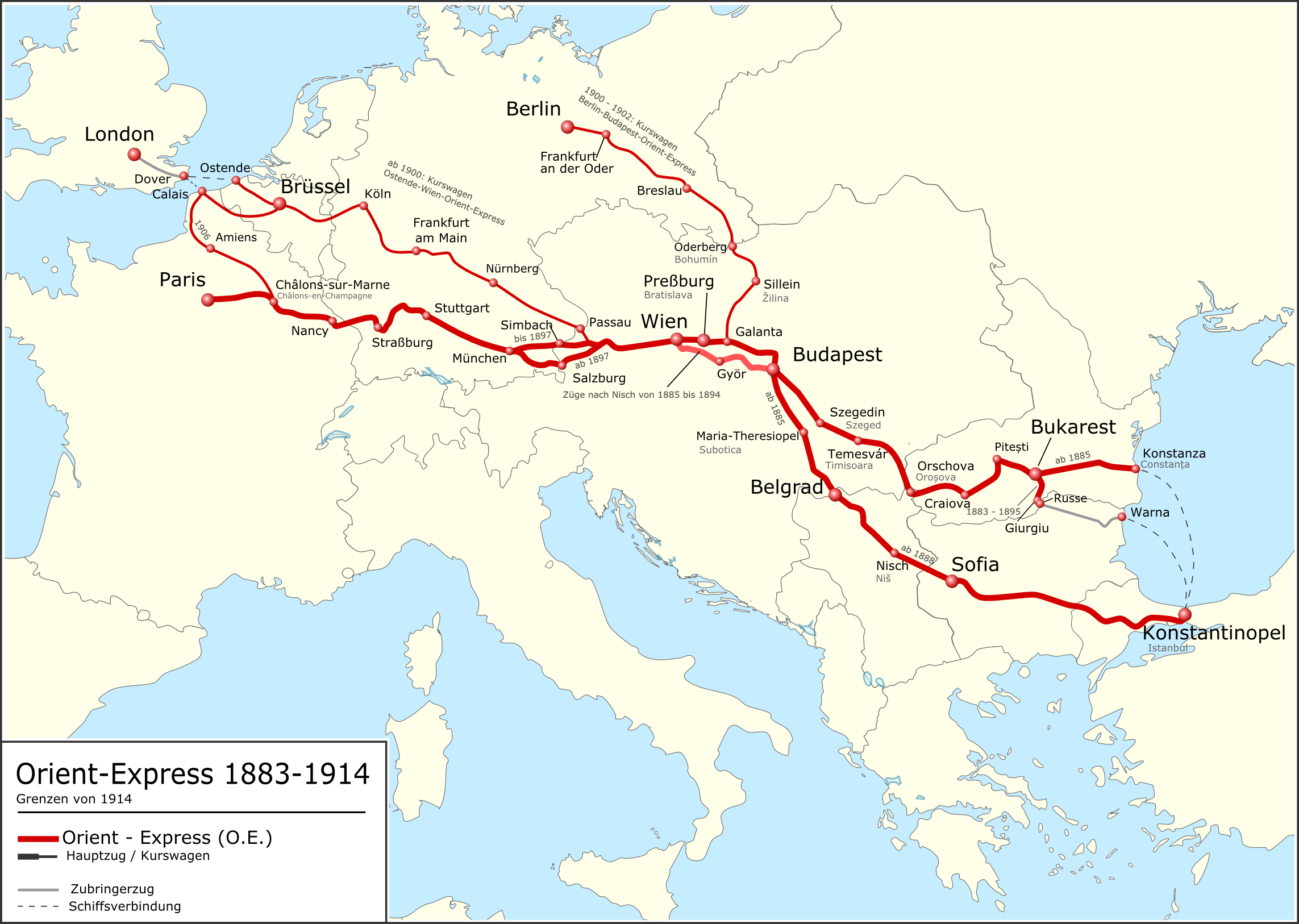
The Orient Express network from 1883 to 1914

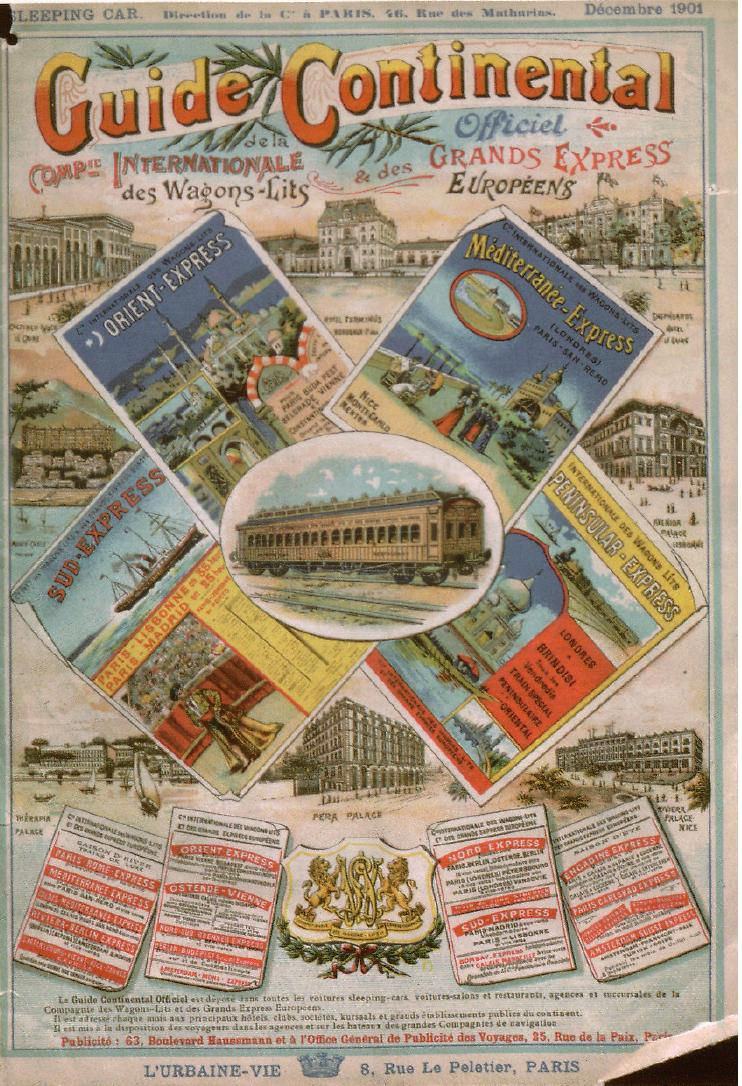
CIWL's network guide, December 1901

From 1883, the Orient Express operated between Paris and Istanbul in three nights and three times per week in each direction. The Orient Express deployed the first sleeping and dining cars for long-distance train travel in Europe. In 2003, the company restored seven cars of the famous Pullman Orient Express and made it available for tourist events. After 2007, the night sleeper service named Orient Express only operated between Strasbourg and Vienna. Made obsolete by Europe's high-speed rail network, the Orient Express made its last run on 14 December 2009.

=== Nord Express ===
The Northern Express connected Paris with St. Petersburg (later Riga), via Germany, Poland and Eastern Europe. Begun in 1884, the service was run by DB NachtZug from Paris as far as Hamburg, although it previously served Copenhagen, until 2016.

The famous Art Deco poster "Nord Express: (1927) by Cassandre (Adolphe Mouron Cassandre) shows a stylised version of the train that traveled from London and Paris to Riga and Warsaw (Varsovie)

=== Sud Express ===
The Southern Express connected Paris–Lisbon starting in 1887, to provide the second-half of the through connection from St. Petersburg (Finland/Russia) via Paris to the west coast of Portugal. In Lisbon, travellers could transfer to trans-Atlantic steamships.

=== Blue Train ===
The Blue Train linked Paris/Calais–Southern France overnight and used Wagons-Lits cars up until 1938. It was actually operated by French company called Chemins de fer de Paris à Lyon et à la Méditerranée.

=== Trans-Siberian Express ===
The Trans-Siberian Express operated with the permission of the Russian Tsar until 1917 during World War I. The service ran from Moscow to Vladivostok and Peking, taking over one week in each direction.

=== Night Ferry ===
The Night Ferry was a through London Victoria to Paris Gare du Nord overnight boat train. Wagons-Lits operated the service from October 1936 until December 1976 with specially constructed cars designed to fit the smaller British loading gauge. It was taken over by British Rail in January 1977, before ceasing in October 1980. Before the introduction of high-speed Eurostar services, this was the only through service. The train's English Channel segment between Dover and Dunkirk was made by train ferry.

=== London Vichy Pullman Express ===
The Londres-Vichy Pullman Express ran between London and Vichy in France primarily to serve visitors to Vichy's famous thermal baths. Compagnie Internationale des Wagons-Lits operated the service from 14 May 1927 until 19 September 1930.

== List of CIWL services ==
Basic data is listed. Further details are in the article regarding the specific train.

Train	Route	Introduced
Amsterdam-Engadine Express	"Amsterdam-Frankfurt-Basel-Coire"	1901
Amsterdam-Mons Express	"Amsterdam and The Hague-Mons"	1899
Anatolian Express	"Haydarpaşa-Ankara"	1927
Andalus Express	"Madrid-Seville"	1911
Andalus Pullman Express	"Granada-Seville-Málaga"	1929
Ankara Express	"Haydarpaşa-Ankara"	1945
Arlberg Oriënt Express	"Paris and Calais-Vienna-Bucharest"	1931
Ägypten Express	"Berlin-Naples"	1907
Barcelone Express	"Paris-Barcelona"	1929
Berlin-Budapest (Oriënt) Express	"Berlin-Budapest-Constantinople"	1900
Berlin-Engadin Express	"Berlin-Basel-Coire"	1911
Berlin-Karlsbad-Marienbad Express	"Berlin-Karlsbad-Marienbad"	1907
Berlin-Marienbad-Karlsbad-Wien Express	"Berlin-Marienbad-Karlsbad-Vienna"	1904
Berlin-Neapel Express	"Berlin-Naples"	1902
Berlin-Schweiz Express		1901
Berlin-Tirol-Roma Express	"Berlin-Merano-Rome"	1912
Bombay Express	"Calais-Marseille"	1897
Boulogne/Paris/Ostende-Strasbourg-Vienne Express	"Boulogne and Paris and Ostend-Strasbourg-Vienna"	1920
Boulogne/Paris/Ostende-Strasbourg-Prague-Varsovie Express	"Boulogne and Paris and Ostend-Prague-Warsaw"	1920
Cabourg Express	"Paris-Cabourg"	1904
Caïro-Luxor Express	"Cairo-Luxor"	1898
Calais-Bruxelles Pullman Express	"Calais-Brussels"	1927
Calais-Interlaken-Engadine Express	"Calais-Interlaken and Coire"	1895
Calais-Nice-Rome Express	"Calais-Paris-Nice-Rome"	1883
Calais-Nice Express	"Calais-Paris-Nice"	1884
Calais-Méditerranée Express	"London-Calais-Paris-Nice"	1886
Carlsbad Express	"Paris-Karlsbad"	1900
Carpati Pullman Express	"Bucharest-Brasov"	1929
Cataluña Express	"Madrid-Barcelona"	1943
Club Train	"London-Dover-Calais-Paris"	1889
Côte d'Argent Express	"Paris-Biarritz-Hendaye"	1910
Côte d'Azur Pullman Express	"Paris-Ventimiglia"	1929
Danmark Express	"Berlin-Warnemünde-Gedser-Copenhagen"	1907
Danubiu Pullman Express	"Bucharest-Galatz"	1932
Dauphiné-Savoie Express	"Paris-Evian and Chambéry and Geneva"	1904
Deauville Pullman Express	"Paris-Deauville"	1927
Dunarea Pullman Express	"Bucharest-Galatz"	1929
Edelweiss	"Amsterdam-Basel-Lucerne"	1928
Engadine Express	"Paris and Calais-Coire"	1925
Étoile du Nord	"Paris-Amsterdam"	1927
Flèche d'Or	"Paris-London"	1926
Fulger Regele Carol I	"Bucharest-Constanța"	1933
Gibraltar Express	"Paris-Algeciras"	1896
Golden Mountain Pullman Express	"Montreux-Zweisimmen"	1931
Gotthard Express	"Berlin-Basel-Milan-Genoa"	1911
Gotthard Pullman Express	"Basel-Zürich-Milan"	1927
Hendaye-Luchon Express	"Hendaye-Luchon"	1889
LLoyd Express	"Hamburg-Genoa"	1908
LLoyd & Riviera Express	"Hamburg-Genoa and Berlin-Ventimiglia"	1911
London Vichy Pullman Express	"Boulogne-Vichy"	1927
Luchon Express	"Paris-Luchon"	1898
Lusitania Express	"Madrid-Lisbon"	1943
Maroc Express	"Madrid-Algeciras"	1911
Marseille-Nice Express	"Marseille-Nice"	1889
Méditerranée Express	"Paris-Lyon-Marseille-San Remo"	1889
Milano-Ancona Pullman Express	"Milan-Ancona"	1927
Milano-Nizza Express	"Milan-San Remo-Cannes"	1925
Milano-Montecatini Express	"Milan-Montecatini"	1926
Milano-Venezia Express	"Milan-Venice"	1926
Napoli-Palermo Express	"Naples-Palermo"	1902
Nord Express	"Ostend and Paris-Berlin-Saint Petersburg"	1896
Nord Süd Brenner Express	"Berlin-Verona-Milan-Cannes"	1897
Nord Süd Gotthard Express	planned only	1898
Nederlandse LLoyd Express	"The Hague-Paris-Turin-Genoa"	1936
New York Express	"Paris-Cherbourg"	1900
Night Ferry	"London-Paris"	1936
Oberland Express	"Calais-Paris-Interlaken"	1906
Oberland-Léman Express	"Paris-St. Maurice and Bern"	1904
L'Oiseau Bleu	"Antwerp-Paris"	1929
Orient Express	"Paris-Istanbul" after WWII Paris-Prague-Warsaw/Budapest	1883
Ostende-Bad Kissingen Express	"Ostend-Bad Kissingen"	1910
Ostende-Karlsbad Express	"Ostend-Karlsbad"	1895
Ostende-Köln Pullman Express	"Ostend-Cologne"	1929
Ostende-Suisse Express	"Ostend-Strasbourg-Basel-Lucerne"	1901
Ostende-Wien Express	"Ostend-Vienna"	1894
Ostende-Wien-Constantza Express	"Ostend-Vienna-Constanța"	1895
Ostende-Wien-Orient Express	"Ostend-Vienna-Belgrade-Istanbul"	1925
Ostende-Wien-Triëst Express	"Ostend-Vienna-Trieste"	1895
P & O Overland Express	"London-Calais-Marseille"	1935
Paris-Aix les Bains Express	"Paris-Aix-les-Bains"	1903
Paris-Barcelone Express	"Paris-Barcelona"	1904
Paris-Bordeaux Express	"Paris-Bordeaux"	1889
Paris-Carlsbad-Prague Express	"Paris-Karlovy Vary-Prague"	1921
Paris-Côte Belge Pullman Express	"Paris-Ostend-Blankenberge-Knokke"	1928
Peninsular Express	"Calais-Brindisi"	1890
Puerta del Sol	"Paris-Madrid"	1969
Pyrénées Express	"Paris-Biarritz and Luchon"	1891
Pyrénées Côte d'Argent Express	"Paris-Biarritz-Irun"	1921
Riviera Express	"Marseille-Menton"	1897
Riviera-Napoli Express	"Berlin and Amsterdam-Cannes-Ventimiglia-Rapallo-Naples"	1931
Roma-Firenze-Cannes Express	"Rome-Florence-Cannes"	1908
Roma-Napoli Pullman Express	"Rome-Naples"	1929
Rome Express	"Calais-Paris-Florence and Rome"	1890
Rotterdamsche LLoyd Express	"Rotterdam-Marseille"	1936
Royan Express	"Paris-Royan"	1898
St. Petersburg-Wien-Nice-Cannes Express	"Saint Petersburg-Vienna-Nice-Cannes"	1898
Simplon Express	"Calais-Paris-Milan-Venice"	1906
Simplon Oriënt Express	"Calais-Paris-Milan-Trieste-Bucharest and Istanbul and Athens"	1919
Star of Egypt	"Cairo-Luxor-Shalla"	1929
Sud Express	"Paris-Madrid and Lisbon"	1887
Suisse Express	"Calais-Laon-Reims-Lucerne"	1891
Suisse Arlberg Express	"Paris and Calais-Vienna"	1924
Sunshine Pullman Express	"Cairo-Luxor-Shalla"	1929
Train Eclair	"Paris-Vienna"	1882
Taurus Express	"Haydarpaşa-Riyaq-Baghdad"	1930
Tirol Express	"Paris-Salzburg"	1936
Torino-Nizza-Cannes Pullman Express	"Turin-Nice-Cannes"	1927
Torino-Venezia Pullman Express	"Turin-Venice"	1928
Transatlantique Express	"Paris-Le Havre"	1900
Trans Mandchuria Express	"Vladivostok-Harbin-Changchun"	1921
Trans-Siberian Express	"Moscow-Tomsk"	1898
Trouville Express	"Paris-Trouville"	1886
Trouville Deauville Express	"Paris-Trouville-Deauville"	1923
Tunis-Oran Express	"Tunis-Constantine-Algiers-Oran"	1902
Vichy Express	"Paris-Vichy"	1904
Wien-Nizza-Cannes Express	"Vienna-Nice-Cannes"	1896
Wien-Roma-Napoli Express	"Vienna-Rome-Naples-Palermo and Taormina"	1911
Wien-San Remo-Nizza-Cannes Express	"Vienna-Sanremo-Nice-Cannes"	1923
Wien-Tirol-Riviera Express	"Vienna-Bolzano-Cannes"	1913

== 1918 Armistice coach ==
The 1918 Armistice with Germany was signed in CIWL #2419 ("Le Wagon de l'Armistice"). Returned to CIWL service afterwards, it was retired later to join the French presidential train before being withdrawn in 1921 and placed on display in the Cour des Invalides, Paris until 1927, when it was moved to Compiègne for display. It remained on display in its own building, the Clairiere de l'Armistice until 1940, when it was removed by the German army and used to receive the 1940 Armistice with France between France and Nazi Germany. Following this, the carriage itself was taken to Berlin as a trophy of war, along with pieces of a large stone tablet which bore the inscription (in French):

Here on the Eleventh of November 1918 Succumbed the Criminal Pride of the German Reich. Vanquished by the Free Peoples Which it Tried to Enslave..

Following this period of display in Berlin, CIWL #2419 was moved to Ohrdruf in Thuringia for storage in 1945. Following the Allied advance into Germany in early 1945, the detachment of SS troops protecting the carriage set it ablaze before burying the remains to prevent them from falling into Allied hands. Some remnants were later exhumed and moved back to the restored Compiègne site for display, while CIWL later donated another carriage from the same construction order, 1913-built CIWL #2439, in 1950 as a replacement. This carriage had also been at Compiègne on 11 November 1918, and it was renumbered as #2419D for display at Compiègne where it was installed on Armistice Day 1950.

== In popular culture ==
Agatha Christie set two of her Hercule Poirot mysteries on or around CIWL trains:

- Murder on the Orient Express, set on the Orient Express.
- The Mystery of the Blue Train, set on the Calais-Mediterranée Express.
- She also mentioned the Orient Express in one of her Parker Pyne short stories: “Have you got everything you want?”.

Sidney Gilliat and Clifford Grey wrote the script for the 1932 British film directed by Walter Forde:

- Rome Express, set on the Rome Express.

In 1991, David Copperfield performed a televised illusion which caused a recently restored "Orient Express dining car" (in fact an American dining car decorated in Wagon-Lits colours) to seemingly vanish into thin air.

CIWL model railway cars have been manufactured by many companies including Märklin, Fleischmann, Trix, Lima (models), Jouef, Bachmann, France Trains, LS Models and Tri-ang. Rivarossi also produced very detailed models, discontinued in the late nineties, production restarted lately with the new society affiliated to Hornby.

== Name history ==
CIWL has changed its name several names:

- Compagnie Internationale des Wagons-Lits (1872–1893)
- Compagnie Internationale des Wagons-Lits et des Grands Express Européens (1893–1967)
- Compagnie Internationale des Wagons-Lits et du Tourisme (1967–2010)
- Newrest Wagons-Lits (2010–present)

The company has also colloquially been shortened to CIWL, Compagnie des Wagons-Lits, and Wagons-Lits.

=== In different languages ===
- Czech: Mezinárodní společnost lůžkových vozů (a velkých evropských expresních vlaků)
- German: Internationale (Eisenbahn-)Schlafwagen-Gesellschaft
- Danish: Det Internationale Sovevogns- (og de Store Europæiske Eksprestogs-)Selskab
- English: International Sleeping-Car (and Great European Expresses) Company
- Finnish: Kansainvälinen Makuuvaunu- (ja Euroopan Pikajuna)yhtiö
- French: Compagnie Internationale des Wagons-Lits (et des Grands Express Européens)
- Greek: Διεθνής Εταιρεία Κλιναμαξών (και Ταχειών Ευρωπαϊκών Αμαξοστοιχιών)
- Hungarian: Nemzetközi Vasúti Hálókocsi Társaság
- Italian: Compagnia Internazionale dei Vagoni-Letto (e dei Grandi Treni Espressi Europei)
- Lithuanian: Tarptautinė miegamųjų vagonų bendrovė
- Dutch: Internationale Maatschappij voor Slaapwagens en Europa's Groote Sneltreinen
- Polish: Międzynarodowe Towarzystwo Wagonów Sypialnych (i Ekspresów Europejskich)
- Portuguese: Companhia Internacional das Carruagens-Camas (e dos Grandes Expressos Europeus)
- Romanian: Compania internaţională a vagoanelor de dormit (şi a marilor exprese europene)
- Russian: Международное Общество Спальныхъ Вагоновъ (и Скорыхъ Европейскихъ поѣздовъ)
- Serbian: Međunarodno Društvo Kola za Spavanje / Међународно Друштво Кола за Спавање
- Spanish: Compañía Internacional de Coches-Camas (y de los Grandes Expresos Europeos)
- Turkish: Avrupa Hızlı Trenleri ve Uluslararası Yataklı Vagonlar Şirketi
- Bulgarian: Компания на международните спални вагони и големите европейски експреси
