= Kaleva =

Kaleva or Kalevi may refer to:

- CWT Kaleva Travel, a travel management company based in Finland
- Kalevi (mythology), a character in Finnish, Karelian and Estonian mythology
- Kaleva (wasp), a wasp genus in the subfamily Pteromalinae
- Kaleva (Tampere), a portion of the city of Tampere, Finland
  - Kaleva Church
- Kaleva (airplane), registered as OH-ALL, civilian airliner shot down by Soviet bombers in 1940
- Kaleva (newspaper), a newspaper founded in 1899 in Oulu in northern Finland
- Kaleva, Michigan, a village in the United States, founded by Finnish settlers
- Kaleva Mutual Insurance Company, Finnish insurance company. Part of Sampo Group.
