= Navan, Inc. =

US travel management company

- Navan logo
- Type: Public
- Traded as: Nasdaq: NAVN (Class A); Russell 2000 component
- Industry: Corporate travel management
- Founded: March 2015; 11 years ago
- Founders: Ariel Cohen; Ilan Twig
- Headquarters: Palo Alto, California, U.S.
- Area served: Worldwide
- Key people: Ariel Cohen (CEO); Ilan Twig (CTO); Michael Sindicich (President); Aurélien Nolf (CFO)
- Products: Navan Travel Management; Navan Expense; Navan Payments; Navan Events; Navan Edge
- Revenue: ▲US$702 million (2026)
- Net income: ▼ −US$398 million (2026)
- Number of employees: 3,000
- Website: navan.com

Navan, Inc. (formerly TripActions) is an American corporate travel and expense management company headquartered in Palo Alto, California. Founded in May 2015 by Ariel Cohen and Ilan Twig, Navan offers an integrated platform combining travel booking, corporate-issued payment cards, expense reporting, and analytics for businesses worldwide.

== History ==
The Palo Alto, California–based travel company, TripActions Inc., was founded in May 2015 by Ariel Cohen and Ilan Twig (also the founders of StreamOnce, acquired by Jive Software).

In January 2016, TripActions received $14.6 million series A round led by Oren Zeev Ventures and Lightspeed Venture Partners with participation from Group 11. The company officially launched out of stealth mode and announced their funding in January 2017. In October 2017, the company announced that they had raised an additional $12.5 million led by Lightspeed Venture Partners with participation from Zeev Ventures and Group 11.

The company moved in June 2017 from Menlo Park, California, to its headquarters in Palo Alto.

In March 2018, the company announced a $51 million Series B round led by the same two investors with participation from prior investors.

In July 2018, TripActions announced its international expansion to Europe with an office in London and their European headquarters in Amsterdam. They shared potential plans to expand to the Asia-Pacific region to scale their customer support infrastructure.

In November 2018, the company announced a valuation north of $1 billion and a $154 million Series C funding round led by new investor Andreessen Horowitz, with participation from repeat investors Lightspeed Venture Partners, Zeev Ventures, and Group 11. Ben Horowitz joined the Board of Directors.

In February 2019, the company announced its new flight storefront in alignment with major airline partners and industry association ATPCO. The storefront includes branding and imagery of cabin classes and amenities for each airline. It works for domestic and international flights, including international-to-international itineraries, and for flights on joint venture partners of American, Delta and United.

In June 2019, TripActions raised a $250 million Series D funding round from Andreessen Horowitz, Zeev Ventures, Lightspeed Venture Partners and Group 11. The total valuation of the company reached $4 billion.

In November 2019, the company announced that it had enabled an NDC-enabled direct connection to the Lufthansa Group.

In February 2020, the company launched TripActions Liquid, a payment, expense and reconciliation technology integrated into its core platform. Alongside that announcement, the company announced the security of $500 million on credit to fuel the platform.

In June 2020, it raised $125 million in a financing led by Greenoaks, which allowed the company to continue investing in growth and product despite the significant impact of the COVID-19 pandemic.

In October 2020, it expanded the TripActions Liquid product by adding broader expense capabilities.

In January 2021, TripActions raised a $155 million Series E round of funding.

In October 2021, TripActions raised a $275 million Series F round of funding with a valuation near $7.25 billion. It reported having 1500 employees.

In February 2022, TripActions acquired Comtravo, a German corporate travel company with 2,500 clients and 250 employees.

In October 2022, the company raised a $300 million Series G round of funding with a valuation of $9.2 billion.

In February 2023, TripActions rebranded to Navan, bringing together its offerings into a travel and expense services app. The palindrome name Navan has roots in the words "navigate" and "avant" to mean "navigating forward".

In April 2023, Navan announced its agreement to acquire Tripeur, a Bangalore-based modern travel and expense management company, expanding Navan Group’s presence in India. The acquisition marked the fifth purchase in two years.

In December 2023, Navan laid off 5% of its workforce.

As rumors mounted in June 2024 that Navan was pursuing an IPO, they appointed former NYSE exec, Amy Butte, as their CFO.

On 21 October 2025, Navan formally announced their IPO offering nearly 37 million shares. The company went public on 30 October 2025 on the Nasdaq under the ticker NAVN. It reported revenues growing 30% year over year but remained unprofitable.

On September 9, 2026, Navan acquires AI-powered Events platform BoomPop.

== Partnerships ==
Users can access mobile apps for Uber and Lyft in their mobile travel itineraries while traveling.

== See also ==
- Perk (company)
- SAP Concur
- Serko
- Junction (company)
