= CWT Kaleva Travel =

Travel management company in Finland

Kaleva Travel Ltd
- Company type: Subsidiary
- Industry: Travel
- Founded: 1935; 91 years ago
- Headquarters: Helsinki, Finland
- Services: Travel agency Travel management company
- Number of employees: 450 (2011)
- Parent: CWT
- Website: kalevatravel.fi

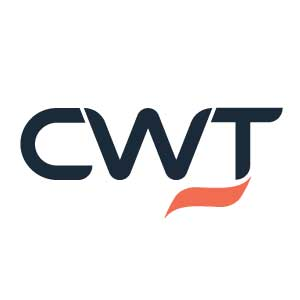
CWT's company logo

CWT Kaleva Travel is the largest travel management company in Finland. It is a division of CWT, owned by Carlson, which acquired the company in February 2011.

The company also operates in Estonia, Latvia, Lithuania, and Romania. Client companies were offered the possibility of self-booking, and the first product was Amadeus Finland Oyn Aergo, with which the travel booker or passenger could book flight tickets himself. Travel service points or satellite office that were on the premises of customer companies began to be transferred to service centers that were quickly becoming common. The innovation of the leisure travel agency service was personal, home-visiting.

The origins of the company date to 1935.
