= Serko =

Travel management company

Coordinates: 36.850126°S 174.781436°E

Serko Limited
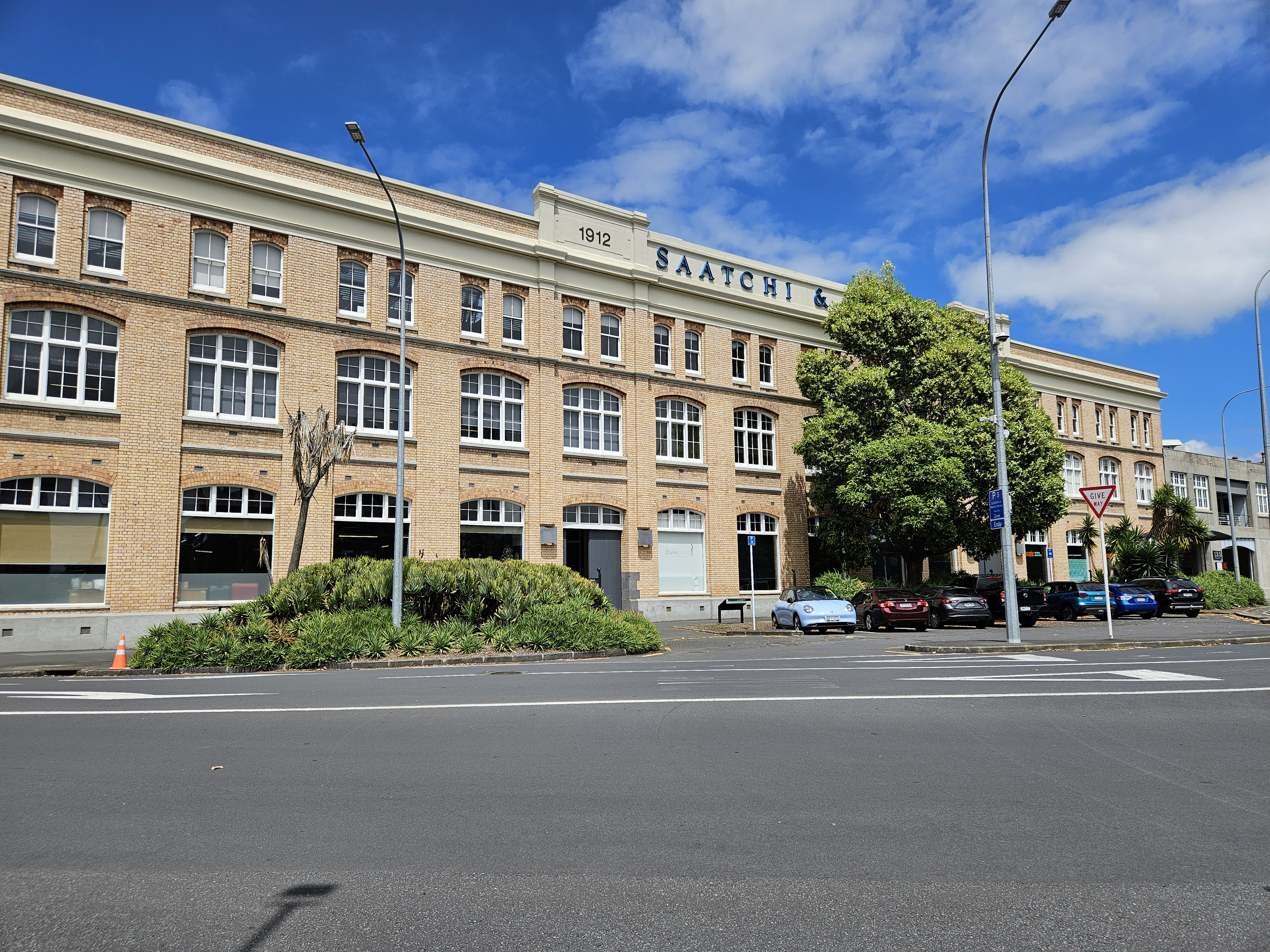
- Saatchi & Saatchi Building in Parnell
- Type: Public company
- Traded as: NZX: SKO ASX: SKO
- Founded: 23 May 2007; 19 years ago
- Headquarters: Saatchi Building, Parnell, Auckland, New Zealand
- Key people: Darrin Grafton (CEO); Bob Shaw (CSO); Shane Sampson (CFO); Matthew Gerrie(COO)
- Revenue: $48m FY23 $63m-$70m FY24 NZD
- Number of employees: 380
- Website: serko.com

Serko Limited, known as Serko, is a travel management and expense technology company headquartered in New Zealand.

Serko was publicly listed on the New Zealand Stock Exchange in June 2014 and on the Australian Stock Exchange in 2018 under the ticker code SKO. In October 2019, Booking Holdings purchased 4.7% as part of a partnership deal. In 2020 Serko won the New Zealand High-Tech Awards, winning company of the year.

== History ==
Serko was founded in 2007 by Darrin Grafton and Robert Shaw, based on a previous business idea. In 2012 Serko received a $2.3 million NZD grant from Callaghan Innovation, the R&D investment arm of the New Zealand Government, and commenced an international expansion, opening a development office in Xi'an, China. Serko was subsequently listed on the New Zealand Stock Market in 2014. With the new capital raising, Serko purchased Incharge, an expense provider in 2014, and Arnold Travel Technology in 2015 from Expedia Group. In 2018 Serko launched into the North America market and purchased InterplX in 2019. In 2019, Booking Holdings purchased 4.7% of Serko through a capital raising of $17.5 million NZD, as part of its Booking for Business expansion plans

In 2024, Serko announced that it had agreed to buy corporate travel booking platform, GetThere, from Sabre for US$12M. On 6 January 2025, Serko announced that they had completed the transaction with Sabre with CEO, Darrin Grafton, adding “we are investing US$100 million over the next three years to advance our platform technology to build the travel platform of the future. In time, this platform will power all of Serko’s products, including GetThere, Zeno and Booking.com for Business with data and AI built in to help you take advantage of emerging technology capabilities.”

In November 2025, Serko announced a "workforce reshaping" aimed at cutting up to 60 roles, primarily aiming for $12 million in annualised savings, as reported by the National Business Review. Despite the cuts, the company continues to hire in other areas and recently added 70 staff in India.

In March 2026, Serko announced a new product, serko.ai for release in May 2026.

== COVID-19 challenges ==
Serko was one of the first NZX-listed companies to issue a COVID-19 pandemic related profit warning in February 2020, well before other key market players and other travel technology companies, causing a 13% drop in their share price immediately following the warning. In the following months Serko announced its worst annual performance in company history with a net loss of $29.4m and revenue halving to $12.4m. Due to the uncertainty, the company conducted a capital raising of $55 million on the market which was oversubscribed. Following a government response to COVID-19 which created normal domestic conditions in New Zealand and the establishment of the Trans-Tasman bubble, Serko returned to pre-covid transaction levels in March 2021, and issued guidance to the market in May 2021 that it expects to make complete recovery by March 2023.

== Partnerships ==
Serko's main partnerships are with the Flight Centre Travel Group (FCTG) and Booking Holdings. Serko provides FCTG with a unique corporate online booking tool marketed as SAVI as part of the arrangement. In terms of Booking.com, a revenue sharing agreement is in place whereby Serko provides the underlying technology for Booking for Business, and Booking Holdings owns 4.7% of Serko and provides travel technology expertise.

Today, Booking.com for business has over 1 million companies registered across 180 countries and is supported in multiple languages. 2025 announcements for Serko's half year indicated growth of 40k new active customers. Serko works with some of the biggest brands in the world (by customer numbers). On average they can onboard around 1k new companies every business day.

Serko produces white label storefront technology that powers the travel industry, it also produced the world's first marketplace that allows the supplier to connect their content into the storefront with or without the need for legacy GBD (Global distribution System) PNR's. Serko owns multiple key market patents.

The founders of Serko have been referenced as the inventors of online corporate travel in May 1994 with their first product called CABS (Corporate Automated Booking System) the platform was used by Amadeus in the 1990's to prove prior art claims against previously filed patents.

Serko's other main partnership is with Carlson Wagonlit Travel, enabling Serko to expand into the North American marketplace and enabling Carlson Wagonlit Travel to retain market share win the Australia and New Zealand markets.

The company was also the first travel technology company to partner with Southwest Airlines and Qantas to provide their airfares on the newly developed NDC Exchange.

== See also ==
- SAP Concur
- TripActions
