= Gilbert Haroche =

American entrepreneur and businessman (1927–2015)

- Born: June 21, 1927; New York City, New York, U.S.
- Died: April 23, 2015 (aged 87); New York City
- Education: New York University
- Occupations: Entrepreneur; businessman
- Spouse: Charlene Haroche
- Children: 5

Gilbert Haroche (1927–2015) was an entrepreneur and businessman. He was the co-founder of Liberty Travel and Gogo Vacations, which he started in 1951. He is considered the father of the affordable package vacation and who built an “economy travel empire".

== Early life ==
Haroche was born in Manhattan on June 21, 1927. He graduated from Stuyvesant High School, served in the US Navy on a destroyer escort until 1946 and later graduated from NYU's Engineering school in 1950.

== Business career ==
In 1951, he co-founded Liberty Travel and after selling trips to the Catskills, NY he added Mexico, Bahamas and other destinations.

Haroche is often credited as bringing travel to the middle class Americans with affordable package vacations. The company was later sold to Flight Centre in 2008.

He is a member of the Tourism Cares hall of fame.

== Real estate ==
Gilbert Haroche received notoriety as "the worlds richest travel agent" by many real estate magazines when several properties were listed or sold by Haroche. One property in New York held the record as the highest Co-Op listing but closed for less and was the second highest property sold that year.

== Death ==
Haroche died of cancer on April 23, 2015, at age 87 at Columbia University Medical Center in New York City. He is survived by his widow Charlene Haroche, her children Marcella Leone, Andre Haroche, and Maurice Haroche, his children Kim Haroche and Bob Haroche from his first marriage, and ten grandchildren.
