= Perk (company) =

Spanish travel management company

- Formerly: TravelPerk (2015–2025)
- Type: Private
- Industry: Corporate Travel Management
- Founded: 2015
- Founder: Avi Meir (CEO); Javier Suarez; Ron Levin
- Headquarters: Boston and London
- Area served: Worldwide
- Key people: JC Taunay-Bucalo (President & COO); Roy Hefer (CFO); Yasmine Bratt (CRO); Nikita Miller (CPO); Robin Smith (CTO); Flick Williams (VP People)
- Number of employees: 1800+ (2025)
- Website: www.perk.com

Perk (formerly TravelPerk) is a travel and spend management company that provides companies with a variety of travel- and expense-management services via their software platform. The company has dual headquarters in Boston and London, with business hubs in Barcelona, London, Birmingham, Edinburgh, Berlin, Chicago, Miami, Munich and Zurich. The company raised $409 million at the end of its Series D funding round in 2022, achieving unicorn status and a valuation of over $1 billion. In 2025, an additional series E fundraise of $200M gave a $2.7B valuation.

== History ==
TravelPerk was founded in 2015 by Avi Meir (founder of Hotel Ninjas, acquired by Booking.com), Javier Suarez, and Ron Levin. Their aim was to create an all-in-one platform that's aimed at making business travel management easier and keeping travelers happy. Travel services are consumed from Global Distribution Systems (GDS), direct connects to the providers and other Computer Reservation Systems (CRS). An intuitive frontend is giving best usability to travelers.

Shortly after being founded, TravelPerk received a $7 million series A round led by Spark Capital. In October 2018, the company raised a $21 million Series B round led by Target Global, Felix Capital, Spark Capital, Sunstone, and Amplo. In July 2019, the company finalized a two-part, $104 million series C funding backed by Kinnevik, Partners of DST Global, Target Global, Felix Capital, Sunstone, and LocalGlobe.

In 2020, due to constant changes in travel regulations and health/safety guidelines as a result of the pandemic, TravelPerk acquired Albatross API, a software company that developed TravelSafe API, providing real-time health and safety information to travelers. In the same year, the company also launched an online marketplace, where its customers can integrate partner products and services into their own platforms and workflows.

In 2021, TravelPerk acquired NexTravel (Silicon Valley), one of the biggest business travel platforms in the US, ClickTravel (Birmingham), the leader in domestic business travel in the UK, and Susterra (London), a corporate responsibility consultancy to propel TravelPerk's sustainable travel to the next level. In the same year, the company raised $160 million in series D funding, and in 2022, it raised an additional $115 million series D second round, unlocking unicorn status with a valuation of over $1 billion.

In 2024, TravelPerk announced they had agreed to acquire a US-based competitor, AmTrav, and raised $135 million in debt financing from firms Blackstone and Blue Owl.

Less than six months later, in early 2025, TravelPerk announced the acquisition of Swiss expense software company, Yokoy, and an additional series E fundraise of $200M at a $2.7B valuation. This acquisition laid the technological foundation for a transformation from a travel booking provider to an end to end platform, combining travel, spend and payment in one product. The deal was finalised in April 2025. The acquisition of Yokoy was not merely an add-on, but marked the birth of Perk as a serious competitor to heavyweights such as SAP Concur and Navan, blurring the line between travel booking and financial management.

In March 2025, TravelPerk announced a corporate rebrand to mark its 10th anniversary. The rebranding introduced a new logo and visual identity.

In November 2025, the company announced its rebrand from TravelPerk to Perk, introducing a new AI-native platform that combines travel and spend management in a single experience. As part of the rebrand, Perk established dual headquarters in Boston and London to support global growth and continues to operate with over 1,800 employees in 12 offices worldwide.

In December 2025, the company announced that Perk had become a sponsor of the Audi F1 Team. The partnership marks Perk's entry into global motorsport sponsorship, aligning the brand with one of Formula 1's upcoming works teams.

In June 2026, the company secured a €258 million credit facility.

== Partnerships & Marketplace ==
Perk partners with a wide range of businesses that span a variety of industries. Inbound and outbound APIs allow dynamic connections to related source or target systems in the business travel management process.

- HR apps for employee master data, e.g. BambooHR, Deel, Personio, HiBob
- Duty of Care services, e.g. International SOS, Crisis 24, Riskline
- Expense apps, e.g. Spendesk, Ramp, Pleo, Rydoo, Emburse, MobileXpense, Bill (formerly Divvy)
- ERP systems, Finance systems, e.g. DATEV, BMD, SAP, Microsoft Dynamics, Sage
- Event management
- Health and wellness
- Sustainability

== See also ==
- Egencia
- SAP Concur
- Serko
- Snowfall
