= Flight Centre =

Multinational retail travel agency

Flight Centre Travel Group
- Type: Public company
- Traded as: ASX: FLT
- Industry: Travel
- Founded: 1982
- Headquarters: Brisbane, Queensland, Australia
- Key people: Graham Turner and Charlotte Blake
- Services: Travel agency
- Number of employees: 6,000 (July 2020)
- Subsidiaries: 99 Bikes; Discova; StudentUniverse; FCM Travel Solutions; Liberty Travel; Aunt Betty; Flight Centre Exclusives; Iglu.com; Topdeck Travel; Scott Dunn; Travel Associates; GOGO Vacations; Corporate Traveler; Back-Roads Touring; GapYear.com; Cruiseabout
- Website: www.fctgl.com (corporate)

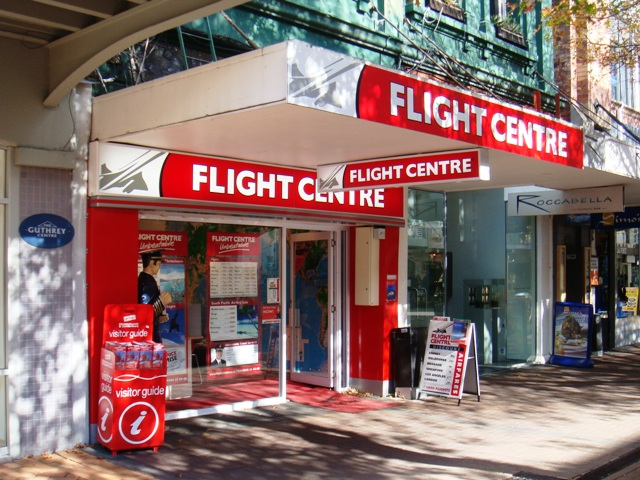
Flight Centre store in Christchurch, New Zealand

Flight Centre Travel Group (FCTG) is an Australian travel agency. It was founded in 1982, and is headquartered in Brisbane, Queensland, Australia.

FCTG operates under multiple names in Australia, New Zealand, United States, Canada, United Kingdom, South Africa, India, China mainland, Hong Kong (China), Singapore, United Arab Emirates, and Mexico, and licenses its name in a further 80 countries. In the United States, the company operates under the Liberty Travel and Travel Associates retail brands and GOGO Worldwide Vacations as a wholesale brand. It also operates StudentUniverse, FCM Travel Solutions, Corporate Traveler, ciEvents, Campus Travel, Stage & Screen, and Healthwise.

== History ==
The company was co-founded by Graham Turner and Geoff Harris in 1982 and began with a store in Sydney. Flight Centre South Africa opened its first retail store in Eastgate, Bedfordview, Johannesburg on 17 Dec 1994. In 1995, Flight Centre UK and Flight Centre Canada opened.

In December 2015, the company acquired StudentUniverse, the world's largest student and youth travel agency, and a 70% stake in BYOjet. Additionally, in 2016, the company began online travel brand Aunt Betty. Together, BYOJet and Aunt Betty operate as "low cost" Australian online travel agents, providing flights and other services at lower prices than Flight Centre's retail locations.

In New Zealand, Flight Centre operates a number of brands including Cruiseabout, Student Flights, Travel Associates, FCM Travel Solutions, Corporate Traveller, Travel Money NZ, Travel Managers Group and Executive Travel Group.

Flight Centre was severely impacted by the COVID-19 pandemic, which saw an 80% decline in the company's share price (or about 85% from the August 2018 peak), cancellation of a previously announced dividend, and a suspension in trading of shares from 23 March 2020 to 7 April 2020. In early 2020, Flight Centre announced that 6,000 staff would be made redundant or placed on unpaid leave globally, due to the effects of international travel restrictions in the pandemic. This included 3,800 staff in Australia. The New Zealand branch of the company made 250 employees redundant and temporarily closed 33 branches, out of a total of 1200 employees and 140 outlets around New Zealand. In June 2020, Flight Centre announced the redundancy of a further 1500 staff. In October 2020, the company announced the closure of a further 91 stores, with several hundred further redundancies.

In response to the COVID-19 pandemic, Flight Centre carried out an emergency rescue equity raising in April 2020 of $700 million at a price of $7.20 per share, or approximately 90% less than its August 2018 peak. In June 2020 it sought a further debt facility from the Bank of England under emergency COVID-19 schemes.

In January 2023, Flight Centre purchased Scott Dunn.

In November 2025, Flight Centre Travel Group launched World360 Rewards, their new loyalty program, in Australia.

In December 2025, it was announced that Flight Centre would acquire Iglu, a UK-based cruise booking platform, in a transaction valued at about £100 million. The deal incorporated Iglu’s online cruise operations into the group and was expected to support its expansion plans in the cruise sector.

== Controversy ==
In 2016, Flight Centre UK was featured on Channel 4's Dispatches in an episode called 'The Truth About Cheap Flights'. Dispatches found alleged examples of undisclosed flight mark-ups, discriminatory pricing against elderly customers, not offering refunds for refundable flights, and seat-blocking.

In 2017, Flight Centre was criticised for advertising that it would price match competitors and then insisting on charging a $49 fee when customers attempted to claim a price match.

In 2018, Flight Centre was criticised for price gouging after former staff reported that the company trained employees to deliberately overcharge customers to generate profit for the company. It was also reported that the base salary of travel consultants was below minimum wage, and staff relied on generating profit through practices such as these in order to earn commissions. The company was the subject of an investigation by The 7.30 Report. In response to the investigation, more than 200 staff contacted the ABC to report widespread bullying, harassment, drug use and a cult-like atmosphere at Flight Centre.

Also in 2018, Stuff.co.nz published copies of posters in Flight Centre offices which reminded female staff selected for the annual "global" staff party to pack condoms and painkillers.

During the COVID-19 pandemic, Flight Centre was criticised for withholding substantial amounts from refunds to customer when suppliers failed to provide travel services, claiming "cancellation fees". Flight Centre later changed course to avoid court action following warnings from the Australian Competition & Consumer Commission and consumers that the practice was illegal. Despite this, customers waited months to receive refunds. The company faced further controversy when it was reported that customers who booked directly, rather than through Flight Centre, received refunds more quickly and without deductions, and that one in three customers still had not received refunds six months later.

In December 2020, Flight Centre faced court for allegedly underpaying staff.

== See also ==
- Hellpworld Travel
- STA Travel
