= Hal Rosenbluth =

American businessman

- Education: University of Miami (1974)
- Occupation: Businessman
- Years active: 1974–present
- Title: Chairman and CEO, New Ocean Health Solutions

Hal Rosenbluth is an American businessman and author. He served as president of the travel management company Rosenbluth International. In 2003, Rosenbluth led the sale of Rosenbluth International to American Express.

Rosenbluth later founded Take Care Health Systems, an in-store clinic operator, which he later sold to Walgreens. Following the sale, he led Walgreens’ Health and Wellness Division.

He is the current Chairman & CEO of New Ocean Health, a technology company focused on addressing needs within healthcare.

Rosenbluth has authored four books: The Customer Comes Second, Good Company, Care to Compete, and Hypochondria: What's Behind the Hidden Costs of Healthcare in America.

== Education ==
Hal Rosenbluth attended college at the University of Miami where he graduated in 1974 with a Bachelor of Arts in General Studies. He served on the University of Miami's Board of Trustees from 2010 to 2012.

== Career ==
=== Rosenbluth International ===
Rosenbluth International was started in Philadelphia in 1892 when Hal Rosenbluth's great-grandfather started assisting European immigrants by charging boat passage to New York and transportation from Ellis Island to Philadelphia. Upon graduation from the University of Miami in 1974, Rosenbluth joined his family's travel agency, Rosenbluth International. Rosenbluth started as an agent issuing Amtrak tickets.

Rosenbluth set up computer operations in 1978 where they could book everything digitally. The business primarily handled corporate global travel need.

Rosenbluth was named president in 1985. In 2003, Rosenbluth led the sale of Rosenbluth International to American Express for a reported $350 million.

=== Linton, North Dakota involvement ===
In 1988, Rosenbluth discovered that the 1,200 person, small farming community of Linton, North Dakota, was struggling through one of the worst droughts the Midwest had seen at the time. Linton set up an office in the town and employed a substantial workforce. Over the years, Rosenbluth International expanded in North Dakota, and in April 2000, was one of the state's largest private employers.

=== Take Care Health Systems ===
In 2004, Rosenbluth co-founded a Take Care Health Systems with Peter Miller. Take Care Health Systems is a chain of “quick-care, no-appointment-needed” clinics that opened their first retail outlet in 2005. They later received funding from Beecken Petty O’Keefe & Company.

In 2007, Rosenbluth sold Take Care Health Systems to Walgreens as a wholly owned subsidiary for an undisclosed amount; at the time of the sale there were 51 locations. In 2013, Walgreens rebranded its Take Care Clinics as Healthcare Clinics. Rosenbluth later created Take Care Health Employer Solutions, which offered a full range a health services to employers to deal with rising healthcare costs. In 2014, Take Care Employer Solutions rebranded to Premise Health.

=== Walgreens ===
Following Walgreens’ acquisition of Take Care Health, Rosenbluth was named President of Health and Wellness at Walgreens. In 2010, Rosenbluth also became head of Walgreens Health Initiatives, a pharmacy benefit management company, which was later sold to Catalyst Healthcare Solutions.

Rosenbluth retired from Walgreens in April 2011.

=== New Ocean Health ===
Rosenbluth founded New Ocean Health in 2013. The company develops health-related software products, with a focus on chronic disease management and wellness programs.

== Author ==
Rosenbluth co-authored with Diane McFerrin Peters his first book, The Customer Comes Second, released in 1992 (revised 2002) in which he talks about the importance of making employees the first priority and customers second, and then success will follow.

In 1998, he released his second book also co-authored with McFerrin Peters, Good Company. In 1999, Rosenbluth released his third book co-authored with McFerrin Peters, Care to Compete. He released his fourth book, Hypochondria: What’s Behind the Hidden Costs of Healthcare in America, June 18, 2024, co-authored with Marnie Hall.

== Books ==
- Rosenbluth, Hal F., and Diane McFerrin Peters. The Customer Comes Second: Put Your People First and Watch ’em Kick Butt. HarperBusiness, 2002. ISBN 978-0-06-052656-6
- Rosenbluth, Hal F., and Diane McFerrin Peters. Good Company: Caring as Fiercely as You Compete. Addison-Wesley, 1998. ISBN 978-0-201-33982-6
- Rosenbluth, Hal F., and Diane MacFerrin Peters. Care to Compete? Secrets from America’s Best Companies on Managing with People and Profits in Mind. Perseus Books, 1998. ISBN 978-0-7382-0135-1
- Rosenbluth, Hal, and Marnie Hall. Hypochondria: What’s behind the Hidden Costs of Healthcare in America. Rodin Books, 2024. ISBN 978-1-957588-28-5
