= Scott Dunn =

Scott Dunn may refer to:

- Scott Dunn (baseball) (born 1978), Major League Baseball pitcher
- Scott Dunn (tour operator), a luxury tour operator

== Other uses ==
- Scott Dunn Polar Challenge
