= Junction (company) =

Travel technology company

- Trade name: Junction
- Type: Private
- Industry: Corporate Travel Management
- Founded: 2003
- Founders: Stefan Cars
- Headquarters: London, United Kingdom
- Area served: Worldwide
- Key people: Stefan Cars (CEO); Hervé Gilg (Deputy CEO); Christoffer Möller (COO); Matthew Turner (Chairman); Simon Karlsfeldt (Chief Growth Officer)
- Products: Junction One; Junction Pay; Junction Plus
- Number of employees: 200 (2023)
- Subsidiaries: Snowfall Operations AB; Snowfall Connectivity; Snowfall MEA; Snowfall AB; Global Transport Solutions Ltd; Snowfall Amigos
- Website: junctionconnect.com/

Junction (formerly known as Snowfall Limited) is an online travel management, content and payments company.

== History ==
Snowfall began with passenger service system software and mobile applications for rail and ferry providers in Sweden.

By 2014, the company was listed by Swedish newspaper Dagens industri as one of Sweden's 900 fastest growing companies.

=== MTR partnership, lawsuits, and liquidation ===
Snowfall began working with MTR as their IT provider for the MTR Express in Sweden in 2015. The partnership appeared deep, even as staff moved between the companies. Snowfall's founder and CEO, Stefan Cars, even acted as MTR's CTO.

In June 2017 a joint venture between MTR and Guangshen Railway Company was shortlisted to bid for the West Coast Partnership franchise to commence in 2019. In December 2018 it was accounced that Spanish operator Renfe Operadora joined their bid, with Snowfall as a software subcontractor and Trainline providing a distribution outlet. In August 2019, it was announced that the bid was unsuccessful, losing to a joint bid by First and Trenitalia.

In February 2019, MTR abruptly sued Snowfall. Once MTR ceased working with Snowfall as its IT, marketing, sales and booking provider, it had to immediately stop selling tickets as it could not gain access to their own internet domains as those too were controlled by Snowfall. In order to update customers, the rail operator had to do so via their Facebook page. In a message, they told customers to delete the app and visit a new website for tickets.

MTR demanded restitution of 200,000 SEK per day until they were given access back. MTR claims was rejected by the court in Stockholm. By October 2019, Swedish tech site BreakIt, reported that Snowfall was in an economic crisis with millions in debt, unpaid taxes, a lawsuit brought against it by a former manager unpaid wages and pension payments, and 13 lawsuits from vendors who said they had not been paid.

In late 2019, Snowfall entered corporate reconstruction due to its inability to pay debts. The company faced significant challenges, including a payment cessation from a major Japanese client embroiled in a U.S. bribery scandal, and a contentious dispute with MTR Express, which terminated its contract with Snowfall. As Snowfall’s clients continued to leave them, this exacerbated the company’s financial instability. These events culminated in substantial debt, leading to staff reductions and efforts to cut costs through office relocations.

The company logo through 2025

In early 2020, Snowfall’s reconstruction efforts faced further setbacks. Stockholm District Court denied the company’s request to extend the reconstruction period, citing doubts about Snowfall’s ability to settle its debts and concerns over internal financial reporting inconsistencies. The court also noted an ongoing investigation by the Swedish Economic Crime Authority into the company’s activities. In response, Snowfall appealed the decision to the Court of Appeal, with COO Christoffer Möller disputing the allegations and asserting that certain claims against them were unfounded but ultimately lost and was liquidated in Sweden.

=== Junction ===
Cars moved the company from Sweden to the UK. Snowfall announced it created Junction in 2019, calling it a modern cloud-based and open API (Application Programming Interface) ecosystem to reduce the technical barriers and costs of integrating systems and to increase connectivity between a wider range of travel suppliers and sellers When asked in an interview with the UK's Travel Weekly, Cars claimed that Junction will be a multimodal "app store for travel businesses." When asked about the commercial model, Cars claimed that Junction operates a subscription model and helps offset costs by paying for clients to sign up for their service.

Chief Product Officer, Philip Saxholm, described in an interview with TravelNews.se in 2021, Junction as a B2B platform focused on connecting operators, retailers, and partners across multiple travel sectors such as aviation, rail, bus, and ferry services. Saxholm highlighted that Junction was built as a Platform-as-a-Service (PaaS) with a pay-per-use model. He described Junction's key innovation lies in its multi-modal functionality, allowing users to search for and book journeys combining different modes of transportation. When asked in a follow-up how Snowfall would compete with established industry players such as Amadeus, Saxholm responded that Snowfall competes through speed, competence, company culture, and new technology, which provides clear advantages in terms of cost and functionality.

In 2022, the company acquired an award-winning US based booking platform called PSNGR1 after that company ran into funding issues. In a podcast, VP Global Sales, Richard Viner, said that the PSNGR1 platform was rebranded as Junction One and coupled with the rest of Junction, including disruption management and fintech software.

Roughly a year later, the company acquired a group travel app called AmigoGo and brought its founders, Nick Castrioty and Josh Sparkes, into the business. Chief Growth Officer, Simon Arvidsson clarified the company's position with regards to acquisitions stating that they would acquire companies that would already fit into the Junction ecosystem while continuing to pursue organic growth.

=== Recurring Financial Troubles, Staff Fallout and UK Tribunals ===
Despite efforts to maintain strong financial backing and investor confidence, reports surfaced in November 2024 that the company struggled with issues such as skipping payroll, reducing staff, and closing locations. These challenges were attributed by the CEO, Stefan Cars, to “fast-paced growth” outpacing operational capabilities, general mismanagement, and a high turnover at the CFO level.

In an article in The Company Dime, the author's highlighted that critics had pointed out that Snowfall’s business model relies on outdated technology, and its ambitious claims lack focus. The company’s financial filings for 2022 revealed a negative equity of $224,761 and a total workforce of just 32 employees. Despite this, Snowfall reported investments from firms like Korelya Capital and Kingsway Capital, who expressed support for the company’s restructuring efforts.

Faced with significant financial and operational challenges, additional reports surfaced leading to internal disputes and public scrutiny. In a January 2025 interview, CEO Stefan Cars acknowledged management missteps, including overambitious growth and rapid hiring, but denied any financial misconduct, asserting that the company is now “back on track” with substantial investments and restructuring efforts.

Despite denying allegations of financial misconduct and asserting that the company is “back on track” with substantial investments and a new restructuring plan, many employees have voiced dissatisfaction and distrust in the company’s leadership.

A group of 25 current and former employees strongly criticized Cars’ claims of stability, highlighting severe internal issues such as unpaid wages stretching across multiple months and regions, including the US, UK, and Canada. It was reported that at least four former employees pursued legal action against Snowfall in the UK courts. Employees also reported revoked benefits and alleged mismanagement, which they argued undermined the company’s operational stability and eroded staff morale. These employees described an environment where trust in leadership had completely broken down, with many expressing frustration over what they saw as empty reassurances from the CEO.

This fallout was exacerbated by reports of layoffs and office closures, as well as what some employees called “reckless promises” made to investors without a clear plan for sustainable growth. Employees accused the leadership of prioritizing rapid expansion over operational efficiency and failing to address foundational issues, leaving the workforce demoralized and skeptical of the company’s future. The rift between staff and leadership was cited as a significant hurdle, casting doubt on Snowfall’s ability to regain stability and repair its reputation.

=== Rebranding and Continued Financial Controversy ===
In February 2025, Snowfall, rebranded as Junction, marking a complete overhaul of its corporate identity and operations. It announced a new chairman and Deputy CEO, additional investment from Paris based VC, Korelya Capital, with Stefan Cars remaining as CEO. Following the statement, disgruntled staff claiming to be owed money by Snowfall took to LinkedIn to voice their frustration. They highlighted that in addition to being owed money, the company had already proceeded to liquidate their UK and Canada offices, with the US to follow. The rebranding led to speculation that the company is attempting to distance itself from its past financial and operational troubles, including previous legal issues and bankruptcy in Sweden, where the company was originally founded.

== Services ==
All functionality including administrative travel management can be done through the desktop and mobile application, including booking trips, modifying reservations, tracking travel itineraries, chatting with travel support agents.

Snowfall partners with multiple suppliers in the market Inventory on the platform comes from consumer, corporate, and direct integrations including emissions calculations for travelers and corporations.

== Partnerships ==
Snowfall partners with travel management companies who resell their products via license around the world such as the UK's Gray Dawes Group, Traveltrust, Focus Travel Group and the US' Omega World Travel and Travelstore.

In March 2024, Snowfall announced a partnership with Spanish travel agency consortium, Grupo GEA, to provide members with rail content from its Junction platform.

== See also ==
- Navan
- SAP Concur
- Serko
- TravelPerk
