= CWT (company) =

Travel management company

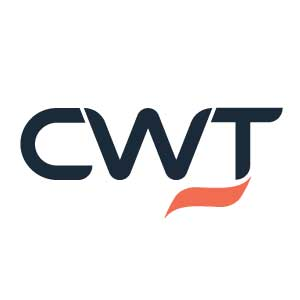
- Formerly: Carlson Wagonlit Travel (1994 - 17th Feb. 2019)
- Type: Privately held company
- Industry: Travel management company
- Founded: 1994; 32 years ago
- Headquarters: Minneapolis, Minnesota, United States
- Area served: 145 countries
- Key people: Patrick Andersen, President & CEO
- Services: Corporate travel management, Event management
- Revenue: US$1.5 billion
- Number of employees: 18,000
- Website: www.mycwt.com

CWT (formerly Carlson Wagonlit Travel) is a travel management company that manages business travel, meetings, incentives, conferencing, exhibitions, and handles event management.

Headquartered in Minneapolis, Minnesota, the firm reported US$23 billion in total transaction volume in 2018. It is ranked 5th on the list of top earning travel companies published by Travel Weekly.

== History ==
CWT has existed in its present form since 1994, the result of a merger of two large travel agencies: the Carlson Travel Network (originally called the Ask Mr. Foster Travel Agency) and the travel agency division of Compagnie Internationale des Wagons-Lits, founded by Georges Nagelmackers in 1872 in Belgium and acquired by Accor in 1991.

On April 27, 2006, Accor announced the sale of its 50% interest in CWT: 5% to Carlson and 45% to One Equity Partners, an affiliate of JP Morgan Chase. On June 22, 2014, Carlson, which owned a 55% stake in CWT, agreed to acquire the 45% interest in CWT held by JPMorgan Chase.

On February 19, 2019, two years after launching RoomIt by CWT, dedicated to hotel distribution, the company rebranded as CWT. On July 31, 2020, the Register reported that CWT was the victim of a ransomware incident a week earlier, in which they paid US$4.5 million.

In 2022, CWT had a capital injection which resulted in Carlson becoming a minority shareholder.

On March 25, 2024, rival American Express Global Business Travel (Amex GBT) announced its intention to buy CWT for $570 million. In January 2025, the US Department of Justice sued to block the acquisition.

On September 2, 2025, Amex GBT announced that it had completed its purchase of CWT.
