= Newrest Group =

Catering and food service company

Newrest Group International
- Industry: In-flight catering and support services
- Founded: France (1996)
- Headquarters: Toulouse, France
- Key people: Olivier Sadran (Chairman)
- Revenue: €3.3 billion (2024-2025)
- Number of employees: 60,000
- Website: Official website

Newrest Group International is a French company that provides catering and support services, especially for the transport industry. It was founded in 2005 by Olivier Sadran, and is based in Toulouse.

== History ==
Newrest was originally founded in 1996 under the name "Catair" by Olivier Sadran. In 2005, it rebranded as Newrest, expanding its operations in airline and rail catering^{,}.

The company works in over 50 countries and has more than 30,000 employees^{,}. Its main services include inflight catering for airlines, catering on trains, and food services in remote locations like mining camps or penitentiaries. Newrest also manages food outlets in airports^{,}^{,}.
