= FCM Travel Solutions =

Travel and holiday companies of Australia

FCM Travel
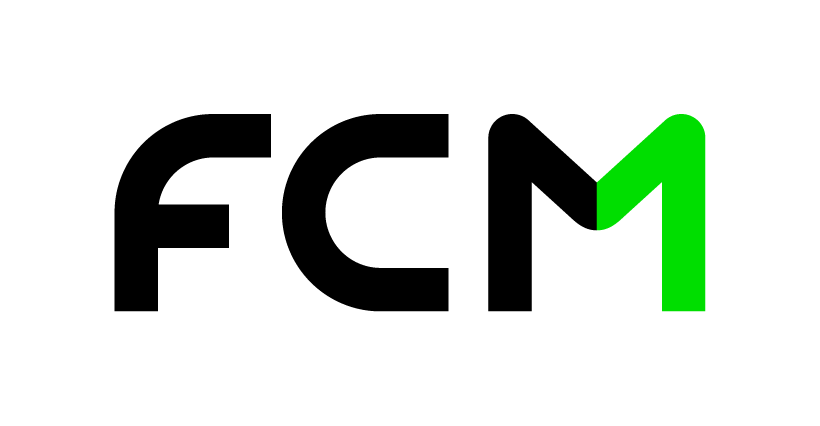
- Type: Public
- Founded: June 2004
- Headquarters: Brisbane, Australia
- Number of locations: Network includes over 100 countries, which is made up of FCTG-owned operations and licensee arrangements.
- Area served: Global
- Key people: Graham Turner (Flight Centre Travel Group founder)
- Services: Corporate travel and expense management
- Number of employees: Over 6,500
- Parent: Flight Centre Travel Group
- Website: www.fcmtravel.com

FCM Travel is the corporate travel business of the Flight Centre Travel Group (FCTG). The company is headquartered in Brisbane and operates a network spanning over 100 countries across Europe, Middle East, Africa, Asia Pacific and the Americas.

== History ==
FCM was officially launched to market in 2004 following the consolidation of various corporate travel businesses within parent company FCTG.

By 2002 FCTG's corporate division included seven different businesses, which in 2004 were consolidated to form FCM Travel Solutions. The reach of FCM's global network broadened with the acquisition of major travel companies including Sydney Business Travel (Australia), Internet Travel Group (Australia), Garber Travel (USA), Bannockburn (USA), Britannic Travel (UK), American International Travel (Hong Kong), Liberty (USA), Friends Globe Travels (India), Travel Tours Group (India), China Comfort (China), Air Services International (Singapore), Worldwide Aviation Services (Malaysia) and Business Travel Development B.V. (BTD) (Netherlands).

Since 2004, FCM has continued to partner with local travel companies around the world to expand the company's network to 90 countries. FCM has 450 offices worldwide, employs more than 6,500 staff and has global turnover of more than US$5 billion.

== Part of the Flight Centre Travel Group ==
FCM is one of five businesses within its parent company FCTG that services the corporate market. Sister corporate travel brands within the group include Corporate Traveller, Campus Travel, Stage and Screen Travel Services and cievents. FCTG is one of the world’s largest travel agency groups, with more than 16,000 staff and 2500 stores across its leisure, corporate and wholesale businesses. The company’s turnover in the 2016/2017 financial year was AUD$20 billion. After starting with one shop over 30 years ago, FCTG has enjoyed remarkable growth and is now in the top 100 publicly listed companies on the Australian Stock Exchange. FCTG operates over 30 retail, corporate and wholesale brands making it Australasia’s largest travel retailer and one of the world’s fastest growing travel groups.
