= Étoile du Nord (train) =

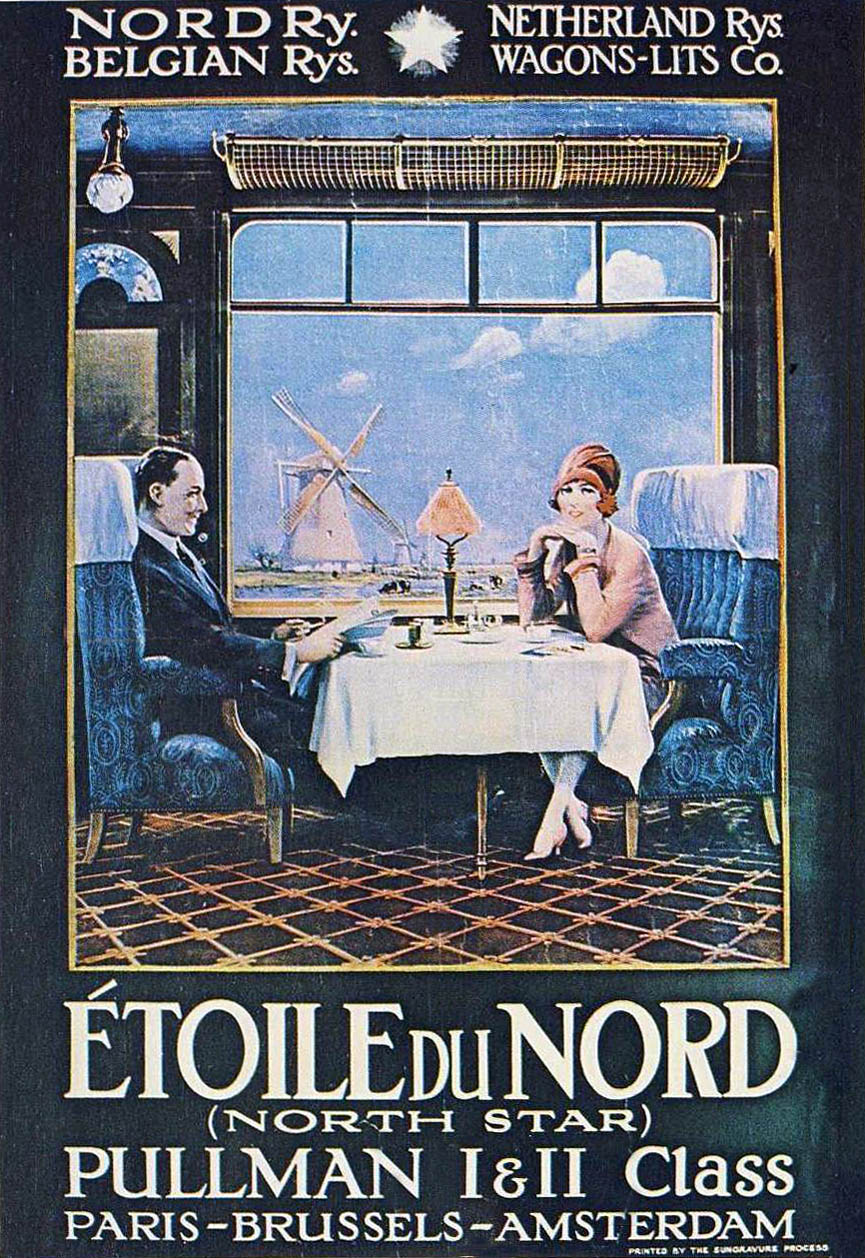
- Advertising poster for the Étoile du Nord, 1927.

Overview
- Service type: Express train (1924–1927); CIWL luxury train (1927–1939); Express train (1946–1957); Trans Europ Express (TEE) (1957–1984); InterCity (IC) (1984–1987); EuroCity (EC) (1987–1996)
- Status: Replaced by Thalys service
- Locale: France; Belgium; Netherlands
- First service: 15 May 1924
- Last service: 1 June 1996
- Former operator(s): Nord / SNCF; NMBS/SNCB; NS; CIWL

Route
- Termini: Paris Nord; Brussels Midi/Zuid / Amsterdam CS
- Service frequency: Daily

Technical
- Track gauge: 1,435 mm (4 ft 8 1/2 in)
Route map
- PBA routes; Étoile du Nord red, Thalys blue

The Étoile du Nord was an international express train. It linked Paris Nord in Paris, France, with Brussels, Belgium, and, for most of its existence, also with Amsterdam CS in Amsterdam, the Netherlands. Its name meant literally "Star of the North" (North Star), and alluded not only to its route heading north from Paris, but also to one of its original operators, the Chemin de Fer du Nord.

== History ==
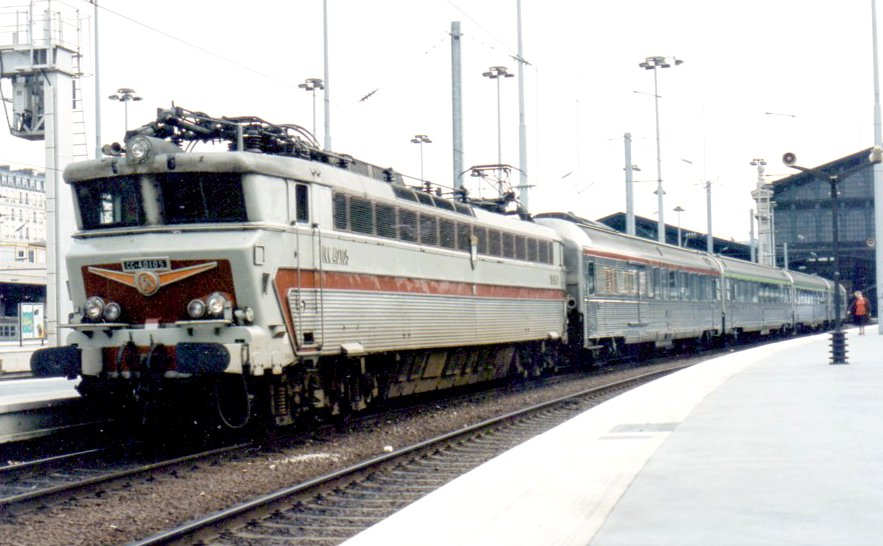
The Étoile du Nord in Paris Nord station

From its introduction in 1924 until 1927, the Étoile du Nord was a Rapide between Paris Nord and Brussels Midi/Zuid, and was operated by the CF du Nord and the National Railway Company of Belgium (NMBS/SNCB). In 1927, it became a luxury train between Paris Nord and Amsterdam CS, via Brussels, and was operated by its original operators, along with the Nederlandse Spoorwegen (NS) and the Compagnie Internationale des Wagons-Lits (CIWL). There was one train per day in each direction.

In 1937, the CF du Nord became part of the SNCF. Two years later, in 1939, the Étoile du Nord was suspended upon the outbreak of World War II. In 1946, the train was revived, initially as a Rapide. In 1957, it became a first-class-only Trans Europ Express (TEE). In June 1984, it was downgraded to a two-class InterCity, but three years later, it was reclassified as one of the inaugural EuroCity trains. On 2 June 1996, it was replaced by an unnamed Thalys service.

== See also ==
- History of rail transport in Belgium
- History of rail transport in France
- History of rail transport in the Netherlands
- List of named passenger trains of Europe
