= Scott Dunn (tour operator) =

Luxury tour operator specialising in ski, family and tailor-made holidays

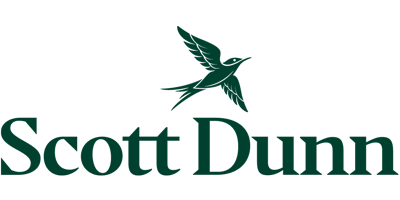
- Company type: Subsidiary
- Industry: Tourism
- Founded: 1 March 1986
- Founder: Andrew Dunn
- Headquarters: London, England
- Key people: Sonia Davies (CEO)
- Parent: Flight Centre
- Website: www.scottdunn.com

Scott Dunn is a luxury tour operator, founded in 1986. It has offices in London, San Diego, New York and Singapore, and sells holidays worldwide.

== History ==
Andrew Dunn founded Scott Dunn in 1986 at age 22 as a luxury ski company operating chalets in the Alps. The company uses an "old family name", Dunn's father and grandfather both being called Scott Dunn. The company grew over the next three decades to offer holidays worldwide.

In 2010 Simon Russell took over as CEO, overseeing the acquisition of Africa, Asia and Latin America specialist Imagine Travel in 2013, the opening of an office in San Diego through the acquisition of Aardvark Safaris in April 2016 and the opening of an office in Singapore in September 2016, enabling the company to operate 24 hours a day. In January 2018 Scott Dunn acquired Country Holidays, a Singapore company with offices in Singapore, Hong Kong, Dubai and China.

In January 2023, Flight Centre purchased Scott Dunn.

== Awards ==
Scott Dunn was voted best Specialist Tour Operator in the Condé Nast Traveller Readers' Travel Awards 2014, 2015, 2016, 2017, 2018, 2019, 2020, 2021, 2022, 2023, 2024 and 2025 and Favourite Tour Operator in the Condé Nast Traveller Readers' Travel Awards 2013, Favourite Specialist Tour Operator in 2011 and Best Family Tour Operator in Junior Magazine's Design Awards in 2013.
