= Cheapair =

American online travel agency

- Type: Private
- Industry: Software, Travel, Internet, Travel agency
- Founded: 1989; 37 years ago
- Headquarters: Agoura Hills, California, United States
- Key people: Jeff Klee (CEO); Craig Fichtelberg (President)
- Products: Software
- Number of employees: 100+
- Website: cheapair.com

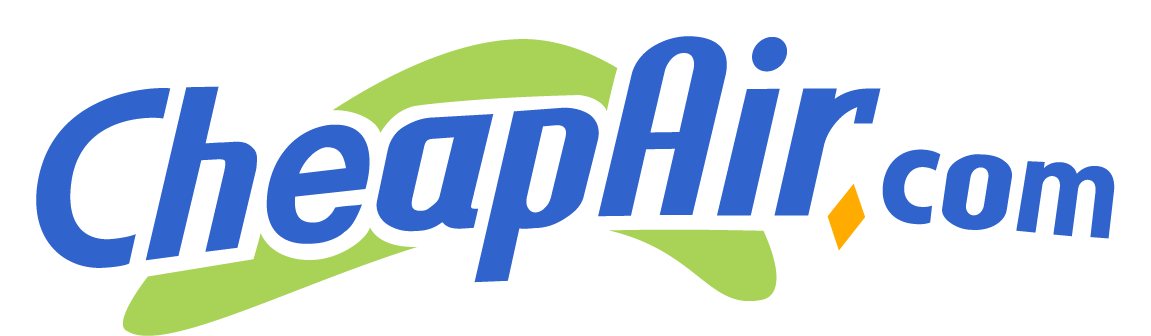
CheapAir.com

CheapAir.com is an American online travel agency, established in 1989 by Jeff Klee. Based in Agoura Hills, California, with an additional office in Chicago, CheapAir is a privately owned company under the parent company AmTrav. According to Travel Weekly, CheapAir.com, under the parent company AmTrav, is ranked #38 on the 2022 Power List of Travel Agencies in the United States.

== History ==
Founded in 1989 by CEO, Jeff Klee, out of his University of Michigan dorm room, CheapAir.com was originally known as 1-800-Cheap-Air prior to the website launch in 2000. In 1993 Craig Fichtelberg became a co-founder and president and began the nationwide expansion from California to Chicago to NYC.

In 2011, CheapAir.com announced Price Drop Payback, a program that guarantees to reimburse any price difference before a flight.

In 2012, after airlines began adding ancillary revenue, CheapAir.com added amenities like WiFi, movies, Live TV, and power ports, to its online shopping display.

In September 2012, CheapAir.com launched “Easy Search”, which lets users enter natural language to search for travel deals, becoming one of the first travel websites to offer semantic search.

In March 2013, CheapAir.com created the first voice-activated flight search app for iOS devices. The app won a Travel Weekly award and was named one of the best apps and websites for travelers.

In November 2013, CheapAir.com became the first travel agency worldwide to accept bitcoin as an alternate form of payment for flights. In February 2014, CheapAir became the first travel agency worldwide to accept bitcoin as an alternate form of payment for hotels. They stopped accepting cryptocurrency for payment in 2024.

In February 2015, CheapAir.com became the first U.S. travel agency to book direct flights from the U.S. to Cuba.

In July 2016, CheapAir.com was the first travel agency to launch a monthly payment option with Affirm allowing travelers to "Travel Now & Pay Later" for flights and hotels worldwide.

In October 2022, CheapAir.com goes green with a new sustainable flight feature called “Green Choice.”

In June 2024, CheapAir.com was acquired by TravelPerk.

== See also ==
- Expedia
- Travelocity
- Cheapflights
