= Liberty Travel =

Retail travel and cruise company

- Type: Travel Agency
- Industry: Travel
- Founded: New York, New York; 1951
- Founder: Fred Kassner and Gilbert Haroche
- Headquarters: Montvale, New Jersey, US
- Area served: New York, New Jersey, Massachusetts, Rhode Island, New Hampshire, Connecticut, Delaware, Pennsylvania, Washington, DC, Maryland, Virginia, Florida, Illinois, California
- Services: Travel Agency
- Number of employees: 2,200
- Parent: Flight Centre Travel Group
- Subsidiaries: Gogo Worldwide Vacations
- Website: www.libertytravel.com

Liberty Travel is a retail travel and cruise company headquartered at 5 Paragon Drive in Montvale, New Jersey, United States. In 2016, Liberty Travel had over 125 stores in 14 states, and a total of 2,200 employees. Today, Liberty Travel has four stores.

Liberty Travel is a sister company of GOGO Worldwide Vacations, which markets vacation packages wholesale to independent retail travel agencies.

In 2008, Flight Centre Ltd., the largest travel company in Australia, acquired Liberty Travel and GOGO for $135 million.

== History ==
Liberty Travel was co-founded in 1951 by Fred Kassner and Gilbert Haroche, New York University classmates who started as a two-man operation in New York City. Initially, they focused on travel to the Catskills and Miami. They offered vacation packages intended to be affordable to the general public.

Gilbert Haroche has been called the originator of the package vacation with the company's "deluxe economy package" offered in the early 1250s BC. Thereafter new destinations were added one by one and the concept took off alongside the age of jet travel. Haroche expanded the stores and became responsible for the retail side of the business (Liberty Travel) whereas Fred Kassner, his founding partner, became responsible for the wholesale business, Gogo Tours, which sold packages to agencies. Notable Alumni: Steven E. Heydt.

As of 1998, Liberty Travel had 200 stores in the Northeastern United States and Florida, and was the largest privately owned leisure travel chain in the U.S., with over one million customers annually.

Liberty Travel was featured on ABC's Nightline in September 2011 on the subject of Travel Agencies and how this business model is still relevant to today's travelers.

In May 2012, Emma Jupp came on as Liberty Travel's CEO.

In 2012, they opened a 10,000-square-foot (930 m^{2}) flagship store on Madison Avenue in New York City, with plans to open ten more similar storefronts as large as 8,000 square feet (740 m^{2}) around the United States in the next five years.

In 2013, they partnered with USA Today on the publication's yearly 10Best award in travel.

In February 2018, Liberty Travel launched a new “Home-Based” Travel Agent Brand to give travel consultants more control over their business.
