= American Express Global Business Travel =

Travel management company

Global Business Travel Group, Inc.
- Type: Public
- Traded as: NYSE: GBTG
- Headquarters: New York City, United States
- Area served: Worldwide
- Key people: Paul Abbott (CEO)
- Services: Corporate travel management, event management
- Revenue: ▲US$2.72 billion (2025)
- Net income: ▲US$109 million (2025)
- Owner: American Express (30.1%); Qatar Investment Authority (16.7%); Expedia Group (14.3%)
- Number of employees: 18,000
- Website: amexglobalbusinesstravel.com

Global Business Travel Group, Inc. (American Express Global Business Travel or simply Amex GBT) is a multinational travel management company headquartered in New York City. Amex GBT has 18,000 employees in more than 140 countries. American Express holds a minority interest in Amex GBT, but the travel company operates as a separate entity from the financial services group.

== History ==
In 2003, Amex GBT acquired Rosenbluth International from Hal Rosenbluth in a "mega deal" that combined two of the top global travel agencies at the time.

In 2014 American Express divested their Global Business Travel division for an investment of $900 million to an investor group creating American Express Global Business Travel. The investment group was led by Certares LP and included Qatar Holdings, Macquarie Capital and funds managed by BlackRock and Teacher Retirement System of Texas. American Express maintained 50-percent ownership of the newly created American Express Global Business Travel (GBT).

In December 2021, American Express GBT announced plans to become a publicly traded company through a business combination with Apollo Strategic Growth Capital, a special-purpose acquisition company (SPAC) backed by Apollo Global Management.

Following the completion of the business combination with Apollo Strategic Growth Capital on May 27, 2022, the company began trading on the New York Stock Exchange on May 31, 2022, with the symbol GBTG.

In May 2026, Long Lake Management announced acquisition of the company for about USD6.3B. The acquisition is intended to be funded by Long Lake's "existing investors, Koch Equity Development, and committed debt financing provided by JPMorgan (JPM), Bank of America (BAC), Citi (C), and Mitsubishi UFJ (MUFG). / American Express (AXP), Expedia Group (EXPE), Qatar Investment Authority, and BlackRock (BLK) collectively represent 69% of GBT's shares."

=== Acquisitions ===
- October 2003: Rosenbluth International
- August 2016: KDS[i]
- May 2016: SMT Travel Agency
- June 2017: Banks Sadler
- February 2018: Hogg Robinson Group
- August 2019: Kanoo Travel
- June 2019: DER Business Travel
- October 2020: 30SecondstoFly
- January 2021: Ovation
- May 2021: Egencia
- September 2025: CWT
