= SAP Concur =

American expense management software company

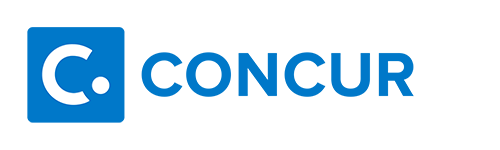
- Formerly: Concur Technologies
- Type: Subsidiary
- Industry: Software (Travel & Expense Management)
- Founded: 1993; 33 years ago
- Founders: Rajeev Singh; Steve Singh; Mike Hilton
- Headquarters: Bellevue, Washington, United States
- Key people: Jim Lucier, President
- Number of employees: 4,600+
- Parent: SAP SE
- Website: www.concur.com

SAP Concur (formerly Concur Technologies) is an American software as a service company providing travel and expense management services to businesses. Its headquarters are in Bellevue, Washington. SAP SE agreed to acquire Concur Technologies in September 2014 for $8.3 billion. The deal was completed in December 2014.

== History ==
Concur Technologies was co-founded by Mike Hilton and brothers Rajeev and Steve Singh. It was headed by Mike Eberhard from November 2016 until April 2019, when he stepped down and was replaced by Jim Lucier as company president.

The company's headquarters are in Bellevue, Washington, with additional offices in Eden Prairie and St. Louis Park, Minnesota, Allen, Texas, and Vienna, Virginia, in the USA, as well as in Asia, Australia, and Europe.

In 2014, SAP entered into an agreement to acquire Concur Technologies for US$8.3 billion. The acquisition was completed on December 4, 2014.

In 2016, Concur acquired Hipmunk, a startup company offering a flight and hotel search website.

During an August 2018 briefing, the Department of Defense announced that it was partnering with SAP Concur to update the Defense Travel System used for its active duty, reserve, and civilian personnel.

== See also ==
- Application service provider
- Expense management
- Web application
