= Corporate travel management =

Function in a business

Corporate travel management is the function of managing a company’s strategic approach to travel (travel policy), the negotiations with all vendors, day-to-day operation of the corporate travel program, traveler safety and security, credit-card management and travel and expenses ('T&E') data management.

CTM should not be confused with the work of a traditional travel agency. While agencies provide the day-to-day travel services to corporate clients, they are the implementing arm of what the corporation has negotiated and put forth in policy. In other words, CTM decides on the class of service which employees are allowed to fly, negotiates corporate fares with airlines and hotels and determines how corporate credit cards are to be used. The agency on the other hand makes the actual reservation within the parameters given by the corporation.

For many companies, T&E costs represent the second highest controllable annual expense, exceeded only by salary and benefits, and are commonly higher than IT or real estate costs. T&E costs are not only limited to travel (airline, rail, hotel, car rental, ferry/boat, etc.) but include all costs incurred during travel such as staff and client meals, taxi fares, gratuities, client gifts, supplies (office supplies and services), etc. Furthermore, this area often includes meeting management, traveler safety and security as well as credit card and overall travel data management.

The management of these costs is usually handled by the Corporate Travel Manager, a function which may be part of the Finance, HR, Procurement or Administrative Services Department.

Effective corporate travel management goes beyond mere cost control; it plays a pivotal role in enhancing employee satisfaction and retention. Travel policies tailored to the needs of the workforce can significantly improve job satisfaction by reducing travel-related stress and ensuring that employees feel valued and cared for during their travels. Moreover, advanced analytics and travel data management enable corporations to make informed decisions that can lead to more strategic travel planning and potential savings.

As businesses become increasingly global, the ability to manage travel effectively becomes a competitive advantage, allowing companies to nurture important client relationships and facilitate essential face-to-face interactions in an increasingly digital world.

== Global consolidations ==
Many companies, especially large multinationals (MNC), opt for global consolidation of their travel procurement. In other words, they may choose to put their entire purchasing of travel arrangements in the hands of one Travel Management Company (TMC). This is almost always done with a global Request for Proposal (RFP), through which the company will invite major TMCs to participate in the RFP. The process and the selection of the TMC could take several months. Once the company has chosen its TMC, the handling of their travel arrangements will be handled by the selected TMC throughout the world. There could, of course, be exceptions in certain countries.

The advantages of a global consolidation lie in the game of numbers: the company will be able to bring to the table the advantage of global numbers when negotiating with suppliers. These negotiations could include airlines, hotel chains, individual hotels (for specific reasons), car-rental companies, etc. The main goal of going the route of global consolidation is to create savings in the company's T&E budget.

== Travel management companies ==
Corporate travel management is often delegated to Travel Management Companies (TMC). A TMC will manage an organization's corporate or business travel program and will often provide an online booking tool, mobile application, program management and consulting teams, executive travel services, meetings and events support, reporting functionality, and potentially others. These companies have historically used Global Distribution Systems (GDS) to book travel for their clients though these systems no longer provide complete content so these gaps need to be filled by additional aggregated, non-GDS, content. This allows the travel consultant to compare different itineraries and costs by displaying availability in real-time, allowing users to access fares for air tickets, hotel rooms and rental cars simultaneously.

== Travel management lite ==
Travel Management Lite, is a lightweight version of a Corporate Travel Management solution, generally used by SMEs and growth companies who don't require extensive or bespoke solutions offered by TMCs. The main advantage to a Lite solution is to enhance real-time transparency in travel spending across the company, and provides access to mobile and web apps needed to book and manage a company's travel. This allows business travelers, assistants, and travel managers to book more efficiently, and have faster access to support, than were they to use different leisure booking sites or offline travel agents.

== Ground transportation management ==
A large part of corporate transportation management covers Ground Transportation Management (GTM), which is provided by business travel agencies and business-to-business software vendors for corporate clients to consolidate and streamline the management of their ground transportation suppliers primarily to optimize travel costs, scheduling and organization.

In the corporate travel management system, GTM companies play a role of aggregator or virtual hubs for all ground transportation-related services. They act as mediators using databases, global distribution systems (GDS) and various industry-related platforms such as taxi and ridesharing companies, corporate fleets, public transportation and other alternatives to find optimal journeys for the travel users.

However, in the 21st century, GTMs' activity is not limited to a database search or benchmark pricing comparisons for transportation needs but encompasses a wide spectrum of business categories including travel assistance, accounting, expenditure management and travel analysis, among others.

Similar to the other types of transportation management companies, the quality of the company software and its integration with the cloud remain critical for coordination of transportation flow through scaling of different vendors and services to the needs of corporate clients.

Examples of companies in this category are Gett, AMEX GBT, Amadeus with those in business spend management such as Coupa, Expensify, and ExpenseOut.

Like most of the companies related to tourism and travel economy, the GMT business sector has been hit hard by the ongoing COVID-19 pandemic and travel restrictions in many countries around the world. However, with the vaccinations running in many countries, the GTM sector has shown some signs of recovery.

== Travel risk management ==
Travel Risk Management is, according to ISO 31030, a structured, evidence-based framework that helps organizations mitigate hazards associated with business travel. It dictates the policies, procedures, and governance needed to identify, assess, and treat travel-related risks. This systemic approach ensures employers fulfill their ethical and legal obligations to protect their workforce. The ISO norm can be downloaded from the ISO website to implement in an organisation.

The ISO standard requires measures to control travel risks. The aim is not to reduce the travel risk to zero, as this is impossible, but to make it manageable and acceptable. These countermeasures, for example, a safe travel course, or medical insurance, are not always easy for every organisation to implement. The implementation of these measures can be facilitated by travel risk management (TRM) companies. Examples of travel risk management companies include Centre for Safety and Development (CSD), International SOS, Crisis 24, and Control Risks.
