= ATPCO =

Business services company

- Company type: Private
- Industry: Travel technology Travel services
- Founded: 1965
- Headquarters: Dulles, Virginia, United States
- Key people: Brett Burgess, President and CEO
- Products: FareManager Fares and Rules; Routehappy; Architect; Express Contracts; Baggage Calculator
- Number of employees: 500 (2025)
- Website: www.atpco.net

The Airline Tariff Publishing Company (commonly known as ATPCO) is a privately held corporation that engages in the collection and distribution of fare and fare-related data for the airline and travel industry. ATPCO currently works with more than 440 airlines worldwide, and it supplies more than 99% of the industry’s intermediated fare data to all the major airfare pricing engines, storing over 446 million active fares in its database and managing an average of 18 million fare changes each day.

The users of ATPCO’s data are Global Distribution Systems (GDS), such as Sabre, Amadeus, Travelport, and their associated travel agents; the Central Reservation Systems (CRS) of airlines; online travel agencies (OTA) such as Expedia, Orbitz, and Travelocity; and other service providers in the travel industry.

In January 2020, Alex Zoghlin took over as the new President and CEO.

== Locations ==
Based near Washington Dulles International Airport, ATPCO also has offices in London and Singapore.

== Owners ==
The following airlines are owners of ATPCO:

- Air Canada
- Air France
- All Nippon Airways
- American Airlines
- British Airways
- Delta Air Lines
- KLM Royal Dutch Airlines
- LATAM Airlines
- Lufthansa German Airlines
- United Airlines

== History ==
The Air Traffic Conference of America, a body within the Air Transport Association of America (ATA), was founded in 1945 to publish passenger tariffs (fares). In 1958 it assumed publication of freight tariffs, formerly produced by Air Cargo, Inc., and in 1965 the group divested from ATA as an independent company, Airline Tariff Publishers, Inc. It was reorganized and took its current name in 1975.

In the 1980s and 1990s, ATPCO digitized the information filed on paper tariffs, automating manual processes and enabling electronic connectivity for airfares in the industry. In later decades, ATPCO has continued to automate more types of pricing and related data, such as baggage allowance and charges.

In 1994, ATPCO and six airlines entered into a consent decree with the United States Department of Justice Antitrust Division over its computerized fare information system. DOJ identified over 50 separate price fixing agreements covering hundreds of routes, amounting to hundreds of dollars in higher individual ticket prices, and between $238 million to $1.9 billion in total fare increases. ATPCO, following the DOJ guidance, worked with the DOJ to close gaps on how and when pricing changes could be shown in ATPCO’s systems. These gaps were closed and have remained so since 1994. These obligations were memorialized in a proposed Final Judgment, which was reviewed by a Court and approved as in the public interest. While the Final Judgment expired in 2004, the core tenets of the Final Judgment remain hard-coded into the ATPCO system today.

In February 2018, ATPCO acquired Routehappy. The acquisition increases ATPCO’s merchandising capabilities combining its flagship pricing data with Routehappy rich content.

A few months later, ATPCO was awarded a patent for its cacheless airline ticket pricing technology, which allows the calculation of all possible airline ticket prices, regardless of availability.

In 2022, ATPCO donated its collection of historical fares, rules, and routes to the Library of Congress, where they are now accessible to the public.

In 2023, ATPCO acquired 3Victors to expand ATPCO’s data with real-time capabilities to further support the transition to modern airline retailing.
