= Videcom International =

British travel technology company

Videcom International Limited
- Industry: Travel Technology
- Founded: 1972
- Headquarters: United Kingdom

Videcom International Limited is a United Kingdom travel technology company based in Henley-on-Thames. It designs, develops and provides modern computer reservations systems to airlines and the travel industry, specializing in the hosting and distribution of airline sales.

The system is connected to the Global Distribution Systems of Sabre, Amadeus, Galileo, Worldspan and Abacus, which travel agents use to make airline bookings, and is also connected to other airline systems for interline bookings. The IATA airline designator for Videcom is U1.

== History ==
Founded in 1972, the company originally manufactured computer terminals for uses throughout the aviation and travel sectors, including airline reservation centers, airport operations and travel agency systems. Over 450,000 computer terminals were manufactured between 1972 and 2002 and refurbishments are still supported today, with many units still in use globally at airlines and airports. The company diversified into airline software development in 1987.

In 1976, Videcom International along with British Airways, British Caledonian and CCL, launched Travicom, the world's first multi-access reservations system. It was wholly based on Videcom technology. They formed a network to thousands of travel agents in the UK providing distribution for 49 subscribing international airlines, including British Airways, British Caledonian, TWA, Pan American World Airways, Qantas, Singapore Airlines, Air France, Lufthansa, SAS, Air Canada, KLM, Alitalia, Cathay Pacific, JAL) and some African airlines. It allowed agents and airlines to communicate via a common distribution language and network, handling 97% of UK airline business trade bookings by 1987.

The system went on to be replicated by Videcom in other areas of the world including the Middle East (DMARS), New Zealand, Kuwait (KMARS), Ireland, Caribbean, United States and Hong Kong. The Travicom multi access system was eventually replaced by Galileo in the UK and in 1988, Travel Automations Services Ltd (trading as Travicom) changed its trading name to Galileo UK and agents using Travicom were migrated to Galileo.

Since the late 1980s to the current day, Videcom has continued to develop products mostly related to airlines and airports, including terminal emulator software, airport check-in systems, Common Use Terminal Equipment (CUTE), Aircraft Weight and Balance systems, Unit Load Device management, and a modern Airline Reservations System, including an integrated Departure Control System.

In 2004, Videcom sold some of their standalone products, such as standalone DCS, Weight and Balance and the Common Use System, to Ultra Electronics.

The new product suite, which the company has provided to approximately 35 airlines since 2001, includes VRS, the Airline Reservations Systems and an integrated Departure Control System used by regional and international airlines.

== Products used by airlines today ==
Inventory Hosting

- Airline Hosting Platform
- Fare Distribution
- Flight Scheduling
- GDS Distribution (Type A & Type B)
- IATA PNR's
- XML distribution

Internet Booking Engine

- Ancillary Sales
- Credit Card/Debit card transactions
- Customer profiling
- Low Fare Finder Calendar
- Online Check-in
- Seat Selection

Ticketing

- IATA Electronic Ticketing
- Paper Tickets
- Ticketless Travel

Global Distribution Systems Connected to:

- Amadeus
- Galileo
- Sabre
- Worldspan

Interline Sales

- Connected to other airlines
- IATA IET (Interline Eticket)

Reporting

- HTML, XML, CSV formats
- Management Information System
- Revenue Accounting*Revenue/Yield Management
- Sales Reports
- Ticketing data
