= Pseudo city code =

In the aviation industry, a pseudo city code, pseudo-city code, or office ID, is an alpha-numeric identifier for a corporate user of a computer reservation system (CRS) or global distribution system (GDS), typically a travel agency. The codes are typically 3 or 4 characters long, (although the Amadeus system uses up to nine characters), and are unique to a specific office of a travel agency. They are used to associate each agency's bookings with the agency, and also to identify private fares available to the agency.

Pseudo city codes (PCCs) have many uses in the airline industry. As well as identifying a particular office, they can be used to restrict or allocate certain privileges. The most common of these is privacy: an agent can normally only see bookings made in their PCC. A travel agency's head office or ticketing department may have more access and see all bookings made within the company.

The codes are also used to restrict those who can issue tickets, limiting access only to agencies with the required training and legal requirements.

Some GDS systems have a "training pseudo" where agents cannot make live bookings.

These restrictions also allow airlines to negotiate fares with a company and restrict it to an individual company. Only those agencies within that pseudo-city code will be able to access and sell the fare.

GDS examples are Galileo, Sabre, Amadeus.
