= Travel Technology Interactive =

Travel and holiday companies of France

Travel Technology Interactive Group
- Type: Société Anonyme
- Traded as: Euronext Paris: ALTTI
- ISIN: FR0010383877
- Industry: Travel Technology
- Founded: 2001; 25 years ago
- Headquarters: Paris, France
- Services: IT systems for the travel industry
- Number of employees: 200 (2016)
- Subsidiaries: TTI France; TTI do Brasil; TTI Asia; TTI Caraïbes; TTI Americas
- Website: ttinteractive.com

Travel Technology Interactive (also known as TTI) was a French-based IT software company that provided software to the airline industry. It was specialized in IT software for the management of airlines. It provided an Airline Reservations System with an integrated Global Distribution System (GDS).

== History ==
The company was originally created in 2001, as a dedicated IT company for Air Antilles Express. In 2005, it became an Amadeus IT Group worldwide business partner. In August 2006, it became an IATA StB Preferred Partner.

The next year, it acquired a competitor in Latin America, CIONS Software, a Brazilian IT company based in Ribeirão Preto (Brazil) and renamed it TTI do Brasil.

In November 2007, it opened its first subsidiary, TTI Caraïbes, based in Baie-Mahault (Guadeloupe). In May 2008, Travel Technology Interactive signed a cooperation agreement with Hahn Air for it to provide complementary BSP distribution services to Travel Technology Interactive's airline customers. In 2010, the company opened its subsidiary TTI Asia in Singapore.

On April 18, 2011, Travel Technology Interactive was listed on New York Stock Exchange (NYSE) Alternext in Paris. In 2016, a new subsidiary, TTI Americas, opened in Panama.

In 2024 the company was acquired by CitizenPlane.

== Customers ==
- Amelia International
- Air Chathams
- Fly Pelican
- Mexicana
- Southern Airways Express

== See also ==
- Amadeus IT Group
- Opodo
- Sabre
- Travelport
- Takeflite
- AeroCRS
