= Record locator =

Alphanumeric code used in airline reservation systems

In airline reservation systems, a record locator is an alphanumeric code used to identify and access a specific record on an airline’s reservation system. An airline’s reservation system automatically generates a unique record locator whenever a customer makes a reservation or booking, commonly known in the industry as an itinerary. When an itinerary is entered into the reservation system it is commonly known as a passenger name record (PNR). An itinerary may be entered into the system by a passenger, travel agent or airline employee.

The record locator typically appears on the itinerary provided to the passenger, and may be described as a confirmation number, reservation number, confirmation code, booking reference, booking code, or vendor locator, or other description, depending on the reservation system.

== Format ==
Record locators are created by each computer reservation system (CRS) and are specific to that CRS. They are typically 6 alphanumeric characters in length, though reservation systems using record locators of 7 or 8 characters exist. Record locators are unique within a given CRS at a specific point in time. Because the number of character combinations in characters is finite, albeit very large, record locators may be reused once the PNRs to which they refer have been purged from the CRS.

Because 1, I and L can be confused (also 0 and o) these characters are not always used in record locators. The pool of available character combinations is further reduced because the locator is actually a location address and there are rules about what character combinations can be used for such addresses.

== Use ==
When a reservation is made, a passenger name record (PNR) is created in the computer reservation system (CRS) used by the person making the booking, and the CRS will automatically generate a record locator for the PNR. If the only flight(s) are operated by the airline on which the booking is being made, then only one PNR will exist.

However, if a booking contains flights of more than one airline, then the reservation for both flights will typically be made through the first airline. The first airline will send messages and a copy of the PNR to the second airline confirming the reservation and the second airline will create a separate PNR with its own record locator generated by the second airline’s CRS. If the booking is made through a travel agent then a PNR (and record locator) will exist in the system used by the agency and further PNRs (each with their own record locator) will exist in each airline reservation system.

In recent years many airlines have stopped running their own reservation systems and have become clients of global distribution systems that provide hosting services. Where this occurs a single PNR (with just one record locator) may be created in the hosting system containing details of all the flights for which that hosting system is responsible. For example, a reservation for passenger traveling from London to Paris on Air France returning BA booked through AF will reside in one PNR in the Amadeus system with just one record locator because both airlines use Amadeus for reservations. If that booking is made through a travel agent using Amadeus, the same single PNR/record locator will exist. However, if the reservation is made via an agency using a different system (e.g. Sabre) there will be two PNRs (one in Sabre and one in Amadeus) each with its own locator.

Airline systems pass record locators between themselves as part of the confirmation process. Should a record locator fail to be passed between two systems the PNR can still be retrieved using flight number/date and name, or the ticket number.

== Example record locators ==
Example record locators are RMT33W, KZVGX5, IIRCYC.

In the past, the Reservec 2 system had eight character record locators in the form xxnnnnxx where x was a letter and n a decimal digit. Some CPARS (Compact Programmed Airlines Reservations System) systems used five character locators.
