= Axess (CRS) =

Axess (アクセス国際ネットワーク) is a computer reservations system based in Japan which provides its services in the Japanese market. It originated as the IT department of Japan Airlines called Jalinfotech. In 1991 it was established as an independent company it began to be marketed to travel agencies in Japan. In 1995 Axess partnered with Sabre Holdings in order to provide travel agencies in Japan with booking and ticketing capabilities for a wider range of international airlines.

On April 23, 2012, Travelport, the business services provider to the global travel industry, announced a long-term agreement with AXESS International Network, the leading Japanese GDS owned by Japan Airlines (JAL). Under the new agreement, AXESS will be hosted by Travelport in its Atlanta data center as a partition of the Travelport global distribution system. The new upgraded AXESS GDS system, which will provide enhanced functionality to connected travel agency users, will be implemented by 2013.

By adopting Travelport's technology infrastructure, the AXESS GDS system will be enhanced with improved connectivity to airlines and a significant increase in the range of fares, shopping, hotel and car rental capabilities available for use by Japanese travel agencies and corporations.

AXESS confirmed it had selected Travelport as its partner due to the two companies' mutual alignment on strategic thinking and saw the agreement as a significant step forward in reinforcing AXESS's position as the GDS of choice in the Japanese travel industry.

JAL-affiliated AXESS International Network announced on October 2, 2019, that its operating GDS 'AXESS' will terminate its services on March 31, 2021

== See also ==
- Airline reservations system
- Japan Airlines
- Travelport
