= HotelsByDay =

Provider of intraday hotel spaces

- Type: Private
- Industry: Hospitality, Travel technology
- Founded: 2015
- Founders: Yannis Moati, Brian Dass, Nathan Stevenson
- Services: Daytime hotel bookings
- Website: www.hotelsbyday.com/en

HotelsByDay is an American travel technology company that partners with hotels to offer flexible daytime room bookings. Founded in 2015, the company enables travelers to reserve hotel rooms for short stays during the day, catering to business travelers, travelers with long layovers, and local residents seeking day-use accommodations.

== History ==
HotelsByDay was founded in 2015 by Yannis Moati and Brian Dass to address what they identified as an inefficiency in hotel operations: rooms left vacant during daytime hours. The platform initially launched in major U.S. cities, including New York City, providing access to hotel inventory for daytime bookings at discounted rates.

2014 – Yannis Moati along with cofounders Nathan Stevenson and Brian Dass, conceived the idea for a short-stay hotel booking platform in response to the growth of on-demand services and the sharing economy.

2015 – HotelsByDay launched its initial website, featuring approximately 10 hotel properties in New York City, primarily near airports.

2016 – HotelsByDay expanded its U.S. coverage, with daytime bookings available in Chicago, Philadelphia, New York City and Washington, D.C., and additional markets including Miami, Fort Lauderdale, Los Angeles, Atlanta, Boston and Charlotte scheduled to follow.

2017 – HotelsByDay featured on Shark Tank, Season 8, Episode 17.

2018 – HotelsByDay completed an equity crowdfunding campaign on WeFunder that met its funding goal.

2019 – HotelsByDay expanded its operations to the United Kingdom.

2020 – The onset of the COVID-19 pandemic led to an approximately 80% decline in bookings in March, followed by a rebound in April, as day-use hotel rooms were sometimes used by remote workers seeking a change of environment.

2020 – HotelsByDay reported doubling its hotel inventory as properties from multiple countries joined the platform.

2021 – With the return of leisure travel, HotelsByDay experienced a decline in available day-use room inventory, as many partner hotels reallocated rooms to overnight guests.

2022 – HotelsByDay entered into its first direct-connect agreement with a major hotel brand, resulting in a significant increase in its inventory and expansion to seven countries, including the United States, Canada, the United Kingdom, France, Italy, Germany, and Spain.

2023 – The company transitioned to a fully remote corporate structure, with staff located across seven countries.

2024 – HotelsByDay partnered with DerbySoft to enable global distribution of their day-use booking inventory, expanding technological reach and availability in multiple countries.

2024 – HotelsByDay reported further geographic expansion into Latin America.

== Services ==
Alongside its geographic growth, HotelsByDay’s core offering allows guests to book hotel rooms for blocks of time during the day, typically between three and eleven hours. This model serves travelers in need of a space to rest, work, or freshen up during layovers or between meetings, without paying for an overnight stay.

The platform operates in partnership with hotels across the United States and Canada, offering inventory through its website and mobile application.

GeekSpin highlighted the service in 2023 as a cost-effective option for travelers needing short-term stays, noting its flexibility for purposes ranging from layovers to workspace rental.

== Business model ==
HotelsByDay generates revenue through commissions on each successful booking made via its platform. Participating hotels monetize rooms that might otherwise remain empty during daytime hours. This approach allows properties to increase occupancy rates and revenue without adding new overnight guests. The company primarily works with premium and boutique hotels, positioning the service as an alternative to coworking spaces or airport lounges for travelers seeking privacy and amenities.

== Reception ==
HotelsByDay has been featured in several publications highlighting its role in the growing trend of flexible hotel bookings. TIME Magazine noted the company’s goal of offering short hotel stays for needs such as jet lag recovery or workspace rentals, aiming to overcome stereotypes associated with hourly hotel bookings. Skift recognized HotelsByDay among new travel startups that simplify transactions for travelers, citing the convenience of booking hotel rooms for daytime use without overnight commitments. In July 2024, The New York Times profiled the growing trend of purchasing hotel amenities without overnight stays, noting HotelsByDay’s role in enabling customers to book access to pools, spas, and other facilities for part of the day. This coverage emphasized the company’s expansion into amenity-based day passes, complementing its core daytime room booking services.

== Company development & international expansion ==
Building on partnerships and expansions announced in 2024, HotelsByDay’s footprint has continued to grow beyond its early U.S. focus through city-by-city launches, direct-connect agreements with hotel brands, and additional distribution partnerships. These integrations have increased available inventory and enabled additional offerings such as work rooms, meeting spaces, and event venues across North America, Europe, and Latin America. Industry coverage has also noted continued growth in partnerships and flexible pricing options for short-term access.

== See also ==
- Hospitality industry
- Hotel reservation system
- Travel technology
- Coworking
- Jet lag
