= Travicom =

Galileo International
- Formerly: Travicom
- Industry: Travel technology
- Headquarters: United Kingdom
- Area served: Worldwide

Travicom was the trading name of Travel Automation Services Ltd, a travel technology company based in the United Kingdom providing a global distribution system between airlines and travel agencies.

In 1976, Videcom with British Airways, British Caledonian and CCL launched Travicom, the world's first multi-access reservations system, (wholly based on Videcom technology), forming a network providing distribution for initially 2 and later 49 subscribing international airlines (including British Airways, British Caledonian, TWA, Pan American World Airways, Qantas, Singapore Airlines, Air France, Lufthansa, SAS, Air Canada, KLM, Alitalia, Cathay Pacific and JAL). The initial system supported little more than 100 terminals but subsequent developments allowed most of the IATA licensed agencies in the UK to access the system. The system allowed agents to use the same entry formats for all the connected airlines' systems. The displays were returned in the format used by each airline system. By 1987 Travicom was handling 97% of UK airline business trade bookings.

The system was replicated by Videcom in other areas of the world including the Middle East (DMARS), New Zealand, Kuwait (KMARS), Ireland, the Caribbean, United States and Hong Kong.

The Travicom UK multi-access system was closed and replaced by the system called Galileo ean airlines' systems were still skewed toward their owners. in the UK today and in 1988 Travicom changed its trading name to Galileo UK. Later, British Airways sold Galileo UK to Galileo International.

== British Airways and Sabre controversy ==
In 1987, Sabre's success in selling to European travel agents was inhibited by the refusal of the big European carriers led by British Airways to grant the system ticketing authority for their flights, even though Sabre had obtained BSP clearance for the UK in 1986. American Airlines brought a High Court action which alleged that British Airways, after the arrival of Sabre on its doorstep, immediately offered financial incentives to travel agents who continued to use Travicom and would tie any override commissions to use of the Travicom system.

British Airways eventually bought out the stakes in Travicom held by Videcom and British Caledonian to become the sole owner, and although Sabre's vice-president in London, David Schwarte, made representations to the US Department of Transportation and the British Monopolies Commission, BA defended the use of Travicom as a truly non-discriminatory system in flight selection because an agent had access to some 50 carriers worldwide, including Sabre, for flight information.
