= Lighthouse (company) =

- Formerly: OTA Insight
- Type: Private company
- Industry: Travel technology, Hospitality technology
- Founded: 2012
- Founders: Gino Engels, Matthias Geeroms
- Headquarters: London, United Kingdom
- Products: Commercial intelligence platform for hotels
- Number of employees: 700+
- Website: mylighthouse.com

Lighthouse (formerly OTA Insight) is a British commercial intelligence platform for the travel and hospitality industry, headquartered in London, United Kingdom. Founded in 2012 in Ghent, Belgium by Gino Engels and Matthias Geeroms, the company provides AI-powered pricing, business intelligence and revenue management tools for hotels and short-term rental operators. As of 2024 the platform is used by over 70,000 hospitality providers across 185 countries, including major chains such as Holiday Inn, Radisson and NH Hotel Group. In November 2024 the company achieved unicorn status following a $370 million Series C investment led by KKR.

== History ==
Lighthouse was founded in 2012 in Ghent, Belgium, as OTA Insight, by Gino Engels and Matthias Geeroms with the aim of solving one of the hospitality industry's persistent challenges: managing bookings, pricing and revenue efficiently. The idea originated during a trip to the London Olympics. The company later relocated its headquarters to London.

In November 2021 the company raised an $80 million Series B round led by Spectrum Equity, with participation from existing investors Eight Roads, F-Prime Capital and Highgate Technology Ventures, bringing total funding to $100 million at the time.

=== Acquisitions ===
Following the Series B, OTA Insight pursued an acquisition strategy to expand its product portfolio. In March 2022, it acquired Madrid-based vacation rental market intelligence company Transparent. One month later, in April 2022, it acquired Dallas-based hotel revenue intelligence platform Kriya RevGen, whose Spider Analytics product streamlined data collection and reporting across hotel portfolios.

In February 2024, Lighthouse acquired Belgium-based Stardekk, a provider of hospitality channel management and distribution software founded in 2001 with over 3,000 customers in 55 countries. The acquisition was the company's third since the 2021 Series B and brought an all-in-one hotel software for managing reservations.

In May 2026, Lighthouse acquired Hotelrank.ai, a French company that tracks the appearance of hotels in AI-generated search results and travel recommendations.

=== Rebrand ===
In 2023 the company rebranded from OTA Insight to Lighthouse, consolidating multiple acquired brands and products under a single unified commercial platform. The new name was chosen to symbolise the company's role in guiding hospitality operators through complex data.

=== Series C and unicorn status ===
In November 2024 Lighthouse closed a $370 million Series C round led by KKR through its Next Generation Technology III Fund, with participation from existing investors Spectrum Equity, F-Prime Capital, Eight Roads Ventures and Highgate Technology Ventures. The round valued the company at over $1 billion, making Lighthouse a unicorn and Europe's twelfth unicorn of 2024. At $370 million, the round was one of the largest for a startup headquartered in London and among the biggest in the travel sector that year. Total funding raised stands at approximately $470 million.

Stephen Shanley, KKR's Head of Tech Growth in Europe, described Lighthouse as "the leading platform in this space" with strong customer loyalty and a proven ability to deliver value across market segments.

== Product ==
Lighthouse processes over 400 terabytes of travel and market data daily and uses AI to deliver real-time insights to hospitality operators.

In 2024 the platform extended its coverage to short-term rentals alongside traditional hotels, drawing on data from over 19 million short-term rental properties globally.

== Recognition ==
Lighthouse has won the HotelTechAwards for five consecutive years (2021–2025), taking top honours in categories including rate shopping, market intelligence and business intelligence. The awards are determined annually based on customer feedback from over 2.5 million hotel industry professionals on HotelTechReport.com.
