= Max Hopper =

American IT manager and CIO (1934-2010)

Max D. Hopper
- Born: November 4, 1934; Lufkin, Texas, U.S.
- Died: January 25, 2010 (aged 75); Dallas, Texas, U.S.
- Education: Bachelor's degree in mathematics Master's degree in Management Sciences
- Alma mater: University of Houston
- Employer: American Airlines
- Known for: pioneer of Airline Reservations Systems
- Spouse(s): Jo Hopper & Marilyn Hicketheir Hopper
- Parent: Irving Washington Hopper (b. 1910)

Max D. Hopper (November 4, 1934 – January 25, 2010) was an American IT manager, who served as the CIO of Bank of America, the SVP (IS) of American Airlines (AA) and the chairman of the Sabre group. In 1992 Computerworld named him among the top 25 greatest contributors to the field of information systems.

== Biography ==
Max Hopper was born in a log house near Lufkin, Texas, to Irvin Washington Hopper (b. 1910) and Norma Dunn Hopper (b. 1913). He grew up near Lufkin, and was educated at the Central Consolidated School and the Texas City High School.

In 1952, while he was still at UT, Hopper's family moved to Houston for his father's job. His mother became pregnant with his younger brother Ricky shortly before the move, and left her job. The family faced financial problems, but his mother helped him finish the semester by borrowing money. He took up summer jobs in Houston in 1953 to support himself financially.

In 1954, Hopper applied for the position of a research lab technician at the Shell Oil Company. He got one of the highest grades ever in the company's IQ test, which was full of mental arithmetic. He earned $330 a month on this job. Soon after getting his first job, Hopper married his 20-year-old girlfriend at the age of 19.

In January 1955, he and his younger brother were selected for the Army Security Agency, which he saw as an opportunity to continue his education (see G.I. Bill). Another factor that influenced his decision was the Shell's policy of paying a serviceman 1/2 of his salary to bridge the gap between his military pay and his total pay.

During his service in the army, Hopper learned Morse code, and took up part-time courses at the University of Virginia's extension in Arlington. Apart from the math and the English courses, he started taking business courses: accounting, cost accounting, business law, economics etc.

Hopper got out of the army in January 1958. By this time, he had a one-year-old son, who was born at Fort Belvoir. His accounting professor, who worked at CIA, wanted him to work for them and offered him a job. The NSA also offered him a job to go into their educational program. However, Hopper decided to go back to Texas and went back to Shell. He decided to go part-time to the University of Houston and obtained a bachelor's degree in mathematics. After this, he wanted to study operations research, but Shell decided to transfer him to New York. Also, his advisor left academia for a job in Cleveland, and he never finished his thesis.

=== IT career ===
While working for Shell, Hopper became interested in computers. The first computer he used was a Burroughs Elecom 101, which he described as a "play toy". He moved to New York with his family in 1964. This was the year when Sabre came out, so he started studying Sabre.

In 1967, the Electronic Data Systems (EDS) offered him a job, which he turned down. It was at this time that Shell decided to move him to The Hague (the headquarters of Royal Dutch), but his wife didn't want to go overseas. Therefore, he joined EDS as a system engineer, and worked on a project to develop a reservation system for the United Airlines. In 1970, he left EDS to join United Airlines.

Hopper is best remembered for his work on the Sabre computer reservation system used by airlines, railways, hotels, travel agents and other travel companies. The system had a huge impact on the travel agency market. Hopper joined American Airlines in 1972 as director of Sabre. Professor James I. Cash Jr. of the Harvard Business School described him as "the first person who really defined the marketing leverage that could come from using technology". In the late 1980s, Hopper pioneered systems integration when he led the development of InterAAct, a landmark desktop network at American Airlines.

In 1982, Hopper left AA to join Bank of America as VP. However, he joined American Airlines again in 1985, this time as the Senior Vice President of Information Technology. He retired in 1995, as the chairman of Sabre Group, a unit of AMR Corporation, the parent company of American Airlines.

After his retirement in 1995, Hopper founded a consulting firm, Max D. Hopper Associates specializing in the strategic use of advanced information systems.

Hopper served on the Board of Directors or advisory boards for several corporations, including Gartner, Perficient, Metrocall, Payless Cashways, USDATA Corporation, Exodus Communications, United Stationers, Airgate PCS, Instantis, Accrue Software, and GT Nexus (formerly Tradiant) In addition, he also served on the advisory councils or executive boards of several educational institutions, including the Graduate School of Management for the University of Texas at Dallas and the Southern Methodist University's School of Engineering and Applied Science.

=== Death intestate and lawsuit ===
Hopper died intestate and his family hired JPMorgan Chase to administer his estate of over $19 million. The family eventually sued the bank for fraud, breach of fiduciary duty, and breaking a fee agreement, winning damages of $4 billion [sic] to be divided among Hopper's widow and his two children from a prior marriage.

== Positions held ==
- President, Max D. Hopper Associates Inc., Dallas
- 1993–1995: Chairman, The Sabre Group, AMR Corp.
- 1985–1993: Senior vice president of IS, American Airlines
- 1982–1985: Executive vice president and CIO, Bank of America

== Awards and recognition ==
- 1991: Society for Information Management's Partners in Leadership award for his contribution to InterAAct.
- 1992: Computerworld recognized Hopper among the top 25 greatest contributions to the field of Information Systems.
- 1995: Data Processing Management Association's (DPMA) Distinguished Information Sciences Award
- 1997: Inducted into Infomart's Information Hall of Fame
- 1997: Recognized by CIO Magazine as the "pre-eminent modern-era CIO and a founding father of IT-inspired competitive advantage".
- 1999: Named by CIO magazine among the decade's 12 most influential information system executives
- 2000: Leadership Award for Collaborative Innovation at the 2000 Computerworld Honors Program
