= Cultuzz =

German IT and Internet company

Cultuzz Digital Media GmbH
- Type: Private Limited Company
- Industry: Travel Technology
- Founded: 2000; 26 years ago
- Founder: Dr Reinhard Vogel
- Headquarters: Berlin, Germany
- Area served: Worldwide
- Number of employees: Over 100
- Website: www.cultuzz.com

Cultuzz Digital Media GmbH is an IT and Internet company that specializes in software for e-commerce in the travel and tourism industry. It has its headquarters in Berlin, Germany and subsidiaries in Switzerland, India, UK and US. Its main product is CultSwitch which is a channel management software allowing hotels to transfer their products, availability and prices to the different travel websites (source). Cultuzz is the only travel technical provider to be connected to the eBay API via XML technology. Since 2002, Cultuzz supports hotels to market and sell their hotel products and services on the eBay.

== History ==
Cultuzz was founded in 2000 in Germany by Dr Reinhard Vogel. Cultuzz developed a professional search engine for eBay in 2006, allowing the site's users to check availability and make actual bookings from hotel inventories. In 2008, Cultuzz offered the first complete interface to Tiscover, thus linking major distributors and portals directly with the accommodation providers. To enable hotel advertising on eBay for commission-free bookings, Cultuzz created professional microsites with unique special functions for eBay.

Cultuzz linked its channel management system CultSwitch to the four Global Distribution Systems (GDS) Amadeus, Sabre, Worldspan and Galileo, as well as to the Pegasus Online Distribution Database (ODD) for making partner hotels of Cultuzz reach every travel agency worldwide.

In March 2011, RateTiger integrated with Cultuzz enabling its hotels to generate bookings from eBay, making it the only service provider worldwide that implemented direct bookings for hotels on eBay.

Around the same time, agoda.com also partnered with Cultuzz Media giving them the ability to offer people a greater choice of hotels across Europe.

== Products ==
- CultSwitch – It is a channel management software that allows hotels to manage their online inventory across various distribution channels using a single interface. This innovative hotel data administration system helps hotel management to save enormous amount of time and resources. Hotel prices and descriptions are saved on a secure web server of Cultuzz and distributed via OTA-standard interfaces to several booking partners.
- CultBooking – It is a “free to download” hotel booking system made available as an open source product for hoteliers, owners of pensions, hotel chains and destination marketing organisations.
