= Siteminder =

Technology company offering an e-commerce platform

SiteMinder
- Company type: Public limited company
- Website type: Travel technology company
- Founded: 2006; 20 years ago Sydney, Australia
- Headquarters: Sydney, Australia
- Area served: Global
- CEO: Sankar Narayan
- Website: www.siteminder.com
- Commercial: Yes
- Launched: 2008; 18 years ago
- Current status: Online

SiteMinder Limited (ASX:SDR) is a travel technology company, which has been publicly listed on the Australian Stock Exchange since November 2021. The company owns and operates brands including SiteMinder and Little Hotelier, and specialises in providing guest acquisition platforms and commerce solutions for accommodation providers from around the world. SiteMinder’s global headquarters are in Sydney, and it has offices in London, Bangkok, Dallas, Galway, Berlin, Manila, Barcelona and Pune. In November 2023, SiteMinder was estimated to have 970 employees, a 17% increase compared to the same period in 2022.

As of June 2023, SiteMinder’s annual revenue was AU$152.27m, having grown 29.89% YoY during Q2 (5), while its market capitalization was AU$1.30b as of the 9th November 2023. The company’s business model is part recurring subscription revenue, part one-time transaction fees.

== History ==
SiteMinder Limited was founded in 2006 by Mike Ford and Mike Rogers, with the goal of “breaking down boundaries and challenging how travel is distributed and sold”. In 2014, SiteMinder became the first technology company based in Australia to be backed by Silicon Valley’s Technology Crossover Ventures (TCV), joining the likes of Facebook, Netflix and LinkedIn as a TCV investment.

On the 9th November 2018, SiteMinder announced the appointment of Sankar Narayan as the company’s first CEO, joining from cloud accounting software giant Xero, where he had been Chief Operating Officer.

On the 8th November 2021, SiteMinder debuted on the Australian Stock Exchange (ASX). Prior to floating on the ASX, SiteMinder received investments from Technology Crossover Ventures, BlackRock, Bailador, Ellerston Capital, Australian Super, Fidelity International, Washington H. Soul Pattinson and Pendal Group.

In August 2022, SiteMinder announced the purchase of Estonia-based hospitality tech startup GuestJoy, Estonia-based hospitality tech startup GuestJoy.

On 26 October 2023, the CEO of SiteMinder Limited, Sankar Narayan, released a letter titled “An open letter to the global hotel industry”, noting the accommodation industry’s lack of digitization, and stating that “as we at SiteMinder surpass our 17th year in the business, the time feels right to usher in a new era that’s anything but resistant to movement”.

== Brands ==
SiteMinder

SiteMinder offers technology to accommodation providers worldwide, empowering them to sell, market, manage and grow their business. The company's online platform offers accommodation providers a range of products and solutions to manage and streamline the distribution of their rooms across a wide selection of direct and indirect channels, take bookings from guests, communicate with guests, design and create websites, receive market insights and analytics, manage their properties, and process payments.

Little Hotelier

Little Hotelier is an all-in-one hotel software aimed at small accommodation providers, helping them to manage their properties, attract more guests, convert direct bookings, maintain their websites and take online payments. Among its notable features are a mobile app for use on-the-go.

== Awards & Recognition ==
SiteMinder is consistently recognised as a leader in the hotel software category. Recent awards include:

2026 Hotel Tech Report - Best eCommerce Platform

2026 Hotel Tech Report - Best Channel Manager

2026 Hotel Tech Report - Best Booking Engine

2026 Hotel Tech Report - Best Metasearch Management Software

2026 Hotel Tech Report - Best Hotel Website Design Tool
