= Sinohotel =

Travel and holiday companies of China

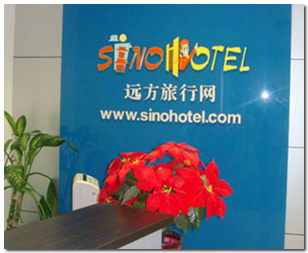
Sinohotel office in Beijing

Sinohotel Travel Network is an online hotel reservations and travel planning company in Beijing serving international travelers to China. It is a multilingual site, using English, Chinese, Japanese, and Korean to display the latest information about hotels and destinations around China with operations based in Beijing.

== History ==
The company was created by founder Janet Tang in 1999 under the name Sinohotel.com to use the burgeoning power of search engines to fill a perceived void of hotel information. Sinohotel was one of the first hotel reservation websites in China, offering the hotel information and reservation for overseas market and local market.

Tang, a graduate of Wuhan University, came to Beijing in 1995, found many overseas friends had difficulty to find the suitable hotel in China, then she set up the website with a small operation in Beijing. The website (and industry as a whole) has survived various unforeseen catastrophic events, including the “dot com” meltdown of 2000–2001, as well as the SARS outbreak in 2003, both of which devastated the travel industry.

After 2003, Sinohotel's company size became bigger. In 2005, Sinohotel began to focus on arranging theme and culture tours for small groups, especially those seeking a typical China experience, including not only sightseeing but also exclusive glimpses into the life of local communities and exploration of the cultural heritages of this ancient country. In 2008, the sinohotel was prized as the best travel website aimed at the oversea market in China.

In 2010, as the World Expo 2010 was approaching, Sinohotel.com was recommended again by The Wall Street Journey as an accommodation site in China.

== Awards ==
Sinohotel has won the best travel website aimed overseas market in China 2008.

== Activity ==
In 2005, sinohotel joined WHL sustainable tourism links that financially supported by the IFC and world bank.

In 2008, sinohotel.com promoted the tours for Beijing Olympics, recommended by The Wall Street Journey.

In 2009, sinohotel.com promoted the tours & hotels booking for World Expo 2010 Shanghai.

March 1, 2010, sinohotel.com built the partnership with eLong, Inc.

March 15, 2013, eLong closed the website of sinohotel.com.
