= Hotel consolidator =

Wholesaler of hotel rooms

A hotel consolidator (also called a hotel broker) is a travel company (travel agency or tour operator) or business that buys up blocks of hotel rooms at a predetermined destination and then resells them as package holidays or at discounted rates to final customers. By reselling at a predetermined discount, consolidators can create a market for discounted hotel deals online and pass savings to their customers. Global hotel consolidators usually offer discounted rooms in major tourist destinations, big cities, or popular resorts, while local consolidators focus only on business and competition within particular geographic areas.

Hotel consolidation can be separated into two main operations: (1) buying blocks of rooms at volume discounts at predetermined destinations, and (2) distributing “excess rooms” offered by hotels not anticipating full occupancy for given dates.

As compared to requesting discounts on an individual basis, hotel consolidators are able to achieve much larger savings due to their buying power. By offering reduced room rates to consolidators, hotels can theoretically yield a greater number of reservations, and thus raise greater profit.

== See also ==
- Airline consolidator
