= CIO (magazine) =

Technology and IT magazine

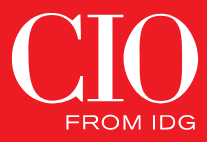

- Group Executive Editor: Jason Snyder
- Categories: Business magazine
- Frequency: Continuous
- First issue: 1987; 39 years ago
- Final issue: November 2015 (print)
- Company: FoundryCo, Inc. (Regent LP)
- Country: United States
- Based in: Needham, Massachusetts
- Language: English
- Website: www.cio.com
- ISSN: 0894-9301
- OCLC: 1409740938

CIO is a website and digital publication, published by Foundry (a subsidiary of Regent LP previously owned by International Data Corporation), focused on information technology leadership, enterprise IT strategy, and the responsibilities of the chief information officer. The title dates back to 1987, when it launched as a print magazine at a time when the chief information officer title, first defined in 1981, was still emerging in corporate America. Print production ended in 2015, and CIO has since continued as a website supported by newsletters and other digital formats.

== History ==
CIO was founded in 1987 in Framingham, Massachusetts, by IDG Communications, the publishing arm of International Data Group (IDG). Founding publisher Joseph L. Levy launched the magazine on a lean budget, running the operation with just four employees, including himself, supplemented by freelancers. Once the magazine gained traction, Levy began organizing executive conferences for CIOs, building an events and community side of the brand alongside the publication itself.

CIO's companion website was already in existence by 1996, alongside the print magazine. On October 29, 2015, then editor-in-chief Maryfran Johnson announced the end of the print edition, with the publication continuing as a purely digital title.

=== Ownership and Management ===
CIO has been under IDG's ownership, in one corporate form or another, since its founding in 1987. In February 2022, IDG's global technology publishing arm, IDG Communications, was rebranded as Foundry. In March 2025, Foundry (including CIO) was acquired by the private equity firm Regent LP. The sale was part of a wider expansion of Regent's media holdings: one day after acquiring Foundry, Regent also acquired TechCrunch from Yahoo, bringing both publishers under common ownership.

Foundry also publishes several sites alongside CIO, including CSO, Computerworld, InfoWorld, and Network World on the B2B technology side, and PCWorld, Macworld, and TechAdvisor as consumer-facing brands.

=== Editorial leadership ===
CIO was founded by Joseph L. Levy, its founding president and publisher, with Marcia Blumenthal as founding editor.

As of 2026, Jason Snyder serves as Group Executive Editor for CIO and CSO.

== Notable editors and contributors ==
CIO's editorial staff and contributors have included founding editor Marcia Blumenthal and founding publisher Joseph L. Levy. Former editor-in-chief Maryfran Johnson also served as editor-in-chief of sister publication Computerworld and founded CIO Decisions, a separate IDG magazine for IT executives at midsized companies that launched in 2005. Longtime columnist Martha Heller has written for CIO since 1999 and is the author of Be the Business: CIOs in the New Era of IT.

== Coverage ==
CIO covers IT leadership, digital and AI-driven business transformation, IT strategy, enterprise applications, and IT careers, aimed primarily at chief information officers and other senior technology executives.

== International editions ==
CIO is published internationally, including editions in Japan, South Korea, and Spain. Germany has its own dedicated edition.

As the chief information officer role gained recognition outside the United States, IDG extended the CIO brand into international markets. By 2005, the magazine was published in more than a dozen countries, including Australia, Canada, China, France, and Germany. Within that expansion, the 2002 launch of CIO Sweden was reported as the eleventh global CIO edition, following earlier launches across Europe and Asia, including CIO Korea. An Australian edition was also published, from 1997 to 2015. Editions currently active include the United States, Japan, South Korea, Spain, and Germany.

== Notable features and franchises ==
- State of the CIO Survey: an annual research survey on the CIO role, published continuously since 2002, based on responses from IT leaders and line-of-business executives each year.
- CIO 100 Awards: an annual award recognizing organizations that have distinguished themselves through effective and innovative use of information technology. Individual honorees have included Chris Kemp, who received the award in 2010 for his work as chief information officer of NASA's Ames Research Center. Beyond the U.S. program, CIO 100 and a related CIO50 format have been extended into regional editions, including the United Kingdom, India, Australia, New Zealand, Spain, Germany (branded as CIO of the Year Germany), the Middle East, and a joint ASEAN and Hong Kong edition.
- CIO Hall of Fame: an individual-focused recognition created in 1997 alongside the CIO 100 program, honoring IT leaders for their influence on the profession. The founding class of twelve included Max Hopper, the architect of American Airlines' Sabre reservation system, who has been credited with helping define the CIO role.The program remains active, inducting new members annually, with more than 200 people inducted as of the mid-2020s.
- 20/20 Vision Awards (2002): a one-time feature recognizing forty individuals for their influence on the business technology landscape, including Bill Gates, Jeff Bezos, Larry Ellison, Michael Dell, and Tim Berners-Lee.
- CIO Leadership Live: a video and podcast interview series featuring conversations with IT leaders. Beyond its original U.S. edition, the franchise has expanded into regional versions produced for audiences in Canada, the United Kingdom, Australia, and the Middle East, each featuring local CIOs and technology leaders rather than a single global lineup.

== Events ==
CIO runs a portfolio of in-person events for IT leaders, both in the United States and internationally. Its annual U.S. event, the CIO 100 Symposium & Awards, is a multi-day conference combining the CIO 100 Awards ceremony with programming on AI, cloud, and digital transformation. A related six-event regional series, CIO 100 Leadership Live, is held in U.S. cities such as Boston, Chicago, and New York, bringing together CIO 100 alumni and IT leaders for discussion.

Internationally, CIO ForwardTech is a recurring conference held in the United Kingdom and Germany focused on emerging technology trends for IT leaders, and CIO also runs a series of regional technology summits in South Korea covering cloud and AI strategy, AI infrastructure, and digital trust and cybersecurity.

== Awards received ==
CIO has received several industry awards for its own journalism and digital publishing, including from the American Society of Business Publication Editors (ASBPE). It was named the first winner of ASBPE's Digital Magazine of the Year in 2022, was named ASBPE's Website of the Year in 2010, and was a finalist for the same award in 2021.
