= Computer reservation system =

Computer reservation systems, or central reservation systems (CRS), are computerized systems used to store and retrieve information and conduct transactions related to air travel, hotels, car rental, or other activities. Originally designed and operated by airlines, CRSs were later extended for use by travel agencies, and global distribution systems (GDSs) to book and sell tickets for multiple airlines. Most airlines have outsourced their CRSs to GDS companies, which also enable consumer access through Internet gateways.

Modern GDSs typically also allow users to book hotel rooms, rental cars, airline tickets as well as other activities and tours. They also provide access to railway reservations and bus reservations in some markets, although these are not always integrated with the main system. These are also used to relay computerized information for users in the hotel industry, making reservation and ensuring that the hotel is not overbooked.

Airline reservations systems may be integrated into a larger passenger service system, which also includes an airline inventory system and a departure control system. The current centralised reservation systems are vulnerable to network-wide system disruptions.

== History ==
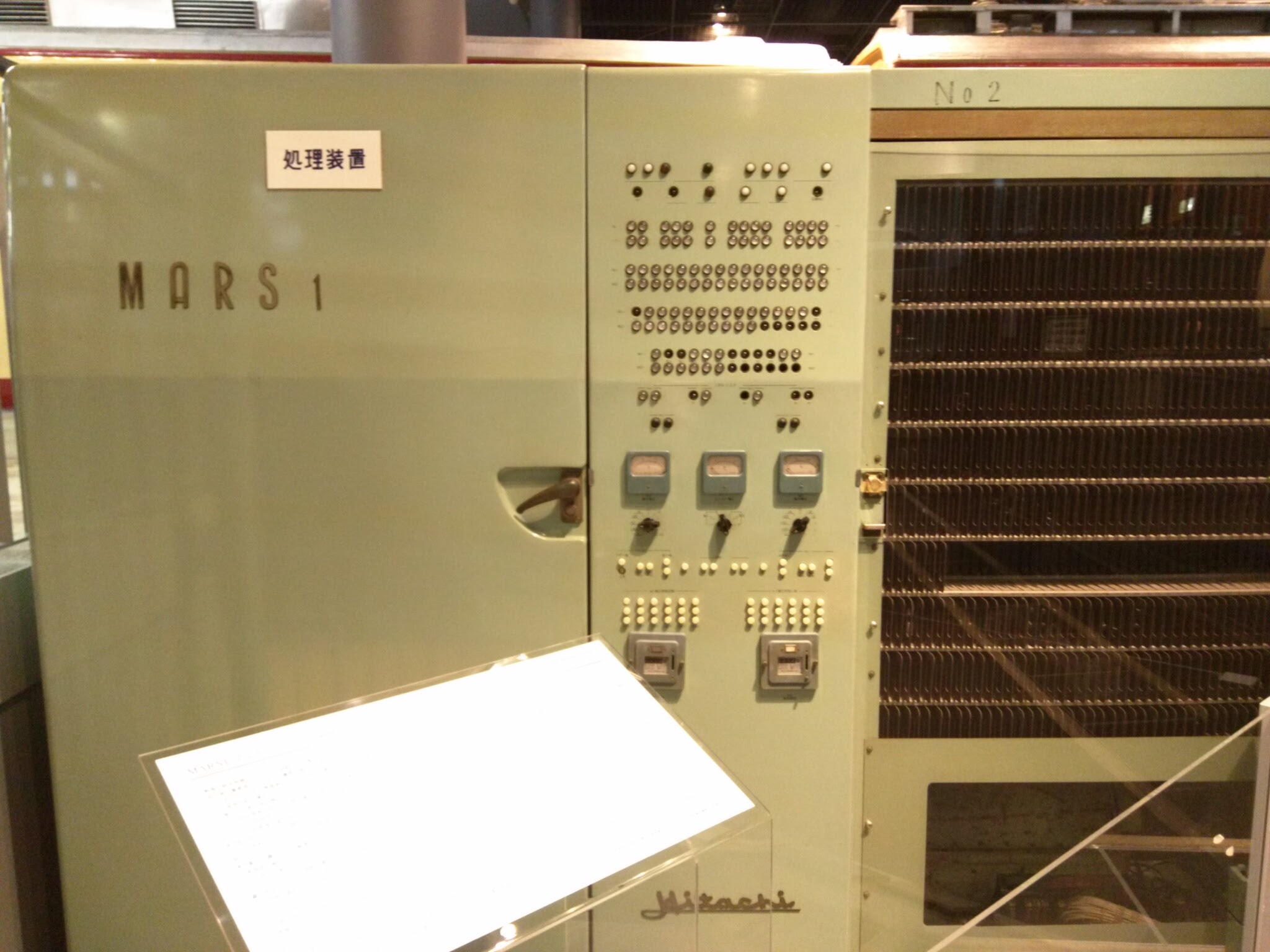
Preserved mainframe computer unit of the MARS-1 at the JR East Railway Museum in Saitama, September 2015.

=== MARS-1 ===
The MARS-1 train ticket reservation system was designed and planned in the 1950s by the Japanese National Railways' R&D Institute, now the Railway Technical Research Institute, with the system eventually being produced by Hitachi in 1958. It was the world's first seat reservation system for trains. The MARS-1 was capable of reserving seat positions, and was controlled by a transistor computer with a central processing unit and a 400,000-bit magnetic drum memory unit to hold seating files. It used many registers, to indicate whether seats in a train were vacant or reserved to accelerate searches of and updates to seat patterns, for communications with terminals, printing reservation notices, and CRT displays.

=== Remote access ===
In 1953 Trans-Canada Airlines (TCA) started investigating a computer-based system with remote terminals, testing one design on the University of Toronto's Ferranti Mark 1 machine that summer. Though successful, the researchers found that input and output was a major problem. Ferranti Canada became involved in the project and suggested a new system using punched cards and a transistorized computer in place of the unreliable tube-based Mark I. The resulting system, ReserVec, started operation in 1962, and took over all booking operations in January 1963. Terminals were placed in all of TCA's ticketing offices, allowing all queries and bookings to complete in about one second with no remote operators needed.

In 1953 American Airlines CEO C. R. Smith chanced to sit next to R. Blair Smith, a senior IBM sales representative, on a flight from Los Angeles to New York. C.R. invited Blair to visit their Reservisor system and look for ways that IBM could improve the system. Blair alerted Thomas Watson Jr. that American was interested in a major collaboration, and a series of low-level studies started. Their idea of an automated airline reservation system (ARS) resulted in a 1959 venture known as the Semi-Automatic Business Research Environment (SABRE), launched the following year. By the time SABRE was fully completed in December 1964, it was the world's first online transaction processing system, and at the time, "the world's largest private real time commercial data processing system".

Other airlines established their own systems. Pan Am launched its PANAMAC system in 1965 and Delta Air Lines launched DELTAMATIC in 1965, both of which had been developed by IBM alongside SABRE as part of the SABER joint project (and then American insisted on a different name for its project, resulting in the name SABRE). DELTAMATIC was followed by the Delta Automated Travel Account System (DATAS) in 1968.

In 1965, IBM generalized its work on the SABER joint project into Programmed Airline Reservation System (PARS), which became the industry standard by 1971. From 1971 to 1973, American migrated SABRE to a PARS-based system.

Soon, travel agents began pushing for a system that could automate their side of the process by accessing the various ARSes directly to make reservations. Fearful this would place too much power in the hands of agents, American Airlines executive Robert Crandall proposed creating an industry-wide computer reservation system to be a central clearing house for U.S. travel; other airlines demurred on the basis that this could violate United States antitrust law.

=== Travel agent access ===
In 1976, United Airlines began offering its Apollo system to travel agents; while it would not allow the agents to book tickets on United's competitors, the marketing value of the convenient terminal proved indispensable. SABRE, PARS, and DATAS were soon released to travel agents as well. Following airline deregulation in 1978, an efficient CRS proved particularly important; by some counts, Texas Air executive Frank Lorenzo purchased money-losing Eastern Air Lines specifically to gain control of its SystemOne CRS.

Also in 1976 Videcom international with British Airways, British Caledonian and CCL launched Travicom, the world's first multi-access reservations system (wholly based on Videcom technology), forming a network providing distribution for initially two and subsequently 49 subscribing international airlines (including British Airways, British Caledonian, Trans World Airlines, Pan Am, Qantas, Singapore Airlines, Air France, Lufthansa, Scandinavian Airlines System, Air Canada, KLM, Alitalia, Cathay Pacific and Japan Airlines) to thousands of travel agents in the UK. It allowed agents and airlines to communicate via a common distribution language and network, handling 97% of UK airline business trade bookings by 1987. The system went on to be replicated by Videcom in other areas of the world including the Middle East (DMARS), New Zealand, Kuwait (KMARS), Ireland, Caribbean, United States and Hong Kong. Travicom was a trading name for Travel Automation Services Ltd. When British Airways (who by then owned 100% of Travel Automation Services Ltd) chose to participate in the development of the Galileo system Travicom changed its trading name to Galileo UK and a migration process was put in place to move agencies from Travicom to Galileo.

European airlines also began to invest in the field in the 1980s initially by deploying their own reservation systems in their homeland, propelled by growth in demand for travel as well as technological advances which allowed GDSes to offer ever-increasing services and searching power. In 1987, a consortium led by Air France and West Germany's Lufthansa developed Amadeus, modeled on SystemOne. Amadeus Global Travel Distribution was launched in 1992. In 1990, Delta, Northwest Airlines, and Trans World Airlines formed Worldspan, and in 1993, another consortium (including British Airways, KLM, and United Airlines, among others) formed the competing company Galileo GDS based on Apollo. Numerous smaller companies such as KIU have also formed, aimed at niche markets not catered for by the four largest networks, including the low-cost carrier segment, and small and medium size domestic and regional airlines.

== Trends ==
At first, airlines' reservation systems preferred their owners' flights to others. By 1987, United States government regulations required SABRE and other American systems to be neutral, with airlines instead selling access to them for profit. European airlines' systems were still skewed toward their owners, but Flight International reported that they would inevitably become neutral as well.

For many years, global distribution systems (GDSs) have had a dominant position in the travel industry. To bypass the GDSs, and avoid high GDS fees, airlines have started to sell flights directly through their websites. Another way to bypass the GDSs is direct connection to travel agencies, such as that of American Airlines.

== Major airline CRS systems ==
Name	Created by	Airlines using	Also used by
AirCore	Unisys	GDS and other PSS systems, Low Cost Airlines, Full Services Carriers, Hybrid Airlines	Several large corporations
Abacus (purchased by Sabre in 2015)	All Nippon Airways; Cathay Pacific; China Airlines; EVA Airways; Garuda Indonesia; Malaysia Airlines; Philippine Airlines; Royal Brunei Airlines; SABRE; Singapore Airlines		Online travel agencies; Over 450 individual airlines; Over 25 countries in Asia Pacific; Over 80,000 hotels
ACCELaero	ISA, Information Systems Associates FZE	Air Arabia; Kam Air; Mahan Air; Zest Air; Over 14 airlines including low-cost carriers and full-service carriers	
Amadeus (1987)	Air France; Iberia Airlines; Lufthansa; Scandinavian Airlines System	All Nippon Airways; Aegean Airlines; Air India; Air Canada; Air Algérie; Air Astana; Air Caraïbes; Air Corsica; Air Côte d'Ivoire; Air Dolomiti; Air France; Air Greenland; Air Mauritius; Air Serbia; Air Tahiti Nui; Air Vanuatu; airBaltic; Aircalin; Asiana Airlines; Austrian Airlines; Avianca; Bangkok Airways; Binter Canarias; British Airways; Brussels Airlines; Bulgaria Air; Camair-Co; CapeAir; Cathay Pacific; China Airlines; Cimber Sterling; Corsair; Croatia Airlines; Czech Airlines; EgyptAir; El Al; Etihad Airways; EVA Airways; Fiji Airways; Finnair; Flybe; Garuda Indonesia; Hawaiian Airlines; Hunnu Air; Iberia; Icelandair; Japan Airlines; KLM; Kenya Airways; Korean Air; Kuwait Airways; LACSA; Libyan Airlines; LOT; Lufthansa; Malaysia Airlines; MIAT Mongolian Airlines; Middle East Airlines; OpenSkies; Philippine Airlines; Qantas; Qatar Airways; Rossiya; Royal Air Maroc; Royal Brunei Airlines; Royal Jordanian; Ukrainian International Airlines; S7 Airlines; Safi Airways; SATA Air Açores; SATA International; Saudia; Scandinavian Airlines; Seaport Airlines; Singapore Airlines; South African Airways; Southwest Airlines; SriLankan Airlines; Starlux Airlines; Swiss International Air Lines; TACA Airlines; TAM Airlines; TAM Mercosur; TAP Portugal; Thai Airways; Thai Smile; Thai Vietjet Air (soon); Toumaï Air Tchad; Trans Air Congo; Tunisair; Turkish; Twin Jet; VietJet Air (soon); Uni Air; Ural Airlines; Widerøe	144 Airline Passenger Service System customers through 60,000 airline sales offices worldwide; 90,000 travel agencies worldwide, both offline and online, in 195 countries. Online agencies include: Yatra.com; MakeMyTrip; Expedia; ebookers; CheapTickets; Opodo; Jetabroad; 440 bookable airlines (including over 60 Low Cost Carriers); Over 100,000 unique hotel properties; 30 Car rental companies representing over 36,000 car rental locations; 21 Cruise Lines; 203 Tour Operators; 103 Rail Operators; 23 Travel Insurance Companies
ameliaRES	InteliSys Aviation Systems	Over 40 low-cost carriers and regional airlines*; VietJet Air; Thai VietJet Air; Air Borealis; Air Liaison; Air Saint-Pierre; Air Timor; Bearskin Airlines; Calm Air; Central Mountain Air; Cronos Airlines; DAC Aviation International; Flair Airlines; Int'Air Iles; Lao Skyway; Pacific Coastal Airlines; PAL Airlines; Pascan Aviation; Perimeter Aviation; SKS Airways; SkyTrans Airlines; Surinam Airways; Tailwind Aviation; VI Air Link; Thai Platinum International Airlines; Vieques Air Link; Wasaya Airways LP; Wildcat Touring; Wilderness Seaplanes	
Avantik PSS	Bravo Passenger Solutions	Alliance Airlines; Aurginy; Bassaka Air; Cobham; Edelweiss Air; La Compagnie; Peach; People's; Sky Express; Susi Air; Tara Air; Tassili Airlines; Yeti Airlines	Online Travel Agencies
Axess		Japan Airlines	
Deltamatic (PSS)	Delta Air Lines	Delta Air Lines; Virgin Atlantic	
Crane	Hitit	Aero Contractors; Air Manas; Air Mediterranean; Air Namibia; Air Tuerk; APG Airlines; Arik Air; Bahamas Air; Chalair; Euro Airlines; Kamair; Nesma Airlines; Passion Air; Pakistan International Airlines; Pegasus Airlines; Precision Air; Turkmenistan Airlines; Nouvel Air; Air Tanzania; K2 Airlines; FlyArystan; Uganda Airlines; OneSky; Blue Stream; Libyan Wings; Sky Mali; Win Air; Animawings; Air Seychelles; Contour Airlines; Yemenia Airways; Nella Linhas Aeros; Mai Air; Air KBZ; Daallo; Cabo Verde; Royal Brunei Airlines	
Internet Booking Engine	Mercator	Qatar Airways; SriLankan Airlines; SAS Braathens	Over 3 individual airlines
KIU		Air Cuenca; EasyFly; Guinea Líneas Aéreas; LASER Airlines; LC Busre; Línea Aérea Amaszonas; MAYAir; SAEREO; Sol América; Star Perú; Tiara Air; Transportes Aéreos Cielos Andinos; ValueJet; Venezolana	Over 20 individual airlines; Over 10 countries in Latin America, North America, Africa and Europe; Travel agencies and wholesale tour operators worldwide
MARS	Railway Technical Research Institute; Hitachi		Japan Railways Group; Japanese travel agencies
Mercator	Emirates	Air Malawi; Air Tanzania; Air Zimbabwe; CTK – CiTylinK; Danube Wings; Emirates; Flydubai; InterSky; Merpati Nusantara Airlines; People's; Sky Work Airlines; Surinam Airways; Syrian Air; Yemenia; Zest Airways	
New Skies	Navitaire	AeroItalia; AirAsia; AirAsia Cambodia; AirAsia X; Air India Express; Air Premia; Akasa Air; Allegiant Air; Azul; Blue Air; Breeze Airways; Buzz; Cebu Pacific; Citilink; Eastar Jet; Eurowings; Eurowings Europe; Firefly; Flynas; FlyOne; FlyOne Armenia; Frontier Airlines; HK Express; IndiGo; Indonesia AirAsia; Jambojet; Jazeera Airways; Jeju Air; JetSmart; JetSmart Argentina; JetSmart Colombia; JetSmart Perú; Jetstar; Jetstar Asia; Jetstar Japan; JSX; Lauda Europe; Malta Air; Norse Atlantic Airways; Norse Atlantic UK; Philippines AirAsia; Pobeda; Porter Airlines; Ryanair; Ryanair UK; Scoot; SpiceJet; Spirit Airlines; Sun Country; Tigerair Taiwan; Transavia; Transavia France; TUI Airways; TUI fly Belgium; TUI fly Deutschland; TUI fly Netherlands; TUI fly Nordic; Thai AirAsia; Thai AirAsia X; Viva; Volaris; Volaris Costa Rica; Volaris El Salvador; Volotea; Vueling; Wizz Air; Wizz Air Abu Dhabi; Wizz Air Malta; Wizz Air UK	
PARS/SHARES by EDS		Air Nigeria; Braniff International Airways; COPA Airlines; Hawaii Island Air; United Airlines	
Patheo	Finnair; KLM; Lufthansa		Online travel agencies including; Airgorrila; American Express; Anyfares; Flights
Radixx		Aerocon; Africa World Airlines; Air India Express; Air Rarotonga; Air Transat; Air Turks & Caicos; Eznis; Federal Air; Flydubai; Freedom Air Guam; Great Lakes Aviation; Gryphon; JetUs; Lydd Air; Mokulele; Nature Air; Nok Air; Polynesian; Primera Air; Rotana Jet; Syphax Airlines; Transat Tours; Wingo	
Sabre (1960)	American Airlines	Aerolíneas Argentinas; Aeroméxico; Air Malta; Air New Zealand; Air Serbia; Alaska Airlines; American Airlines; Avior Airlines; Bahamasair; Bearskin Airlines; Canadian North; Central Mountain Air; COPA Airlines; Cyprus Airways; Ethiopian Airlines; First Air; Gol Linhas Aéreas Inteligentes; Gulf Air; JetBlue; LATAM Airlines; LATAM Ecuador; LATAM Perú; Oman Air; Pakistan International Airlines; RavnAir Group; SBA Airlines; TRIP Linhas Aéreas; Vietnam Airlines; Virgin Australia; WestJet	Online Travel Agencies: Travelocity; Lastminute.com; Travel Guru; Priceline; Schedules for 400 airlines; 380 airline industry customers, including 44 airlines representing all major alliances; 88,000 hotels; 50 rail carriers; 180 tour operators; 13 cruise lines; 24 car rental brands serving 30,000 locations; 9 limousine vendors providing access to more than 33,500 ground service providers; 55,000 travel agencies in over 100 countries
Sell-More-Seats		More than 55 scheduled carriers, charter carriers and low-cost carriers in Europe, Africa, Asia, Middle East and Central America	
SkyVantage Airline Software		ABM Air; Africa's Connection; Air Century; Air Unlimited; Branson AirExpress; Caicos Express Airlines; Caribbean Helicopters; Denver Air; One Caribbean; Pacificair; Sansa; Sky Bahamas; Sunshine Coast Air; Watermakers Air; Western Air	
Travel Technology Interactive	Travel Technology Interactive Group	Over 40 low-cost carriers, regional airlines and Legacy carriers of which; Air Antilles Express; Air KBZ; Europe Airpost; Ewa Air; Jubba Airways; Our Airline; Passaredo Linhas Aéreas; SATENA; Zanair	Travel agencies and wholesale tour operators worldwide
TravelSky		Air China; Air Macau; China Eastern Airlines; China Southern Airlines; Hainan Airlines; Hong Kong Airlines; Shandong Airlines; Shanghai Airlines; Sichuan Airlines; Air Manas	Online travel agencies including; Ctrip; eLong; mangocity
Travelport GDS Includes Apollo (1971), Galileo (1987) and Worldspan (1990)	Apollo: United Airlines.; Galileo: British Airways, KLM, Alitalia, Swissair, Austrian Airlines, Olympic Airways, Sabena, TAP Air Portugal, Aer Lingus.; Worldspan: Delta Air Lines, Northwest Airlines (Northwest Airlines merged with Delta Air Lines which uses Deltamatic), Trans World Airlines (merged with American Airlines which currently uses Sabre).		Zuji; BookIt.com; ebookers; Expedia; Flight Centre; Hotels; Hotwire; Orbitz; Priceline; Trailfinders; Webjet; Travel Agencies; Online Travel Services; Airlines; Corporations

== Other systems ==
- Polyot-Sirena

== See also ==
- Airline reservations system
- Overselling § Airlines
- Passenger name record
- Travel technology
- ARINC
- Rockwell Collins
- SITA (business services company)
