= Sabre Corporation =

American travel technology company

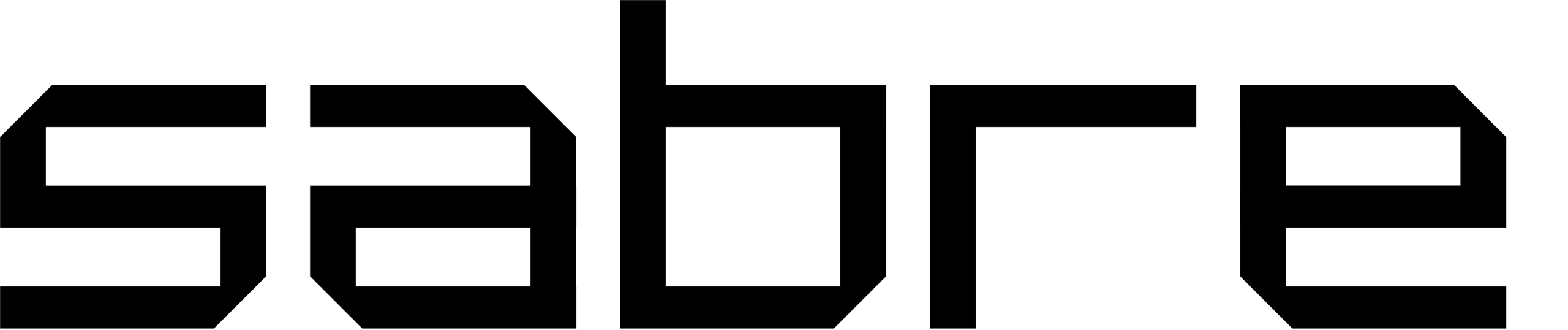
- Updated Logo from 2026
- Type: Public
- Traded as: Nasdaq: SABR; S&P 600 component; NYSE: TSG (2000-2007) S&P 500 component (2000-2007)
- ISIN: US78573M1045
- Industry: Travel
- Founded: 1960; 66 years ago
- Headquarters: Southlake, Texas, United States
- Key people: Gail Mandel (chair of the board); Kurt Ekert (CEO); Mike Randolfi (CFO)
- Products: Sabre Mosaic Marketplace, Sabre Mosaic airline technology platform, Sabre Global Distribution System
- Revenue: ▲US$2.771 billion (2025)
- Operating income: ▲US$0.295 billion (2025)
- Net income: ▲US$0.525 billion (2025)
- Total assets: ▼US$4.502 billion (2025)
- Total equity: ▲US$(1.036) billion (2025)
- Number of employees: ▼4,650 (2025)
- Website: sabre.com
- Footnotes; Financials as of December 31, 2025. References

Sabre Corporation, a travel technology company headquartered in Southlake, Texas, is the largest global distribution systems (GDS) provider for air bookings. The company's primary product, the Sabre Global Distribution System, and others like it, act as neutral intermediaries, connecting travel suppliers like airlines and hotels with travel sellers like agencies. They offer real-time availability and pricing, making them important for corporate travel management.

Founded by American Airlines in 1960, Sabre was spun off and became an independent company in 2000. In 2007, Texas Pacific Group and Silver Lake Partners acquired Sabre Holdings, the company's former name. Sabre then went public on the NASDAQ stock exchange in 2014.

Sabre's primary competitors are Amadeus IT Group, which operates the Amadeus CRS and Travelport, which operates the Galileo GDS.

== History ==
=== Early history ===
In 1953, C. R. Smith, the president of American Airlines, met Blair Smith, an IBM salesman, on a flight and developed the Sabre (the Semi-Automatic Business Research Environment) concept. The system was based on SAGE, the first major system to use interactive real-time computing, which IBM had developed for military use. Sabre Corporation was officially founded in 1960 by American Airlines. Sabre Corporation installed the first Sabre reservation system in Briarcliff Manor, New York that year. The system consisted of two IBM 7090 mainframe computers and processed 84,000 calls per day.

In 1964, Sabre's nationwide network was completed and became the largest commercial real-time data-processing system in the world. Sabre Corporation handled 7500 passenger reservations per hour in 1965. The Sabre system upgraded to IBM System/360 and moved to a new center in Tulsa, Oklahoma in 1972. In 1976, the Sabre system was installed into a travel agency for the first time. This allowed travel agents to have instant access to flights. By the end of the year, 130 locations installed the Sabre system. Sabre introduced BargainFinder, the industry's first automated low-fare search capability, in 1984. The following year, eAAsySabre was launched. eAAsySabre gave consumers with personal computers access to the Sabre system to make airline, hotel and car rental reservations.

By 1989, Sabre was reported as having "about 38 percent of the reservations market." In 1996, the company launched Travelocity, an online travel agency. Sabre formed a joint venture with Abacus International in 1998 to create SabreSonic, a customized version of Sabre's reservations system to Abacus subscribers in Asia.

=== 2000 to present ===
In 2000, Sabre Corporation was spun off of AMR Corporation to form an independent company. The following year, Electronic Data Systems (EDS) purchased Sabre Holdings' airline hardware and communications business, and Sabre began migrating its old mainframe for air travel shopping and pricing to HP NonStop and Linux servers. In 2005, the company acquired lastminute.com, an online travel and leisure retailer.

Sabre Corporation was acquired by Texas Pacific Group and Silver Lake Partners in March 2007. In March 2010, the company acquired Calidris, a revenue integrity and business intelligence company. Sabre Corporation acquired SoftHotel, a web-based property management provider, in June 2011. The company launched Sabre Red App Centre in March 2012. In April 2014, Sabre Corporation went public on NASDAQ under the ticker symbol SABR. The IPO sold for $16 per share and valued Sabre at $3.93 billion. The company acquired Genares, a hospitality technology company, that September.

In December 2014, Bravofly Rumbo Group acquired Sabre European Online Travel Agency, lastminute.com. In January 2015, Sabre sold its Travelocity brand to Expedia, Inc. for $280 million. In July 2015, Sabre acquired Abacus International, a global distribution system based in the Asia-Pacific region. The deal included long-term distribution agreements between Sabre and the 11 Asian airlines that previously shared ownership of Abacus. In June 2016, Sabre announced Tom Klein would resign as CEO by the end of 2016.

In October 2019 Sabre announced its purchase of Radixx for $110M. Radixx is a seller of passenger service software to small and budget airlines. Sabre expects Radixx to generate $20 million in 2019. In October 2021, Sabre announced the sale of the AirCentre portfolio to CAE Inc for $392.5M.

In May 2022 Sabre announced its purchase of Nuvola, a provider of hotel and service optimization software. In August 2022, it acquired Conferma Pay, a UK-based payments company. In March 2023, Sabre announced some executive changes as part of what it called its "long-term succession plan." The changes included Sean Menke transitioning to be sole Executive Chair effective April 27. At the same time, Kurt Ekert, who served as the president of Sabre, took over as CEO.

In 2025, Sabre entered into a multi-year $1.56 billion partnership with Coforge, an Indian IT company. It also sold its Hospitality Solutions division to TPG Inc.

In 2026, the company went through a rebranding. This consisted in a new logo along with a new color scheme, with orange replacing the classical red.

== Operations ==
The company is based in Southlake, Texas and has additional offices in London, Kraków, Bangalore, Montevideo and Singapore. As of 2024, Sabre connects travel agents to over 420 airlines including 150+ low-cost carriers, more than 2 million lodging options, 40+ car rental brands across 40,000 locations, and 30+ rail operators. Travel agents access this content via Sabre Mosaic Marketplace.

In addition to its agency platform, Sabre provides airline technology software under the Sabre Mosaic brand, covering retailing, offer management, revenue management, and passenger operations. The platform is designed to allow airlines to adopt modular capabilities without replacing existing systems.

== Acquisitions ==
- Preview Travel (2000)
- Dillion Communication Systems (2000)
- Gradient Solutions (2000)
- GetThere (2000)
- Sabre Pacific (2001)
- Nexion Inc. (2003)
- David R. Bornemann Associates (2001)
- Site59 (2001)
- Resfeber Scandinavia (2002)
- Kiehl Hendrickson Group (2002)
- axsResource Airport Resource Management Solutions (2003)
- World Choice Travel (2003)
- RM Rocade (2004)
- Showtickets.com (2004)
- SynXis Corporation (2004)
- Southwest Travel Systems (2005)
- IgoUgo.com (2005)
- Lastminute.com (2005)
- E-site Marketing (2007)
- Flight Explorer (2008)
- EB2 (2008)
- Calidris (2010)
- Flightline Data Services (2010)
- f:wz (2010)
- SoftHotel (2011)
- Prism (2012)
- Genares (2014)
- Abacus International (2015)
- Trust International (2015)
- Airpas Aviation (2016)
