= Airline consolidator =

Wholesaler of airline tickets

An airline consolidator is a wholesaler of airline tickets, sometimes described as a broker. Airlines make tickets available to consolidators at significant discounts and special conditions to those available to the general public. Consolidators seek to reach more niche markets, and are able to offer discounts and fare flexibility that is relevant to the target group.

Consolidators enter contracts with major carriers to sell at reduced prices to niche markets, the main benefit being that fares through consolidators will be lower than published rates available from the airlines themselves. Consolidators normally do not buy the seats in bulk for resale, they sell the available seats at contracted rates. Airlines normally preset the selling rates for these fares for sale to sub-agents and to end customers, thereby ensuring that the fares are not undercut.

Consolidators most commonly operate in international markets. In domestic markets, they typically only offer business class and first class tickets. Tickets purchased through consolidators may have very different fare rules than published fares, and sometimes frequent flyer credits may not accrue.

Even though many consolidators are online, most consolidators still work only through retail travel agents. Many consolidators also act as host agencies for local travel agencies. Many online travel agencies (OTAs) use consolidators to increase margins on sales since airlines do not pay commissions.

== See also ==
- Hotel consolidator
