= Worldspan =

Travel information and content provider

Worldspan is a provider of travel technology and content and a part of the Travelport GDS business. It offers worldwide electronic distribution of travel information, Internet products and connectivity, and e-commerce capabilities for travel agencies, travel service providers and corporations. Its primary system is commonly known as a Global Distribution System (GDS), which is used by travel agents and travel related websites to book airline tickets, hotel rooms, rental cars, tour packages and associated products. Worldspan also hosts IT services and product solutions for major airlines.

== Recent events ==
In December, 2006, Travelport, owner of the Galileo GDS, Gullivers Travel Associates (GTA) and a controlling share in Orbitz, agreed to acquire Worldspan. However, at the time, management of Travelport did not commit to the eventual merging of the two GDS systems, saying that they were considering all options, including running both systems in parallel. On August 21, 2007, the acquisition was completed for $1.4 billion and Worldspan became a part of Travelport GDS, which also includes Galileo and other related businesses. On September 28, 2008, the Galileo and Apollo GDS were moved from the Travelport datacenter in Denver, Colorado to the Worldspan datacenter in Atlanta, Georgia (although they continue to be run as separate systems from the Worldspan GDS).

In 2012, Worldspan customers were migrated from the TPF-based FareSource pricing engine to Travelport's Linux-based 360 Fares pricing engine already used by Galileo and Apollo. Although the three systems share a common pricing platform, they continue to operate as separate GDS.

== History ==
Worldspan was formed in early 1990 by Delta Air Lines, Northwest Airlines, and TWA to operate and sell its GDS services to travel agencies worldwide. Worldspan operated very effectively and profitably, successfully expanding its business in markets throughout North America, South America, Europe, and Asia. As a result, in mid-2003, Worldspan was sold by its owner airlines to Citigroup Venture Capital and Ontario Teachers' Pension Fund which in turn sold the business to Travelport in 2007.

Worldspan was formed in 1990 by combining the PARS partnerships companies (owned by TWA and Northwest Airlines, Inc.) and DATAS II, a division of Delta Air Lines, Inc. One of Worldspan’s predecessors – TWA PARS – became the first GDS to be installed in travel agencies in 1976. ABACUS, an Asian company owned by a number of Asian airlines, owned a small portion of Worldspan, and Worldspan owned a small portion of Abacus. Worldspan and Abacus entered into a series of business and technology relationships. These relationships were terminated after Abacus engaged in fraudulent and deceptive practices, for which Worldspan received a sizable judgement in an arbitration in London.

== See also ==
- Amadeus IT Group
- List of global distribution systems
- Passenger Name Record
- Code sharing
- Travel technology
