= Gryphon Airlines =

Airline of the United States

IATA	ICAO	Call sign
Y3	VOS	-
- Hubs: Kuwait International Airport
- Fleet size: 0
- Destinations: 0
- Parent company: Gryphon Holdings, LLC
- Headquarters: Vienna, Virginia, United States

Gryphon Airlines was an American-owned airline company with offices in Vienna, Virginia, United States. It was a subsidiary of Gryphon Holdings, LLC, a Delaware Limited Liability Company, which provided contract air services to various American airbases in the Middle East and South Central Asia. It initially operated as an indirect carrier utilizing ATR 72 aircraft from Swiftair SA of Madrid, Spain. A year later, Gryphon Holdings introduced DC-9 services to Baghdad with the support of Global Airways, a South African air charter company. A few months later, Gryphon acquired Rovos Air through TIM Holdings (PTY) LTD in South Africa permitting it to offer its own direct air services as Gryphon Airlines employing DC-9 and MD-82 aircraft. Gryphon became the first airline to offer scheduled flights to the military side of the Baghdad Airport, when these flights began in March 2007 from Kuwait. Gryphon provided air services to various US prime and subcontractors. Concurrent with the US 2012 draw down from Iraq, Gryphon concentrated its focus in support of Afghanistan from Dubai. Gryphon Airlines (Rovos Air) was sold to a South African company in 2014.

== Destinations ==
Gryphon Airlines operated the following services as of February 2010:

Afghanistan

- Kandahar - Kandahar International Airport
- Bagram - Bagram Airfield

Bosnia and Herzegovina

- Banja Luka - Banja Luka International Airport - charter
- Mostar - Mostar International Airport - charter
- Sarajevo - Sarajevo International Airport

Iraq

- Baghdad - Baghdad International Airport
- Najaf - Al Najaf International Airport

Kuwait

- Kuwait City - Kuwait International Airport

United Arab Emirates

- Dubai - Dubai International Airport
- Abu Dhabi - Abu Dhabi International Airport

== Fleet ==
The Gryphon Airlines fleet included the following aircraft in March 2011:

Safair fleet
Aircraft	In fleet	Notes
McDonnell Douglas DC-9-32	1	
McDonnell Douglas MD-82	1	
McDonnell Douglas MD-83	2	
Total	4	
