= Sabre (travel reservation system) =

Travel reservation system

Sabre Global Distribution System is a travel reservation system owned by Sabre Corporation, which allows travel agents and companies to search, price, book, and ticket travel services provided by airlines, hotels, car rental companies, rail providers and tour operators. Originally developed by American Airlines under CEO C. R. Smith with the assistance of IBM in 1960, the booking service became available for use by external travel agents in 1976 and became independent of the airline in March 2000.

== Overview ==
The system's parent company is organized into three business units:

- Sabre Travel Network: global distribution system
- Sabre Airline Solutions: airline technology
- Sabre Hospitality Solutions: hotel technology solutions

Sabre is headquartered in Southlake, Texas, and has many employees in various locations around the world.

== History ==
The name of the computer reservation system is an abbreviation for "Semi-Automated Business Research Environment", and was originally styled in all-capital letters as SABRE. It was developed to automate the way American Airlines booked reservations.

=== Manual airline reservations: Sell and report ===
In the 1950s, American Airlines was facing a serious challenge in its ability to quickly handle airline reservations in an era that witnessed high growth in passenger volumes in the airline industry. Before the introduction of SABRE, the airline's system for booking flights was almost entirely manual, like all other airlines at the time.

During the 1930s, most airlines in that period used a request and reply system in which seat inventory was controlled from the departure city. A sales agent would call in a proposed reservation to a departure management agent or booking agent stationed in the departure city. In this manual system, a team of eight operators would sort through a rotating file with cards for all upcoming scheduled flights from the departure city. When a seat was booked, the operator would locate the corresponding flight card, mark the booked seat, and manually write out the flight ticket. The entire end-to-end task of looking for a flight, marking a seat as reserved, and writing up the flight ticket took approximately 90 minutes on average. The system also had limited room to scale. It was limited to eight operators because that was the maximum that could fit around the rotating file.

In 1939, American Airlines switched its reservation system from request and reply to sell and report. Agents in the airline's Boston office discovered that it was much faster and more efficient to simply allow all sales agents to get away with freely selling seats and then later reporting to the departure city what they had done. At a certain threshold, when the flight was nearly full, a "stop sale" message was sent to all locations and then sales agents would return to the request and reply system to fill the remaining seats on the flight. But this was still a manual system. It also meant, of course, that sometimes a booking agent would have to inform a sales agent that the flight was already full (if the remaining seats had sold out too quickly before all sales agents received the "stop sale" message) and then the sales agent would have to try to rebook the passenger on another flight.

By 1952, American had already started to introduce the new Magnetronic Reservisor, an electromechanical computer, to automate its sell and report reservation process. This computer consisted of a single magnetic drum, in which each memory location held the number of seats left on a particular flight. Using this system, a large number of operators could access information simultaneously, so a booking agent could tell a sales agent immediately via phone if a seat was available. But the downside was that a human agent was still needed at each end of the phone line, and actually recording and issuing the ticket still required considerable manual effort by the booking agent. Something much more highly automated was needed if American Airlines was going to enter the jet age, booking many times more seats on larger jet airliners.

=== 1953 IBM-American meeting ===
During the testing phase of the Reservisor, a high-ranking IBM salesman, Blair Smith, was flying on an American Airlines flight from Los Angeles back to IBM in New York City in 1953. He found himself sitting next to American Airlines president C. R. Smith. Noting that they shared a common family name, they began talking. According to Blair Smith, after they discussed the idea of a computer that could keep track of not just seat availability but an passenger's entire reservation, C.R. Smith told him that when he was done with his training at IBM, he should visit American's reservation center at LaGuardia Airport, then write a letter to American recommending what to do. During his training session in New York, Blair Smith updated Thomas J. Watson Jr. on his encounter with C.R. Smith. In response, Watson stressed the importance of touring the reservation center as requested, preparing a recommendation letter, and sharing a copy with Watson himself.

IBM was working with the United States Air Force on their Semi-Automatic Ground Environment (SAGE) project. SAGE used a series of large computers to coordinate the message flow from radar sites to interceptors, dramatically reducing the time needed to direct an attack on an incoming bomber. The system used teleprinter machines located around the world to feed information into the system, which then sent orders back to teleprinters located at the fighter bases. It was one of the first online systems.

Smith and Watson observed that the SAGE system's basic architecture was suitable for use in American Airlines' booking services. Teleprinters would be placed at American Airlines' ticketing offices to send in requests and receive responses directly, without the need for anyone on the other end of the phone. The number of available seats on the aircraft could be tracked automatically, and if a seat was available the ticket agent could be notified. Booking simply took one more command, updating the availability and, if desired, could be followed by printing a ticket.

Thirty days after the two Smiths' fateful encounter, IBM sent a research proposal to American Airlines, suggesting that they join forces to study the problem. A team was set up consisting of IBM engineers led by John Siegfried and a large number of American Airlines' staff led by Malcolm Perry, taken from booking, reservations, and ticket sales.

=== Development of SABRE ===
A formal development arrangement was signed in 1957. The first experimental system went online in 1960.

While IBM and American worked on their ambitious joint research project, Sperry Rand beat IBM to market with a computer reservations system in 1958: the UNIVAC Air Lines Reservations System. The UNIVAC system, built for Eastern Air Lines, could only track seat inventory in real time but not the entire passenger reservation. The agent still had to prepare a separate passenger ticket, both manually written and as a manually keypunched card, for later reconciliation with a computer punched card generated when that seat was reserved and withdrawn from inventory.

IBM entered into talks with other airlines while working with American, and signed contracts by 1960 to develop similar projects for Pan Am and Delta Air Lines. IBM created the internal code name SABER for its joint project to develop three slightly different airline reservations systems. American then sought a different name for its system, which became the Semi-Automated Business Research Environment, or SABRE. IBM made a serious error by implementing the three systems on three incompatible mainframe computers: DELTAMATIC ran on the IBM 7070, PANAMAC ran on the IBM 7080, and SABRE ran on the IBM 7090. In retrospect, it would have made more sense to implement all three on the IBM 7090.

In the early 1960s, software development was still in its infancy. Transforming a small experiment into an reliable, high-performance system was much harder than IBM or American had anticipated in 1953. The IBM programmers working on SABRE at Briarcliff Manor, New York could see the prisoners in the exercise yard at the nearby Sing Sing state prison, and by 1962 they were wryly joking that the difference between us and them is that the prisoners know when they will be getting out. After significant cost overruns and delays, SABRE was finally launched in 1964, as the world's first fully operational computer reservations system. It was also the world's first online transaction processing system, and at the time, "the world's largest private real time commercial data processing system". A year later, in 1965, IBM also finished and launched DELTAMATIC and PANAMAC.

The original SABRE system ran on two IBM 7090 computers in a "state-of-the-art data center" in Briarcliff Manor. One was for real-time processing and the other was there as a backup and to handle batch jobs. American Airlines agents interacted with SABRE through computer terminals manufactured by Raytheon. SABRE could handle 7,500 reservations per hour. After it became fully operational, the average time to make an reservation with American Airlines dropped from 90 minutes to a few seconds.

=== Migration to PARS ===
IBM generalized its knowledge of how to automate airline reservations into PARS (Programmed Airline Reservation System). PARS ran on models 40 through 75 of the newer IBM System/360 mainframe family, though Model 65 was the most popular one for airlines. The operating system component of PARS evolved into ACP (Airlines Control Program), and later in 1979 became TPF (Transaction Processing Facility).

By 1971, PARS was the industry standard. In 1971, United Airlines gave up on its earlier experiments with UNIVAC and deployed Apollo, a PARS-based system. From 1971 to 1973, American migrated SABRE to a PARS-based system running on System/360 mainframes. This decision meant that by 1971, nine of the top ten U.S. major airlines were using PARS.

As part of the migration, the SABRE data center was moved from New York to a new underground location in Tulsa, Oklahoma. Max Hopper joined American Airlines in 1972 as director of SABRE, and pioneered its broader deployment beyond American Airlines itself. SABRE was expanded to allow direct access by travel agents in 1976.

=== Independence from American Airlines ===
By the mid-1980s SABRE was the dominant system in the United States, processing 45% of all airline reservations. 50,000 travel agents in the nation used SABRE. SABRE offered airline reservations through the CompuServe Information Service, Prodigy, and General Electric's GEnie under the Eaasy SABRE brand. This service was extended to America Online (AOL) in the 1990s.

American and Sabre separated on March 15, 2000. Sabre had been a publicly traded corporation, Sabre Holdings, stock symbol TSG on the New York Stock Exchange until taken private in March 2007. The corporation introduced the new logo and changed from the all-caps acronym "SABRE" to the mixed-case "Sabre Holdings". The Travelocity website, introduced in 1996, was owned by Sabre Holdings. Travelocity was acquired by Expedia in January 2015. Sabre Holdings' three remaining business units, Sabre Travel Network, Sabre Airline Solutions and Sabre Hospitality, today collectively operate as a global travel technology company.

== Controversy ==
A 1982 study by American Airlines found that travel agents selected the flight appearing on the first line more than half the time. Ninety-two percent of the time, the selected flight was on the first screen. This provided a huge incentive for American to manipulate its ranking formula, or even corrupt the search algorithm outright, to favor American flights over its competitors in the results of flight search results, and the airline did not resist the temptation.

At first this was limited to juggling the relative importance of factors such as the length of the flight, how close the actual departure time was to the desired time, and whether the flight had a connection, but with each success American became bolder. In late 1981, New York Air added a flight from La Guardia to Detroit, challenging American in an important market. Before long, the new flights suddenly started appearing at the bottom of the screen. Its reservations dried up, and it was forced to cut back from eight Detroit flights a day to none.

On one occasion, Sabre deliberately withheld Continental's discount fares on 49 routes where American competed. A Sabre staffer had been directed to work on a program that would automatically suppress any discount fares loaded into the system.

Congress investigated these practices, and in 1983 Bob Crandall, president of American, vocally defended the airline's preferential treatment of its own offerings in the system. "The preferential display of our flights, and the corresponding increase in our market share, is the competitive raison d'être for having created the system in the first place," he told them. The U.S. government disagreed, and in 1984 it outlawed the biasing practices for the search results at SABRE, and United and TWA's own systems.

Allegations of bias continued. In 1985 the United States Department of Justice accused American and United's systems of a second screen favoring the airline that owned the system; American and United agreed to stop the practice. In 1986, Delta complained to the United States Department of Transportation that American provided to SABRE flight schedules with shorter flight times than in reality, to cause the system to display American flights first.

By 1987, Flight International said, because of Department of Transportation regulations, SABRE and other such systems in the US "are about as close to neutrality as a system could reasonably be expected to get". No longer able to use them against rivals, airlines now sold access to reservation systems for profit. The fairness rules were eliminated or allowed to expire in 2010. By then, none of the major distribution systems was majority owned by the airlines.

As of 1987 European airlines' reservations systems were still skewed toward their owners. In 1987 Sabre's success of selling to European travel agents was inhibited by the refusal of big European carriers led by British Airways to grant the system ticketing authority for their flights even though Sabre had obtained IATA Billing and Settlement Plan (BSP) clearance for the UK in 1986. American brought High Court action which alleged that after the arrival of Sabre on its doorstep British Airways immediately offered financial incentives to travel agents who continued to use Travicom and would tie any override commissions to it. Travicom was created by Videcom, British Airways and British Caledonian and launched in 1976 as the world's first multi-access reservations system based on Videcom technology which eventually became part of Galileo UK. It connected 49 subscribing international airlines (including British Airways, British Caledonian, TWA, Pan American World Airways, Qantas, Singapore Airlines, Air France, Lufthansa, SAS, Air Canada, KLM, Alitalia, Cathay Pacific and JAL) to thousands of travel agents in the UK. It allowed agents and airlines to communicate via a common distribution language and network, handling 97% of UK airline business trade bookings by 1987.

British Airways eventually bought out the stakes in Travicom held by Videcom and British Caledonian, to become the sole owner. Although Sabre's vice-president in London, David Schwarte, made representations to the U.S. Department of Transportation and the British Monopolies Commission, British Airways defended the use of Travicom as a truly non-discriminatory system in flight selection because an agent had access to some 50 carriers worldwide, including Sabre, for flight information.

== See also ==
- Travelocity
- List of global distribution systems
- Passenger name record
- Code sharing
- Electronic Recording Machine, Accounting (ERMA) – another pioneering early system. ERMA, SAGE and SABRE helped legitimize computers in business.
- Real-time operating system – SABRE was one of the first such systems
- Perry O. Crawford Jr.
- Travel technology
- Galileo CRS
- Navitaire
- Travelport
- Amadeus
