= Galileo GDS =

Computer reservations system

Galileo is a computer reservations system (CRS) owned by Travelport. As of 2000, it had a 26.4% share of worldwide CRS airline bookings. In addition to airline reservations, the Galileo CRS is also used to book train travel, cruises, car rental, and hotel rooms.

The system was originally known as Apollo, launched in 1971 by United Airlines as their in-house booking system. In 1976, UA began installing Apollo terminals in travel agent offices. Apollo, and the competing American Airlines system Sabre, quickly took over much of the booking market. In response to possible government intervention due to antitrust concerns, UA spun off the system to become its own company in 1992, Covia. That same year, Covia purchased a competitor, Galileo, which had been created by a consortium of European airlines. They merged operatations under the Galileo name. UA remained major customers for Galileo until 2012, when they introduced a new in-house booking system, SHARES.

Galileo was later acquired by Travelport, which also purchased the competing Worldspan in 2007. Galileo became one of the three global distribution system platforms operated by Travelport, alongside Apollo and Worldspan. On 28 September 2008, Galileo system was moved from Denver, Colorado, to the Worldspan datacenter in Atlanta, Georgia. Although they now share the same datacenter, they continue to be run as separate systems. Galileo is subject to the Capps II and its successor Secure Flight program for the selection of passengers with a risk profile. Galileo is a member of the International Air Transport Association, of the OpenTravel Alliance and of SITA.

== History ==
Galileo traces its roots back to 1971 when United Airlines created its first computerized central reservation system under the name Apollo. During the 1980s and early 1990s, a significant proportion of airline tickets were sold by travel agents. Flights by the airline owning the reservation system had preferential display on the computer screen. Due to the high market penetration of the Sabre and Apollo systems, owned by American Airlines and United Airlines, respectively, Worldspan and Galileo were created by other airline groups in an attempt to gain market share in the computer reservation system market and, by inference, the commercial airline market. Galileo was formed in 1987 by nine European carriers -- British Airways, KLM Royal Dutch Airlines, Alitalia, Swissair, Austrian Airlines, Olympic, Sabena, Air Portugal and Aer Lingus.

In response to regulatory concerns and to avoid possible government intervention, United Airlines spun off its Apollo reservation system, which was then controlled by Covia. Galileo International was formed when Covia acquired Europe's Galileo and merged it with the Apollo system in 1992.

The Apollo reservation system was used by United Airlines until 3 March 2012, when it switched to SHARES, a system used by its former Continental Airlines subsidiary. Apollo is still used by Galileo International (now part of Travelport GDS) travel agency customers in the United States, Canada, Mexico, and Japan.

Galileo UK was originally created from Travicom, which was the world's first multi-access reservations system using the technology developed by Videcom. Travicom was launched by Videcom, British Airways, British Caledonian, and CCL in 1976, and in 1988 it became Galileo UK.

=== Developments ===
Travel agents also book Amtrak rail services on the system and issue tickets directly.

Southwest Airlines has entered into a marketing agreement with Apollo/Galileo, and travel agents are now able to book reservations on Southwest. These direct connects offer the possibility to sell ancillary services and to differentiate oneself from the competition.

The development team at Travelport has also developed an online search tool called ASK Travelport, where registered users can find answers to frequently asked questions and queries.

== See also ==
- Codeshare agreement
- Passenger Name Record
