= Travelport =

Smallest, by revenue, of the top three global distribution systems

Travelport Worldwide Ltd.
- Type: Private
- Industry: Travel
- Founded: 2001; 25 years ago
- Headquarters: Langley, Berkshire, UK
- Key people: John Mangelaars (CEO); John Swainson (executive chairman); Andrew Jordan (CPTO); Nick Bray (CFO)
- Revenue: US$1.5 billion (2025)
- Owner: Elliott Management & Davidson Kempner
- Number of employees: 2,000 (2026)
- Website: www.travelport.com

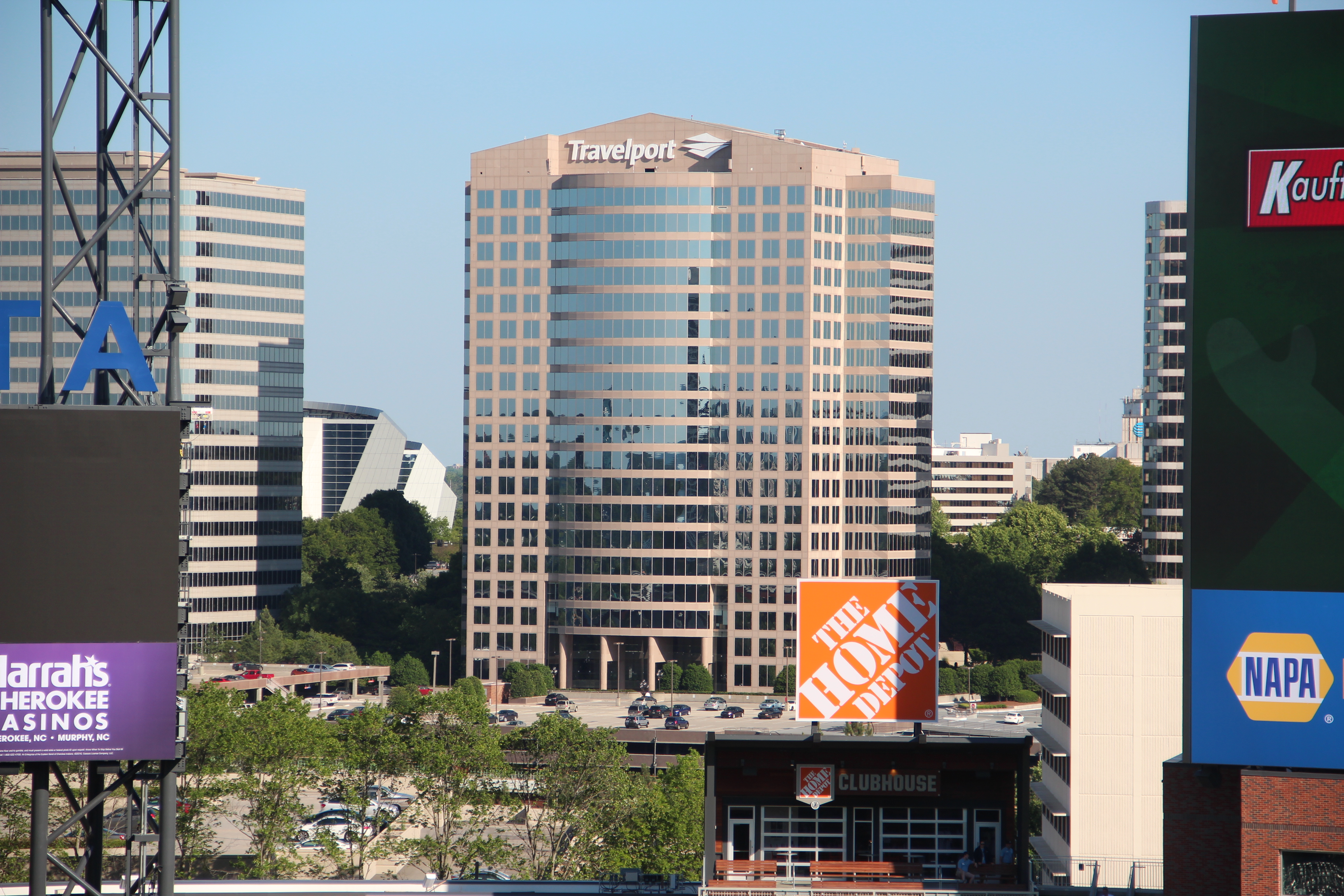
Travelport offices in Cumberland, Georgia

Travelport Worldwide Ltd. provides distribution, technology, and payment solutions for the travel and tourism industry. It is the smallest, by revenue, of the top three global distribution systems (GDS) after Amadeus IT Group and Sabre Corporation.

The company also provides IT services to airlines, such as shopping, ticketing, and departure control.

== History ==
The company was formed by Cendant in 2001 following its acquisitions of Galileo GDS for $2.9 billion and CheapTickets for $425 million.

In 2004, the company acquired Orbitz for $1.25 billion and Flairview Travel for $88 million.

In 2005, the company acquired eBookers for $350 million and Gullivers Travel Associates for $1.1 billion.

In August 2006, Cendant sold Orbitz and Galileo to The Blackstone Group for $4.3 billion, forming Travelport.

In August 2007, Travelport acquired Worldspan for $1.4 billion.

In July 2007, the company completed the partial corporate spin-off of Orbitz via an initial public offering.

In May 2010, the company acquired Sprice.com.

In 2011, the company sold Gullivers Travel Associates to Kuoni Travel for $720 million.

On September 25, 2014, the company became a public company via an initial public offering on the New York Stock Exchange.

In 2015, Travelport acquired Mobile Travel Technologies for €55 million.

On March 10, 2023, the company acquired Deem from Enterprise Holdings for an undisclosed amount.

== Awards ==
In 2017, Travelport was the first GDS to be awarded the International Air Transport Association NDC (New Distribution Capability) Level 3 certification as an aggregator of travel content. In 2018, it became the first GDS operator to manage the live booking of flights using the NDC standard.

== Acquisition ==
On May 30, 2019, the company was acquired by affiliates of Siris Capital Group and Evergreen Coast Capital, an affiliate of Elliott Management Corporation, for $4.4 billion.
