= Travel agency =

Retailer that provides tourism-related services

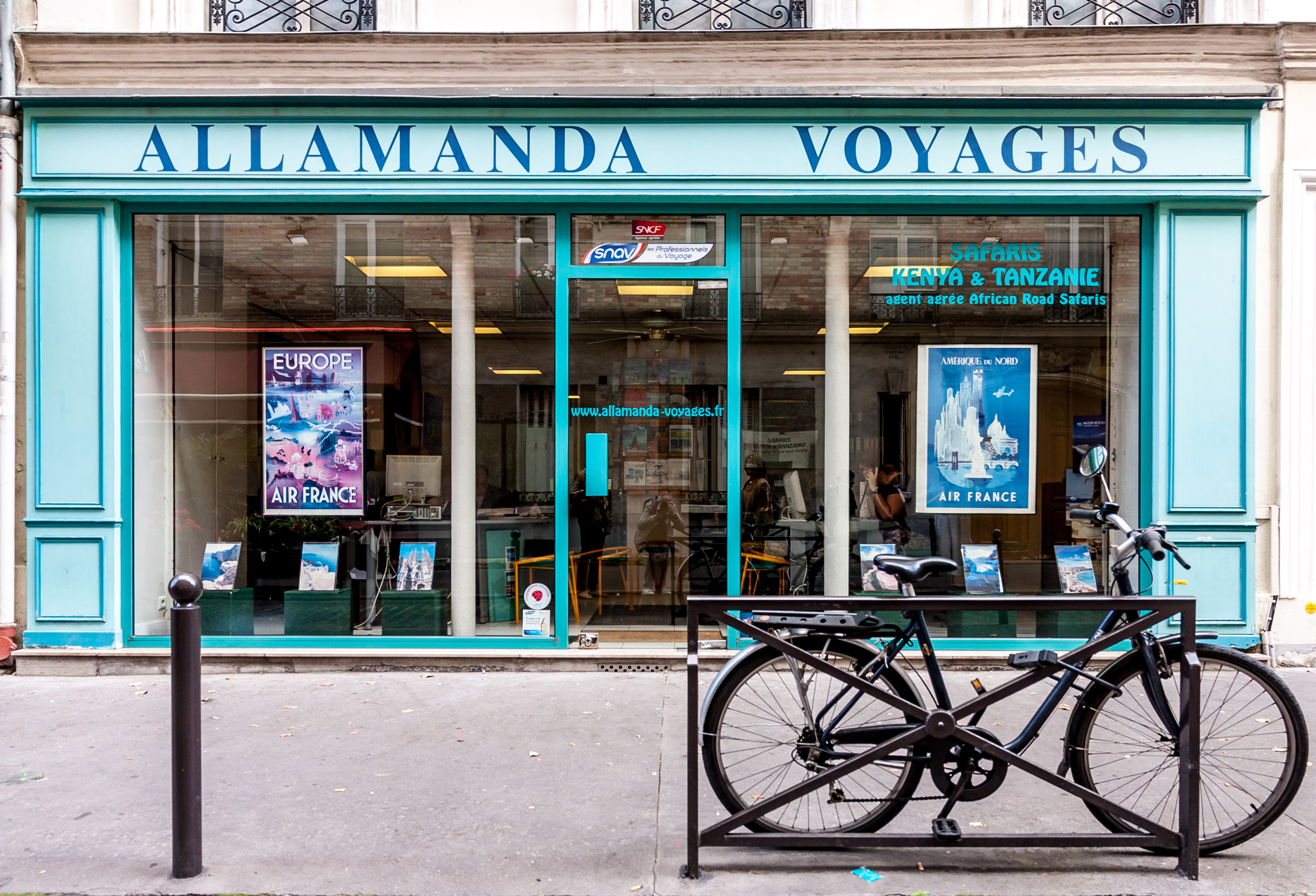
Allamanda Voyages travel agency in Paris

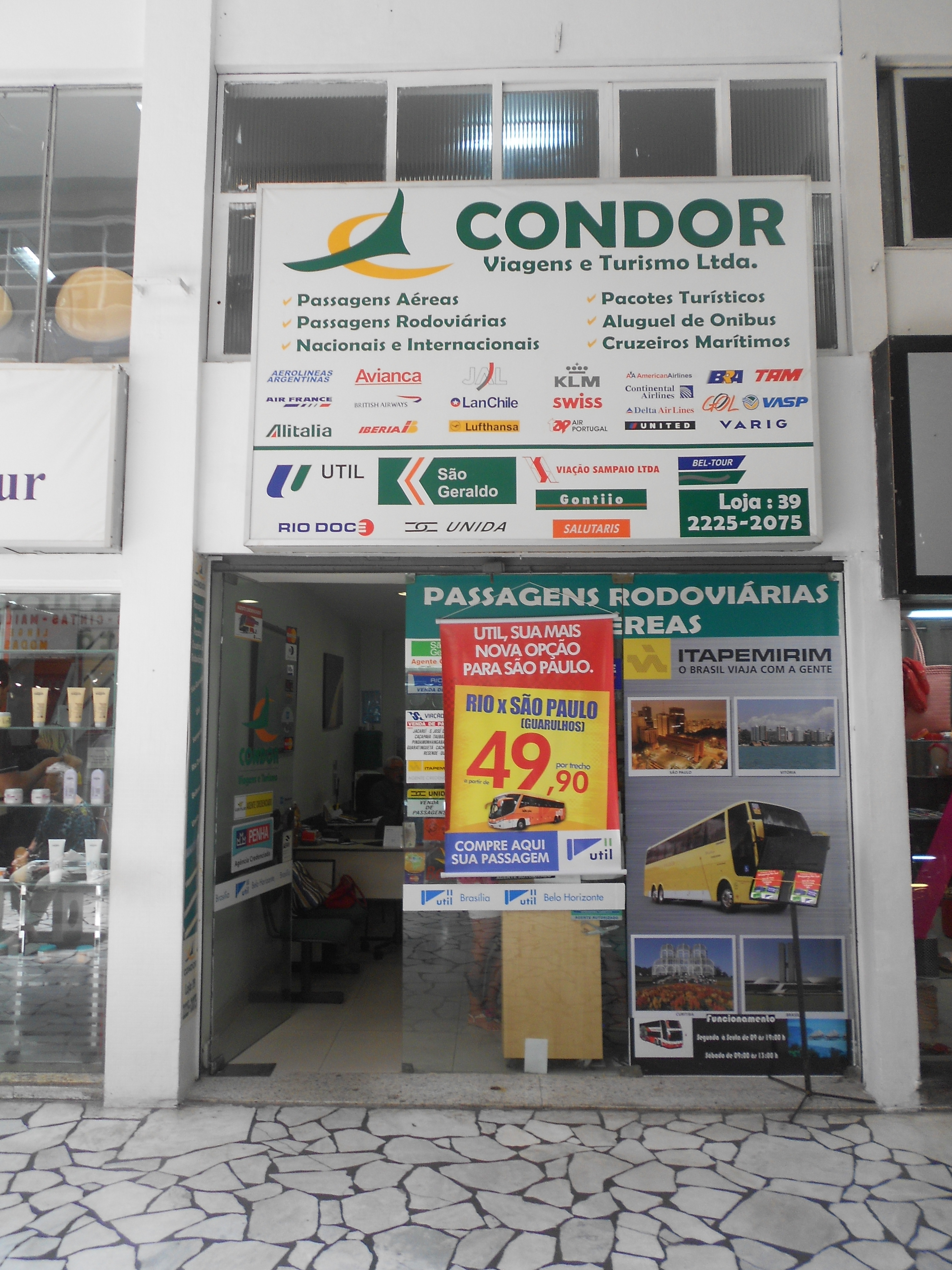
Travel agency in Rio de Janeiro, Brazil

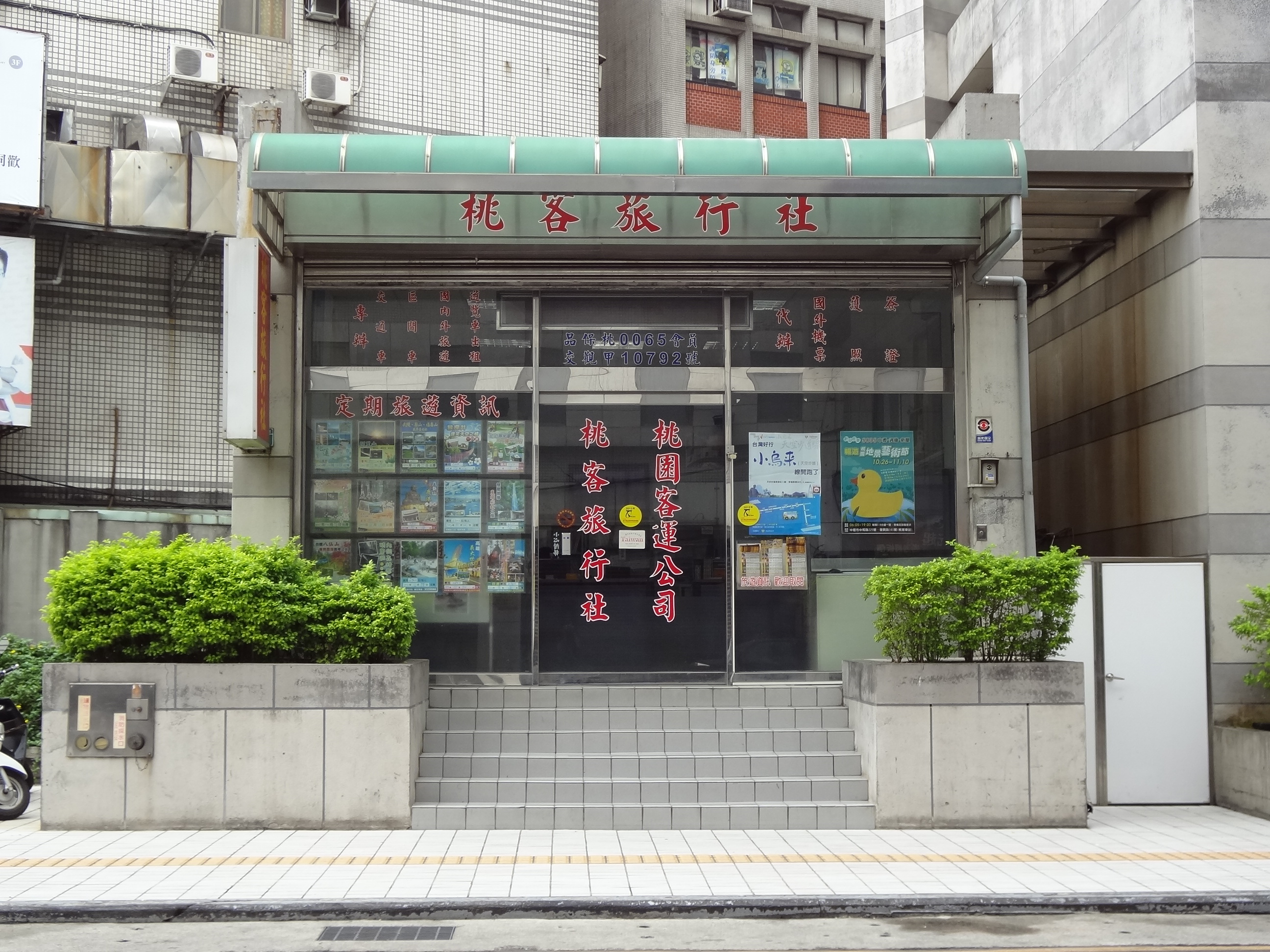
Travel agency in Taiwan

A travel agency is a private retailer or public service that provides travel and tourism-related services to the general public on behalf of accommodation or travel suppliers to offer different kinds of travel packages for each destination.

Travel agencies can provide outdoor recreation, arranging logistics for luggage and medical items delivery for travellers upon request, public transport timetables, car rentals, and bureau de change services. Travel agencies can also serve as general sales agents for airlines that do not have offices in a specific region. A travel agency's main function is to act as an agent, selling travel products and services on behalf of a supplier. They are also called Travel Advisors. They do not keep inventory in-hand unless they have pre-booked hotel rooms or cabins on a cruise ship for a group travel event, such as a wedding, honeymoon, or other group event.

In the decades after World War II, travel and migration agencies also played a role in assisting international migration, alongside state programmes and intergovernmental organisations such as the Intergovernmental Committee for European Migration (ICEM, now the International Organization for Migration.).

== Business model ==
Travel agencies often receive commissions and other benefits and incentives from providers or may charge a fee to the end users. Hotel owners and tour operators typically pay a higher commission rate to travel agencies, whereas airlines typically pay no commission. The customer is normally not made aware of how much the travel agent is earning in commissions and other benefits. A 2016 survey of 1,193 travel agents in the United States found that on average 78% of their revenue was from commissions and 22% was generated from fees.

== Accreditation number ==
Travel agencies are recognized by vendors through their accreditation numbers. In the United States, the main accreditation numbers are issued by Airlines Reporting Corporation, Cruise Lines International Association, International Air Transport Association.

If more than one travel agency is booking under the same accreditation number, the agency of record is called a host agency. This is a popular model in the United States, with surveys show anywhere from 43-85% of leisure agencies now booking under a host agency.

== Travel technology ==
Travel agencies use the services of the major computer reservations systems, also known as global distribution systems (GDS), including: Amadeus CRS, Galileo GDS, Sabre, and Worldspan, which is a subsidiary of Travelport, which allow for comparison and sorting of hotel and flight rates with multiple companies. Bookings made via travel agents, including online travel agents, may or may not be confirmed instantly. Unlike online travel agencies, metasearch engines and scraper sites, such as Skyscanner, Kayak.com, Rome2rio, and TripAdvisor, travel agencies may or may not have their own booking engine, and instead provide results for search queries and then divert traffic to service providers or online travel agencies for booking. Travel agents may also work with airline consolidators.

Some companies use technology to promote sustainable tourism and bring carbon-neutrality.

== Types of travel agencies ==
=== Traditional travel agencies ===
A traditional travel agent may work for a travel agency or work freelance. Many traditional agents prefer the term "travel advisor" as opposed to "travel agent" to emphasize their advice, expertise, and connections that are of great value. While most point-to-point travel is now booked online, traditional agents specialize in niche markets such as corporate travel, luxury travel, cruises, complicated and important trips, and specialty trips. Other niche markets for traditional travel agencies include travelers with disabilities, travelers over the age of 60, women traveling alone, LGBT tourism, or a particular group interested in a similar activity, such as a sport.

=== Franchise travel agencies ===
Helloworld Travel is an example of a franchised travel agency, giving agents access to internal systems for product and bookings.

=== Online travel agencies ===
An online travel agency (OTA) uses a platform business model to generate revenue. The Expedia Group is the largest OTA globally. Booking Holdings is the second largest OTA.Research has documented that OTA dominance creates structural information asymmetry for independent hotels: OTAs observe the full decision surface of each booking while hotels receive only reservation outcomes, a dynamic that compounds over time as commission payments fund increasingly precise OTA models of hotel pricing vulnerability.

== Licensing ==
In many countries, travel agencies that wish to issue airline tickets directly can obtain accreditation from the International Air Transport Association (IATA). Many are also bonded and represented by IATA, and, for those that issue air tickets, the Air Travel Organisers' Licensing (ATOL) in the United Kingdom, and the Airlines Reporting Corporation in the United States also serve those purposes. ABTA – The Travel Association the Association of Canadian Travel Agencies (ACTA) The American Society of Travel Advisors (ASTA), represent travel agencies in the United Kingdom, Canada, and the United States respectively.

== History ==
In 1758, Cox & Kings became the first travel agency in modern history.

In 1840, the Abreu Agency was established in Porto by Bernardo Abreu, becoming the world's first agency to open its services to the public.

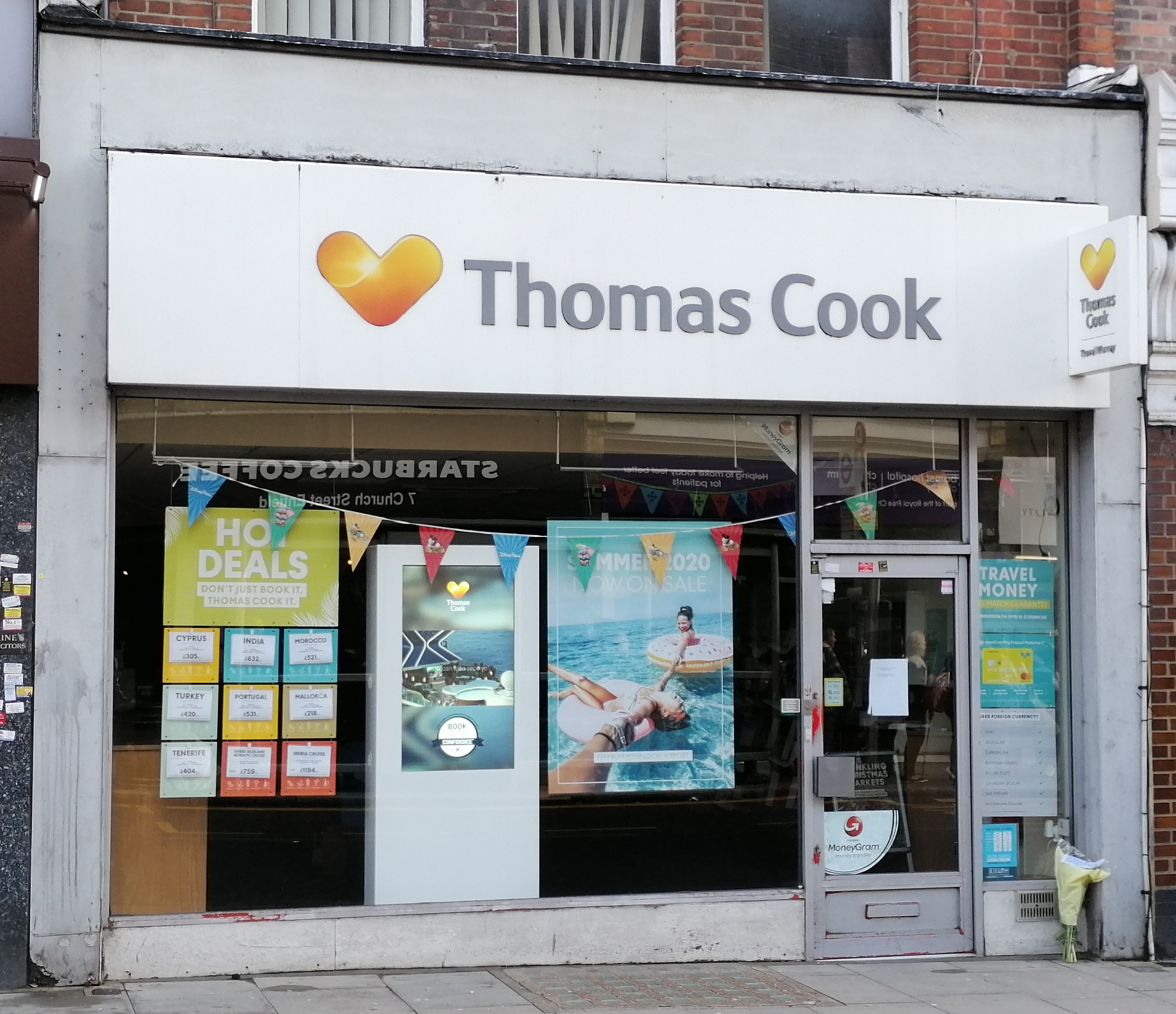
A Thomas Cook travel agency in the United Kingdom, which ceased operating in 2019.

In 1841, Thomas Cook, a Baptist preacher who believed that alcohol was to blame for social problems, reached an agreement with the Midland Railway to organize the transportation of 500 members of his temperance movement from the Leicester Campbell Street railway station to a rally in Loughborough in exchange for a commission. He formed Thomas Cook & Son, which later became The Thomas Cook Group. It filed bankruptcy and underwent liquidation in 2019.

In 1871, Dean and Dawson was founded in the United Kingdom and in the 1950s, it was acquired by Thomas Cook.

In 1870, the Polytechnic Touring Association was founded in the United Kingdom.

In 1887, Walter T. Brownell established Brownell Travel, the first travel agency in the United States, and led 10 travelers on a European tour setting sail from New York on the SS Devonia.

In 1895, Baldwins Travel was founded by Alfred K Baldwin, originally a printer, bookbinder and publisher in Tunbridge Wells. Baldwins begins selling railway tickets and helping friends to travel to Europe and beyond. News spreads and the former printers slowly build a strong side-line in travel at the back of the Baldwins Stationery shop at 27 Grosvenor Road.

In 1905, Nippon Travel Agency became the first travel agency in Japan.

Originally, travel agencies largely catered to middle and upper-class customers but they became more commonplace with the development of commercial aviation.

In 1923, after being treated badly by a British travel agency, K. P. Chen formed what became the China Travel Service, the first travel agency in China.

The industry suffered during World War II. However, the Post–World War II economic expansion in mass-market package tours resulted in the proliferation of travel agencies catering to the working class.

In 1929, Intourist was formed as the official state travel agency of the Soviet Union, with the goal of convincing outsiders to visit the country.

In 1931, the US trade organization ASTA (originally the American Steamship and Tourist Agents Association, now the American Society of Travel Advisors) was created.

During the Cold War, travel agents were used by people from Western countries to travel behind the Iron Curtain.

In the early Cold War period, new intergovernmental programmes helped organise and subsidise long-distance migration from Europe, including the Provisional Intergovernmental Committee for the Movement of Migrants from Europe (PICMME), renamed the Intergovernmental Committee for European Migration (ICEM). In some countries, travel and migration agencies viewed these programmes as both competition and a source of new business opportunities, as the administration of passports, consular procedures, medical checks, and transport became more bureaucratised and commercially mediated.

In 1951, the precursor to Helloworld Travel became one of the first travel agencies in Australia.

In 1955, Henderson Travel Service in Atlanta, Georgia became the first African-American-owned travel company and the first to take large groups of black American tourists to Africa.

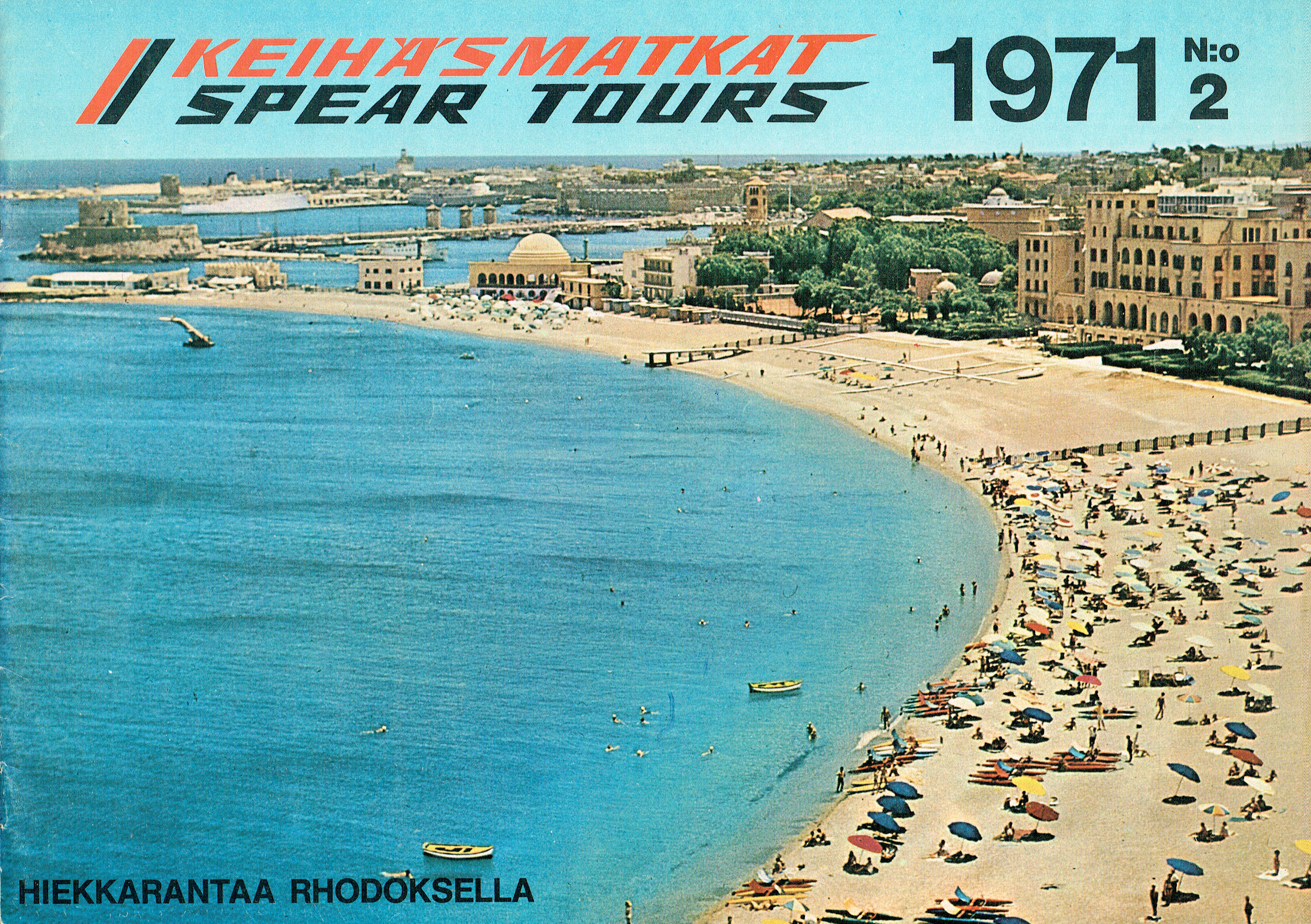
A Keihäsmatkat advertisement from Rhodes in 1971.

In the early 1980s, American Airlines' Sabre unit created a direct-to-consumer booking tool for flights, hotels and cars called eAAsySabre.

In 1989, with the liberalization of travel for South Koreans, Mode Tour became the first travel agency in the country.

In 1991, Hotel Reservations Network, the precursor of Hotels.com, was founded. At first, hotels did not pay much in commissions.

With the advent of the internet, travel agencies migrated online and underwent disintermediation by the reduction in costs caused by removing layers from the package holiday distribution network.

In 1994, Travelweb.com launched as the first online directory of hotels.

In 1995, Internet Travel Network sold the first airline ticket via the World Wide Web.

In October 1996, Expedia.com, funded with hundreds of millions of dollars by Microsoft launched as the first large online travel agency.

At the same time, Cheapflights started as a listing service for flight deals from consolidators.

In 1998, Lastminute.com was founded in the United Kingdom.

In 1999, Expedia went public on the Nasdaq stock exchange. From 1999 to 2006, the number of travel agents in the United States plunged from 124,000 to 88,000 as many Americans switched to making their own travel arrangements online.

Also in 1999, European airlines began eliminating or reducing commissions, while Singapore Airlines did so in parts of Asia. In 2002, several airlines in the United States did the same, which led to an unsuccessful lawsuit alleging collusion among the airlines, that was decided on appeal in 2009.

In 2007, the launch of the iPhone and related mobile apps increased travel bookings made online.

In 2008, the launch of Airbnb created an online marketplace for spare bedrooms and apartments.

In 2011, the launch of HotelTonight highlighted instantaneous same-day hotel room booking.

In 2021, travel agency Baldwins Travel Group, which was founded in 1895 was bought by business group Inc & Co.

== Outlook ==
According to the United States Bureau of Labor Statistics, in 2022, there were 66,300 people who were employed as travel agents for their full-time jobs. That number is projected to increase by 3% over the next 10 years. In 2022, the BLS lists the median travel agent salary as $46,400 per year.

Host Agency Reviews lists employee salaries by compensation structure, listing the 2022 income for travel agents that earn salary + commissions (25% of travel advisor employees) at $88,909, those that earn salary/hourly only at $50,792 (44% of employee travel agents), and commission only travel employees at $21,932 (31%).

However, job prospects should be best for travel agents who specialize in specific destinations or particular types of travelers.

Several reports show that the number of people using travel agents to book travel has been increasing.

== See also ==
- Destination marketing organization
- Hotel consolidator
- Tour guide
- Tour operator
- Tourism minister
