= Travel technology =

Use of IT or ICT in the travel industry

Travel technology (also called tourism technology, and hospitality automation) is the application of Information Technology (IT) or Information and Communications Technology (ICT) in the travel, tourism and hospitality industry. Some forms of travel technology are flight tracking, pre-travel planning through online travel agencies, and systems that allow tourists to review their experiences.

Travel technology was originally associated with the computer reservations system (CRS) of the airline industry, but is now used more inclusively, incorporating the broader tourism sector as well as its subset the hospitality industry.

== Online travel agencies ==
Booking engines allow easy access for consumers and travel professionals; the systems enable individuals to make reservations and compare prices. Online travel agencies such as expedia.com, are a large contribution to how the travel and tourism industries have changed due to technology. These online agencies help users plan and book trips and provide comparisons of hotels, flights, vacation packages, prices and more, all in one place. The change from of-person to online travel agencies gives the customer more power in planning their trip.

Beyond consumer-facing online travel agencies, a broader B2B travel technology ecosystem has developed to support the distribution of travel content. Travel distribution platforms and technology providers connect travel suppliers, such as airlines and hotels, with downstream sellers including online travel agencies, travel management companies, and travel agencies. These platforms facilitate the global distribution of travel products by enabling suppliers to reach a wider range of sales channels, while helping travel sellers access a broader selection of inventory, content, and pricing options through technology integrations.

Companies such as Travelgenix are developing travel website technology platforms.

== Customer reviews ==
The increase in review websites has also had a huge impact on the tourism industry. Sites such as tripadvisor.com let users read, post, and interact with reviews of travel experiences and attractions others have had. eWOM, meaning electronic word of mouth, has become a big influence in consumer's attitudes and actions, resulting in different choices of products and planning aspects.

== Social media and mobile technologies ==
The introduction of smartphones and mobile applications has also had a big effect on the tourism industry. Social media posts allow users to gather general information, free of marketing bias. GPS and social media apps allow users to tag and share their locations. People no longer need to print out directions and can use map apps to help them get around. Social media users can search for locations on social media platforms and gain more knowledge of the locations without using a review site.

Applications such as Uber and Lyft have also made travelling easier. Users no longer have to plan ahead for transportation to and from an airport or a different destination. Ubers and Lyfts may also be used in place of a rental car.

== Mobile communication ==
Today the tour guide can be a GPS tour guide, and the guidebook could be an audioguide and trips could be planned completely online. The continuing evolution of information technology and the widespread public use of the Internet has created a number of conditions that have been both beneficial and detrimental to the modern travel agency. The Internet is reshaping many business aspects. As a result, the travel and tourism industries will have to continue to adapt to new technologies in the future.

== See also ==
- List of global distribution systems
- Online hotel reservations
