= Hitit Computer Services =

Travel technology company in Turkey

- Type: Public
- Traded as: BİST: HTTBT
- Industry: Travel technology
- Founded: 1994
- Headquarters: Istanbul, Turkey
- Key people: Nur Gökman; (CHAIRWOMAN OF THE BOARD OF DIRECTORS); Sezer Tuğ Özmutlu; (Chief Financial Officer); Nevra Onursal Karaağaç; (CHIEF EXECUTIVE OFFICER); Özgür Çuhadar; (Chief Technology Officer); Semra Kandemir; (Chief Strategy Officer); Semih Sakız; (Chief Application Engineering and Security Officer); Atilla Lise; (CHIEF TRANSPORTATION SOLUTIONS OFFICER)
- Services: Passenger Service Systems; Commercial and operational IT systems for the airline and travel industries
- Subsidiaries: SAAS Tourism Services
- Website: hitit.com

Hitit Computer Services is a travel technology company that provides commercial and operational IT systems for the airline and travel industry. It is headquartered in the ITU Arı Technopolis science park on the campus of Istanbul Technical University. Hitit is publicly listed at the Borsa Istanbul stock exchange since March 2022.

== Company Overview ==
Hitit was established as an airline and travel IT company by executives from Turkish Airlines in 1994. The first solution developed by the company was Crane FF, a Loyalty Management System (LMS) for frequent-flyer programs, which became the most widely used airline LMS in the world by 2012. Hitit introduced its new generation airline reservations system in 2004. The company opened an office in Dubai due to an increasing number of airline customers in the Middle East. Hitit is one of Turkey’s biggest software exporters: with 83% of its customer base being overseas and 92% of its revenues coming from exports, it became the 3rd largest service exporter of 2011.

The company had two divisions until 8 April 2014 when the Loyalty Division of Hitit was acquired by the Amadeus IT Group. The Airline Division of Hitit remains independent and continues to sell software to airlines and travel companies from Europe, Middle East, Africa and Asia. The company was in Deloitte's Technology Fast 500 EMEA list in 2013, and it is also an International Air Transport Association Strategic Partner. Today, the company sells products covering a range from passenger service systems to financial, operational and loyalty management systems. Recently, Pakistan International Airlines (PIAC) has acquired the services provided by HITIT.

== See also ==
- Amadeus IT Group
- Sabre Corporation
- Navitaire
