= Electronic miscellaneous document =

The electronic miscellaneous document (EMD) is an International Air Transport Association (IATA) standard for electronically documenting ancillary revenue; that is, all other sales and transactions between airlines and passengers besides electronic tickets. It is a step toward moving the airline industry to purely electronic transactions in the business-to-consumer context.

== Overview ==
The flaw with electronic tickets is that they only document one very simple type of transaction: a passenger boards a plane at point A and gets off at point B, and the airline charges (1) airfare and (2) taxes. At the time e-tickets were first implemented in the 1990s, this simple data structure was not a major problem because most airlines still practiced product bundling. That is, it was simply expected in most major markets that the price of a ticket included many other ancillary services like (1) checking up to two regular-sized bags and (2) one or two in-flight meals.

During the 1990s and 2000s, many airlines became financially distressed due to numerous factors: deregulation, competition from low-cost carriers, rising fuel prices, and economic shocks in the form of the dot-com bubble and later, the Great Recession. Low-cost pioneer Ryanair became notorious for raising ancillary revenue in the form of unbundling every possible component of airfare and adding it back on through optional fees.

However, because e-tickets are not designed to carry such additional information, many airlines are not able to actually charge those additional fees until the passenger makes their first direct contact with the airline through its Website or at an airport check-in kiosk or counter. This slows down check-in and frustrates consumers. To facilitate these new business processes, airlines either have implemented nonstandard proprietary mechanisms (such as when selling tickets through their own direct-to-consumer websites) or are tracking such transactions on paper forms, coupons or vouchers.

The IATA EMD standard document supports the fulfillment, payment, and tracking of services booked through travel agencies (via global distribution systems) or through an airline’s direct distribution channels (via its computer reservation system).

== Standard ==
The IATA EMD standard is documented in IATA Passenger Service Conference Resolution Manual in resolutions 725F, 725G, 725H.

Two types of EMD exist:

- EMD-A associated to an e-ticket
- EMD-S standalone

EMD implementation is part of an IATA Simplifying the Business program called e-services, endorsed by IATA board of governors.

Since 2009, IATA board of governors endorsed the replacement in IATA BSP (for GDS agents sales) of current virtual miscellaneous charge orders (VMCO) and virtual miscellaneous multi-purpose documents (VMPDs) at the end of 2013 by 100% EMD. This mean that starting 2014, VMCO and VMPD should not be processed any more by IATA BSP.

At the beginning of November 2013, IATA confirmed the sunset of vMCO documents in January 2014 and announced a delay to sunset the vMPD until November 2014. vMCO documents have been removed from IATA BSP in January 2014.

Since 1 November 2014, vMCO and vMPD documents are not anymore supported in IATA BSP, therefore IATA BSP only supports EMD and e-tickets.

The following computer reservations system have implemented the IATA EMD standard for airlines direct sales:

- Amadeus CRS from Amadeus IT Group
- Mercator from The Emirates Group
- Resiber from Iberia (airline)
- SabreSonic from Sabre (computer system)
- SITA
- Travelport
- TravelSky
- HP axsRES and Shares

The following ticket system providers have implemented the IATA EMD standard for travel agencies sales:

- Abacus
- Amadeus
- Axess
- Farelogix
- Infini
- Sabre
- Travelport (Apollo, Galileo, Worldspan)
- Travelsky
- IATA WebLink

The following system providers have developed their own EMD management system :

- Hexaware (HexEMD)

== Implementation ==
More than 180 airlines implemented the IATA EMD standard at the end of 2014. For example, Finnair was an early adopter of the IATA EMD standard "launching the first EMD in Europe".

Air China was the first Chinese airline to adopt the IATA EMD standard in 2010.

The list of airlines having implemented the IATA EMD standard is disclosed by IATA on IATA e-services project page.

At the end of 2014, the IATA EMD standard document had been issued and processed in 82 IATA BSP by more than 130 airlines.

More than 52 million EMD were issued in 2014, representing more than 2 billion USD.

== Interline ==
Just like the electronic ticket, the electronic miscellaneous document also supports interline standards.
