= Fare basis code =

Identifier for airline fare types

A fare basis code (often just referred to as a fare basis) is an alphabetic or alpha-numeric code used by airlines to identify a fare type and allow airline staff and travel agents to find the rules applicable to that fare. Although airlines now set their own fare basis codes, there are some patterns that have evolved over the years and may still be in use.

Airlines can create any number of booking or fare classes, to which different prices and booking conditions may apply. Fare classes are complicated and vary from airline to airline. The meaning of these codes is not often known by the passenger, but conveys information to airline staff; for example, they may indicate that a ticket was fully paid, discounted, part of an excursion package, or purchased through a loyalty scheme.

Fare codes start with a letter called a booking class (indicating travel class among other things), which almost always matches the letter code that the reservation is booked in. Other letters or numbers may follow. Typically a fare basis will be 3 to 7 characters long, but can be up to 8.

== Booking class ==
The first character of the fare basis code is always a letter, and will almost always match the booking class. Booking codes are the identifiers used by the airline's revenue management department to control how many seats can be sold at a particular fare level. For example, a plane may have 25 economy seats still available and the airline may show it in a reservation system as Y7 K5 M4 T6 E3 which indicates how many of each booking class can be reserved. Some codes cannot be sold by agents, and those seats may be reserved for international connections, loyalty programs, or airline staff relocation.

Booking codes were defined by IATA, but airlines have deviated from the IATA standard and current booking codes are airline-specific. The same code may have different meanings for tickets issued by different airlines. Many airlines use nearly all letters of the alphabet to allow finer yield management. Nevertheless, certain booking codes have retained the same meaning across most airlines:

Booking code	Meaning
F	full-fare First class, on airlines which have first class distinct from business class.
J	full-fare Business class
W	full-fare Premium economy
Y	full-fare Economy class

== Other common patterns ==
Letters and numbers in other sections of the fare basis code may provide the following information:

Code	Standard position in fare basis code	Meaning
E	Second letter	This often indicated that the fare was an "Excursion Fare". These fares typically had a minimum and maximum stay requirement to encourage use by the holiday market and not business travellers.
Numerals	Latter parts of the fare basis	Numerals often indicate the maximum stay the fare rules will allow at a destination. Thus a YE45 is an economy excursion fare with a maximum stay of 45 days. Similar patterns could be YE3M indicating a 3-month maximum.
H or L	Other than first letter	High or low season
W or X	Other than as the first letter	These two letters are commonly used in airfares to state if a fare is valid on a weekday (X) or restricted to weekends (W). The specific days of a weekend may vary, and can include Friday travel.
OW	On higher level fares, normally follows the initial booking code.	One-way fare only
RT	On higher level fares, normally follows the initial booking code.	Return fare
Two-letter country codes	Usually at the end of the code, except if followed by "CH" or "IN"	Fare bases often end with two-letter country codes. This will be the case when an airline has an international fare in both directions. For example, a fare from Great Britain to Australia may be YE3MGB, and YE3MAU from Australia to Great Britain. This allows the fare to have similar rules, but may have some variations in change fees or to comply with local trade restrictions.
CH	Last two characters	Child fare (typically up to 11 years old, but 15 in some cases)
IN	Last two characters	Infant fare (typically up to 2 years old, but 3 years in some cases)

== Airline-specific codes ==
There is an endless list of other codes on modern fares. These are not standardized in any way, and may often be for short-term use. The following are some examples:

- Codes that indicate an airline's common name for a fare. As a hypothetical example, an airline selling what they refer to as their "Super-Saver" fare may use SPRSVR in the fare basis, or may use it as the entire code.
- Codes that limit a fare to a particular company or organisation. An airline may negotiate a fare with the XYZ company and include these letters in their fare basis. Negotiated fares are normally only visible to agents that have a contract to sell them, and are not publicly listed.
- Codes for use with military personnel, or federal government employees. These are commonly used in the United States, and often indicate fares with minimal or no restrictions on changes and refunds.
- ID and AD used for airline staff (Industry Discount) and travel agency staff (Agent Discount). It may include a number indicating the percentage of discount from the full fare, e.g., AD75.

== Fare details ==
Each published fare basis code corresponds to a fare, which applies to travelling between two cities on a certain airline, with certain restrictions.

These restrictions can include, but not limited to:

- which particular flights can / cannot be taken on this fare
- whether the fare can be used for one-way / round-trip journeys
- changeability / refundability
- restrictions on connections and stopovers
- any minimum / maximum stay requirement (applicable for round-trip fares)
- whether open jaw is allowed or not
- combinability with other fares
- advanced purchase restrictions

which is published in legalese such that it can be validated automatically by global distribution systems.

== Fare construction ==
Fare construction refers to the application of fares which can cover the flights in the reservation, necessary to price the air ticket for issuance.

It is commonly presented as a single line with standardized codes which can be used for travel agents to price the ticket in global distribution systems. For example, a fare construction may say:

HKG	LX	X/ZRH	LX	ARN	598.78SCLA	/-CPH	SK	X/AMS	KL	RDU	371.37ACLA	NUC 970.15	END	ROE 7.849222	XT 160G3 120HK 45I5 105DK 33LV 61XM 713YQ
from Hong Kong	by Swiss International Air Lines	transfer in Zürich	by Swiss International Air Lines	to Stockholm-Arlanda	598.78 on fare SCLA	arrival unknown to Copenhagen	by Scandinavian Airlines	transfer at Amsterdam	by KLM	to Raleigh	371.37 on fare ACLA	total fare in NUC	end of fare	rate of exchange	the various taxes, fees and charges added in ticketing currency

Fare construction is a complicated task because each fare comes with a lot of rules regarding the usage, however the rules are designed to be validatable by computers so the system can decide to accept or reject easily. Most commonly fare construction is done by a computer automatically, but it is not guaranteed that the lowest fares can be found. Due to the above reason, or in case when the automatically generated fare has some restrictions which the traveller does not want, manual fare construction can also be done, which means finding the suitable fares manually and applying the fares to an itinerary in order to buy a ticket.

== Multiple fare basis ==
It is common for a multi-sector air ticket to have more than one fare basis, particularly if it is for carriage on more than one airline, or different classes of travel are involved. The issuing airline may often have an interline agreement to allow other airlines on the ticket. One disadvantage of this system is that if any change is made, the most restrictive fare rule, and/or the highest change fee, may apply to the entire ticket, not just the portion being changed.

== Global Distribution Systems ==
In a Global Distribution System, the fare basis will typically display as part of a fare display, and will not normally be shown in an availability display. Some modern booking systems allow availability searches using parameters such as time of day and lowest fare, and may negate the need for an agent to firstly study the fare basis rules.

== Tickets ==
The fare basis is normally shown on the air ticket. On older paper tickets, it was highlighted on the relevant coupon for that flight. On modern e-tickets, it is often printed under the flight details.

== See also ==
- Travel class
