= Reservation system =

Reservation system may refer to

- Computer reservation system
  - Airline reservation system
- Reservation in India
- Indian reservations, lands governed by Native American tribes in the United States.
