= List of airline codes (0–9) =

This is a list of all airline codes. The table lists the IATA airline designators, the ICAO airline designators and the airline call signs (telephony designator). Historical assignments are also included for completeness.

== Codes ==
Airline codes
IATA	ICAO	Airline	Callsign	Country	Comments
PR	BOI	2GO	ABAIR	Philippines	
	EVY	34 Squadron, Royal Australian Air Force	Multiple		
	GNL	135 Airways	GENERAL	United States	
1A	n/a	Amadeus IT Group S.A.	n/a	Global	GDS and airline hosting system (CRS/PSS)
1B	n/a	Sabre travel network Asia-Pacific (ex-Abacus)	n/a	APAC	Regional distribution
1E	n/a	Travelsky	n/a	China	Local distribution system and hosting system (CRS/PSS)
1F	n/a	Infini travel information, Inc.	n/a	Japan	Local distribution system (CRS)
1G	n/a	Travelport (Galileo core)	n/a	Global	GDS (CRS)
1H	n/a	Sirena travel	n/a	Russia	Local distribution system (CRS) and PSS
1J		PT. Navios Evolusi Solusindo		Indonesia	
1K		MixVel		Russia	
1M		Online Reservation System JSC		Russia	
1P	n/a	Travelport (Worldspan core)	n/a	United States	GDS (CRS)
1S	n/a	Sabre travel network	n/a	United States	GDS and airline hosting system (CRS/PSS)
1T	n/a	Hitit Computer Services	n/a	Turkey	Computer reservation system
1U	n/a	Google/ITA	n/a	United States	Airline IT provider
2T		Bermudair Limited		Bermuda	
	WYT	2 Sqn No 1 Elementary Flying Training School	WYTON	United Kingdom	Royal Air Force
	TFU	213th Flight Unit	THJY	Russia	State Airline
	CHD	223rd Flight Unit	CHKALOVSK-AVIA	Russia	State Airline
	TTF	224th Flight Unit	CARGO UNIT	Russia	State Airline
	TWF	247 Jet Ltd	CLOUD RUNNER	United Kingdom	
	SEC	3D Aviation	SECUREX	United States	
Q5	MLA	40-Mile Air	MILE-AIR	United States	
	QRT	4D Air	QUARTET	Thailand	Defunct
	PIU	43 Air School	PRIMA	South Africa	
4D	DIR	Flyyo	DIREKT WINGS	Romania	
4H	DRC	Air Congo (2024)	LEO PARC	Democratic Republic of the Congo	
4R	SEK	Star East Airline	EAST RIDER	Romania	
5W	WAZ	Wizz Air Abu Dhabi	WIZZ SKY	United Arab Emirates	
7B	UBE	Bees Airline	FLOWER BEE	Ukraine	Defunct, AOC revoked due to not having any aircraft.
AQ	JYH	9 Air	TRANS JADE	China	
	BRO	2Excel Aviation	BROADSWORD	United Kingdom	

== IATA Traffic Conference Areas ==
The International Air Transport Association (IATA) divides the world into three areas called the Traffic Conference Areas (TCAs) for air travel purposes. These areas are used to define geographical boundaries for fare construction and other industry-related practices:

- Traffic Conference Area 1 (TC1) – this area includes the Americas, encompassing North America (the Caribbean, Central America, and Northern America) and South America.
- Traffic Conference Area 2 (TC2) – this area includes the EMEA region, encompassing Europe, the Middle East, and Africa (North Africa and Sub-Saharan Africa).
- Traffic Conference Area 3 (TC3) – this area includes the Asia–Pacific region, encompassing the rest of Asia (Central Asia, East Asia, North Asia, South Asia, and Southeast Asia) and Oceania.

Essentially, TC1 covers the "New World", while TC2 and TC3 together cover the "Old World" (Africa-Eurasia) and the "Land Down Under".

== See also ==
- IATA airport code
- ICAO airport code
