= Airline reservations system =

System to sell airline tickets

Airline reservation systems (ARS) are systems that allow an airline to sell their inventory (seats). It contains information on schedules and fares and contains a database of reservations (or passenger name records) and of tickets issued (if applicable). ARSs are part of passenger service systems (PSS), which are applications supporting the direct contact with the passenger.

ARS eventually evolved into the computer reservations system (CRS). A computer reservation system is used for the reservations of a particular airline and interfaces with a global distribution system (GDS) which supports travel agencies and other distribution channels in making reservations for most major airlines in a single system.

== Overview ==
Airline reservation systems incorporate airline schedules, fare tariffs, passenger reservations and ticket records. An airline's direct distribution works within their own reservation system, as well as pushing out information to the GDS. The second type of direct distribution channel are consumers who use the internet or mobile applications to make their own reservations. Travel agencies and other indirect distribution channels access the same GDS as those accessed by the airline reservation systems, and all messaging is transmitted by a standardized messaging system that functions on two types of messaging that transmit on SITA's high level network (HLN). These messaging types are called Type A [usually EDIFACT format] for real time interactive communication and Type B [TTY] for informational and booking type of messages. Message construction standards set by IATA and ICAO, are global, and apply to more than air transportation. Since airline reservation systems are business critical applications, and they are functionally quite complex, the operation of an in-house airline reservation system is relatively expensive.

Prior to deregulation, airlines owned their own reservation systems with travel agents subscribing to them. Today, the GDS are run by independent companies with airlines and travel agencies being major subscribers.

As of February 2009, there are only a few major GDS providers in the market: Amadeus, Travelport (which operates the Apollo, Worldspan and Galileo systems), Sabre, InteliSys Aviation (which owns ameliaRES PSS) and Shares. There is one major Regional GDS, Abacus, serving the Asian market and a number of regional players serving single countries, including Travelsky (China), ORS (Russia), Infini and Axess (both Japan) and Topas (South Korea). Of these, Infini is hosted within the Sabre complex, Axess is in the process of moving into a partition within the Worldspan complex, and Topas agencies will be migrating into Amadeus.

Reservation systems may host "ticket-less" airlines and "hybrid" airlines that use e-ticketing in addition to ticket-less to accommodate code-shares and interlines.

In addition to these "standardized" GDS, some airlines have proprietary versions which they use to run their flight operations. A few examples are Delta's OSS and Deltamatic systems and EDS SHARES. SITA Reservations remains the largest neutral multi-host airline reservations system, with over 100 airlines currently managing inventory.

== Inventory management ==
In the airline industry, available seats are commonly referred to as inventory. The inventory of an airline is generally classified into service classes (e.g. economy, premium economy, business or first class) and any number of fare classes, to which different prices and booking conditions may apply. Fare classes are complicated and vary from airline to airline, often indicated by a one letter code. The meaning of these codes are not often known by the passenger, but conveys information to airline staff, for example they may indicate that a ticket was fully paid, or discounted or purchased through a loyalty scheme, etc. Some seats may not be available for open sale, but reserved for example for connecting flight or loyalty scheme passengers. Overbooking is also a common practice, and is an exception to inventory management principles. One of the core functions of inventory management is inventory control. Inventory control monitors how many seats are available in the different fare classes, and by opening and closing individual fare classes for sale.

A flight schedule management system forms the foundation of the inventory management system. Besides other functions, it is critical for ticket sales, crew member assignments, aircraft maintenance, airport coordination, and connections to partner airlines. The schedule system monitors what and when aircraft will be available on particular routes, and their internal configuration. Inventory data is imported and maintained from the schedule distribution system. Changes to aircraft availability would immediately impact the available seats of the fleet, as well as the seats which had been sold.

The price for each sold seat is determined by a combination of the fares and booking conditions stored in the Fare Quote System,. In most cases, inventory control has a real time interface to an airline's yield management system to support a permanent optimization of the offered booking classes in response to changes in demand or pricing strategies of competitors.

== Availability display and reservation (PNR) ==
Users access an airline's inventory through an availability display. It contains all offered flights for a particular city-pair with their available seats in the different booking classes. This display contains flights which are operated by the airline itself as well as code share flights which are operated in co-operation with another airline. If the city pair is not one on which the airline offers service, it may display a connection using its own flights or display the flights of other airlines. The availability of seats of other airlines is updated through standard industry interfaces. Depending on the type of co-operation, it supports access to the last seat (last seat availability) in real-time. Reservations for individual passengers or groups are stored in a so-called passenger name record (PNR). Among other data, the PNR contains personal information such as name, contact information or special services requests (SSRs) e.g. for a vegetarian meal, as well as the flights (segments) and issued tickets. Some reservation systems also allow to store customer data in profiles to avoid data re-entry each time a new reservation is made for a known passenger. In addition, most systems have interfaces to CRM systems or customer loyalty applications (a.k.a. frequent traveler systems). Before a flight departs, the so-called passenger name list (PNL) is handed over to the departure control system that is used to check-in passengers and baggage. Reservation data such as the number of booked passengers and special service requests is also transferred to flight operations systems, crew management and catering systems. Once a flight has departed, the reservation system is updated with a list of the checked-in passengers (e.g. passengers who had a reservation but did not check in (no shows) and passengers who checked in, but did not have a reservation (go shows)). Finally, data needed for revenue accounting and reporting is handed over to administrative systems.

== Fare quote and ticketing ==
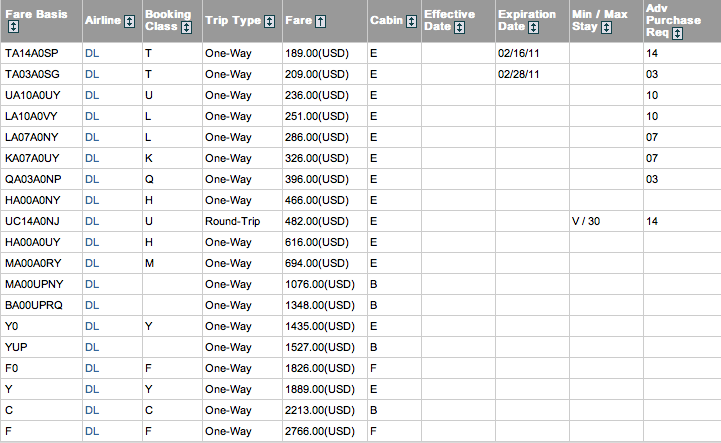
List of fares for travel on Delta Air Lines from San Francisco, CA to Boston, MA. Applicable booking classes, as well as specific restrictions such as minimum stay and advance purchase can be seen.

The Fares data store contains fare tariffs, rule sets, routing maps, class of service tables, and some tax information that construct the price – "the fare". Rules like booking conditions (e.g. minimum stay, advance purchase, etc.) are tailored differently between different city pairs or zones, and assigned a class of service corresponding to its appropriate inventory bucket. Inventory control can also be manipulated manually through the availability feeds, dynamically controlling how many seats are offered for a particular price by opening and closing particular classes.

The compiled set of fare conditions is called a fare basis code. There are two systems set up for the interchange of fares data — ATPCO and SITA, plus some system to system direct connects. This system distributes the fare tariffs and rule sets to all GDSs and other subscribers. Every airline employs staff who code air fare rules in accordance with yield management intent. There are also revenue managers who watch fares as they are filed into the public tariffs and make competitive recommendations. Inventory control is typically manipulated from here, using availability feeds to open and close classes of service.

The role of the ticketing complex is to issue and store electronic ticket records and the very small number of paper tickets that are still issued. Miscellaneous charges order (MCO) is still a paper document; IATA has working groups defining the replacement document the electronic multipurpose document (EMD) as at 2010. The electronic ticket information is stored in a database containing the data that historically was printed on a paper ticket including items such as the ticket number, the fare and tax components of the ticket price or exchange rate information. In the past, airlines issued paper tickets; since 2008, IATA has been supporting a resolution to move to 100% electronic ticketing. So far, the industry has not been able to comply due to various technological and international limitations. The industry is at 98% electronic ticket issuance today, although electronic processing for MCOs was not available in time for the IATA mandate.

== Notable systems ==
Name	Description	Vendor
ACCELaero	PSS, reservations, DCS, inventory and e-commerce platform.	Information Systems Associates FZE
AirCore	Passenger services system (PSS) of modular, open-platform, web applications that replace core legacy systems.	Unisys
Altéa Res	Integrated airline reservation system and global distribution system (GDS).	Amadeus IT Group
ameliaRES	The World’s First 100% Cloud-Based Open Major PSS which contains comprehensive tools IBE, Mobile, Call Centre, OTAs, APIs, and GDS, leveraging airlines in all types and sizes.	InteliSys Aviation
Crane PAX	Web-based airline reservations and ticketing system.	Hitit Computer Services
iFlyRes	Cloud-based next-generation airline passenger service system.	IBS Software
Navitaire New Skies Integrated Customer Centric Passenger Service System	Integrated reservations, departure control, inventory system and e-commerce platform.	Navitaire
Radixx International	Hybrid travel distribution and PSS.	
SabreSonic Customer Sales & Service	Integrated reservations, departure control, inventory system and e-commerce platform.	Sabre Airline Solutions
SITA Horizon Customer Sales & Service	Integrated reservations, departure control, inventory system and e-commerce platform.	SITA
Travel Technology Interactive Solutions	Integrated airline management system and global distribution system (GDS).	Travel Technology Interactive
Videcom Reservations System (VRS)	GDS, IET, Codeshare.	Videcom international
ORS PSS	Integrated reservations, DCS, CRS and e-commerce modules	ORS

== History ==
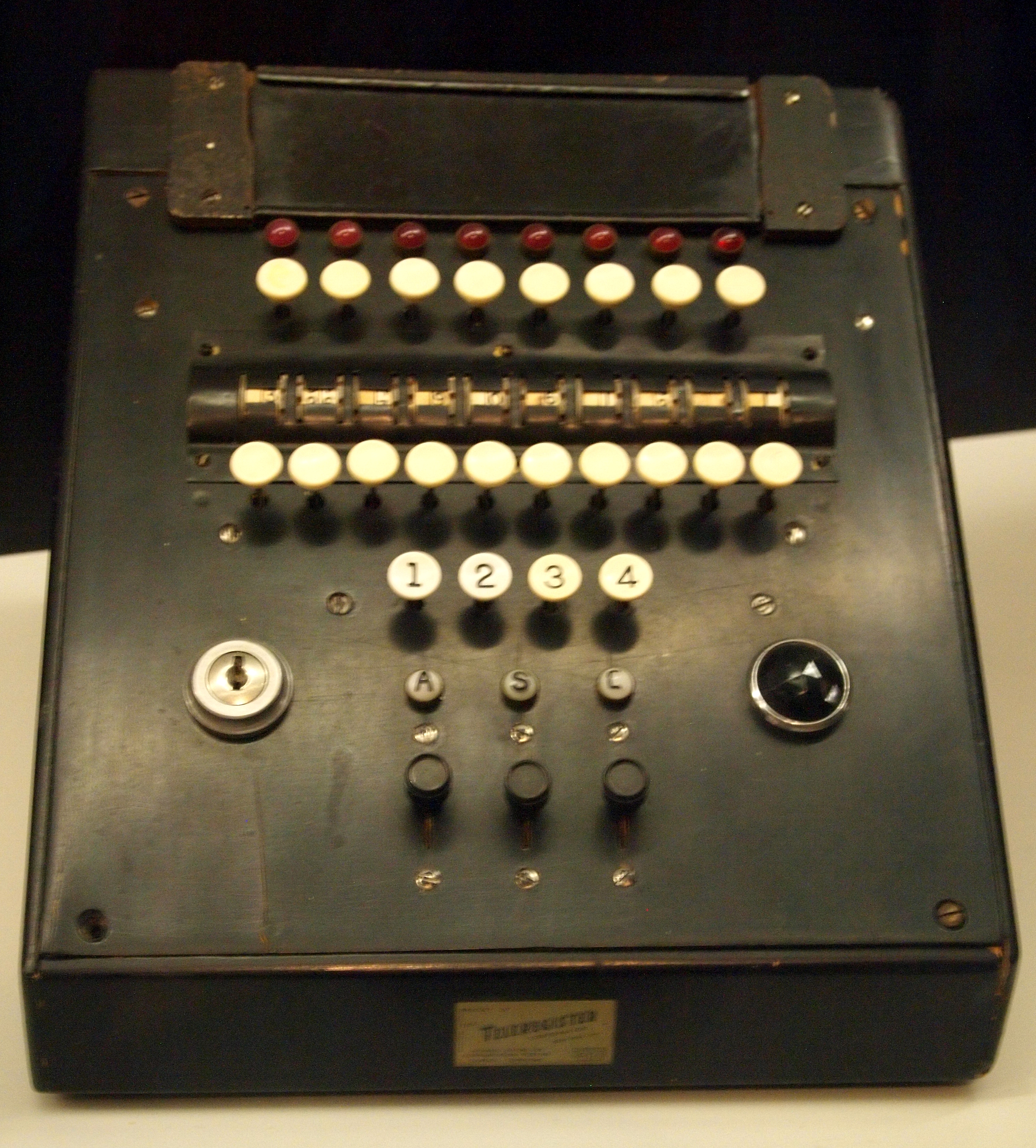
Agent set of the Magnetronic Reservisor system

American Airlines and Teleregister Company developed a number of automated airline booking systems known as Reservisor. it first version was an electromechanical version of the flight boards introduced for the "sell and report" system that was installed in American's Boston reservation office in February 1946. These simple vacuum tube and electromechanical computers were based on telephone switching systems made by Teleregister.

In the late 1950s, the American Airles wanted a system that would allow real-time access to flight details in all of its offices, and the integration and automation of its booking and ticketing processes. It introduced an electronic reservations system, Magnetronic Reservisor, in 1952.

The first computerized booking system was the little-known Trans-Canada Air Lines (today's Air Canada) system, ReserVec developed by Ferranti Canada . It started to be delivered in April 1961 and by January 24, 1963 completed the airline switch-over from the manual systems. InteliSys Aviation in Canada continues this tradition of innovation with the first 100% cloud-based Passenger Service System.

Shortly after, in 1962 another computerized reservation system began to be delivered to United Airlines which was one of the largest computer systems at that time, controlling 60 cities in a communication system that provided one second response time. Developed by Evelyn Berezin at the Teleregister Company, it was an update to the era of the transistor of its line of Reservisor systems making them now fully electronic.

In 1964, American Airlines developed SABRE (Semi-Automated Business Research Environment) using IBM hardware. What made SABRE revolutionary was that it enabled American Airlines sales agents around the world to view seat inventory and book tickets in real time. SABRE reduced a process which formerly took 90 minutes on average to a few seconds. However, for its first decade, SABRE could be accessed directly only by American Airlines employees at American Airlines offices. It was opened to outside travel agents in 1976, as part of the larger evolution of the ARS into the CRS and ultimately the GDS.

The deregulation of the airline industry, in the Airline Deregulation Act, meant that airlines, which had previously operated under government-set fares ensuring airlines at least broke even, now needed to improve efficiency to compete in a free market. In this deregulated environment, the ARS and its descendants became vital to the travel industry.

== See also ==
- USAS (application)
- List of global distribution systems
