= EMDS =

EMDS may refer to:

- Ecosystem Management Decision Support, an application framework
- Electromagnetic Design System, electronic design software

== See also ==
- EMD (disambiguation)
