= Central reservation system =

Central reservation system may refer to:

- Airline reservations system, the reservation system used by an airline company
- Hotel reservation system, the central reservation system used by the hotel and resort industry
- Computer reservation system, another name for the airline reservation systems used by travel agents
