= Navitaire =

American travel technology company

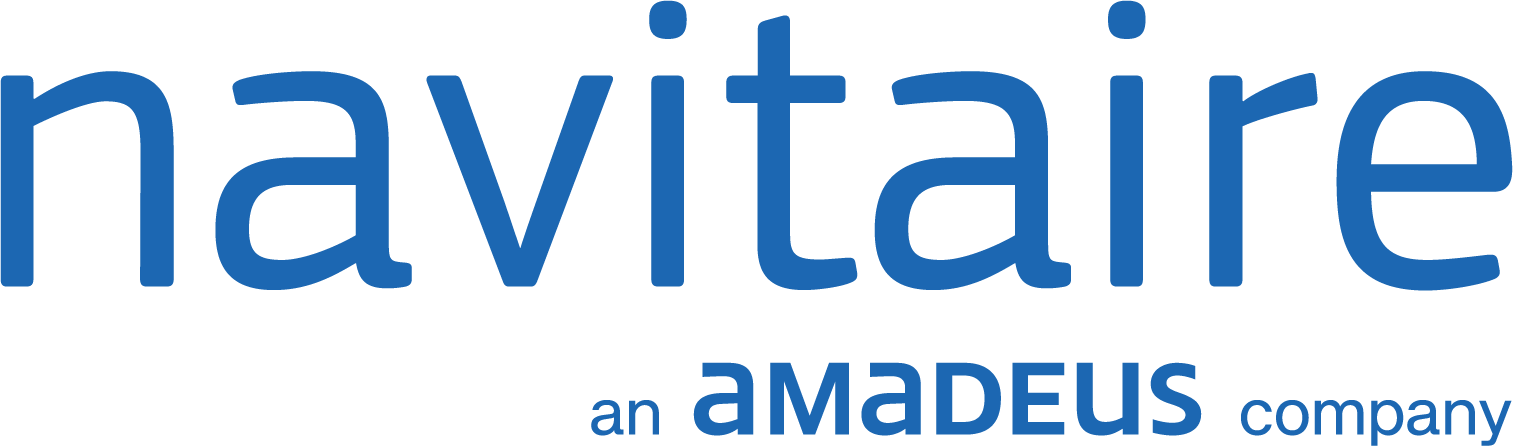
- Type: Privately held subsidiary
- Industry: Travel Technology
- Founded: 1993 (as PRA Solutions LLC); 2001 as Navitaire LLC
- Headquarters: Minneapolis, Minnesota
- Area served: Worldwide
- Key people: David P. Evans (Former CEO & Founder)
- Services: Travel Technology Solutions
- Parent: Amadeus
- Website: www.navitaire.com

Navitaire LLC is a subsidiary of Amadeus IT Group. Navitaire primarily offers systems for passenger reservations, travel commerce, ancillary revenue and merchandising, as well as revenue accounting and revenue management to airlines and rail companies.

== Overview ==
Navitaire is a subsidiary of Amadeus that provides technology services to the airline and rail industries. Its headquarters are in Minneapolis with offices in London, Manila, Salt Lake City, and Sydney. It has data centers in Minneapolis, Salt Lake City, and Sydney. David Evans has held the role of global managing director since 2013. Navitaire has approximately 60 clients and 750 employees. it typically works with low-cost carriers (LCC) and hybrid airlines and is the leading passenger service system provider for the LCC market. As of 2014, the firm serves 43% of the top 100 LCCs, and 47% of the top 30 LCCs as measured by seats sold per week. Clients include airlines Wizz Air, Jetstar, Spirit Airlines, Azul Brazilian Airlines, HK Express, and Volaris. The company also works with railway company SNCF and its subsidiary iDTGV.

== History ==
Navitaire was founded as PRA Solutions in 1993 by Accenture. It initially provided airline revenue accounting software and revenue protection software for airlines. The company then developed a direct-distribution platform to book airline reservations, "World Network," an alternative to the global distribution system traditionally used by travel agents to sell airline flights. In 2000, PRA Solutions purchased the Open Skies reservation system from Hewlett Packard, and in 2001, changed its name to Navitaire.

In 2002, the firm implemented codeshare technology for Virgin Blue, and the company later introduced multi-city bookings at the request of Jetstar. Following Hewlett Packard's announcement in 2001 of its plans to discontinue support for the HP3000 hardware that the Open Skies system operated on, Navitaire developed a replacement reservation system called New Skies. The company began converting clients to the new system in 2005. Navitaire was acquired by Amadeus in 2015.

== Products and services ==
Navitaire's passenger service system is New Skies, which was introduced in 2005. It introduced features including a low fare finder and multi-city bookings. The system provides reservations via the Internet, call centers, and through global distribution systems (GDS) using a ticketless model as well as enabling e-ticketing. It also allows integration with other travel services such as travel insurance and car rental, as well as codeshare agreements with other airlines. As of 2010, the firm had 80 such codeshare connections to partner airlines, as well as nine GDS connections.

Navitaire offers additional products and services including Travel Commerce, a platform to aid in ancillary revenue generation and a loyalty system. The company also offers real-time reporting, revenue accounting software and revenue management. It provides a reservations management system for railways called Navitaire Rail, which facilitates multi-channel distribution sales and station check-ins for rail carriers.

== Awards ==
In October 2010, Navitaire was awarded for Best Sales and Distribution Innovation at the 4th Annual Budgies World Low Cost Airlines Awards. The company was awarded Innovation of the Year in the category of Ancillary Revenue & Merchandising at Airline Information's 2013 Mega Awards, after being named a runner-up in the Ancillary Revenue & Merchandising - Most Innovative Technology category at the Mega Awards event held in November 2012. In December 2013, Navitaire received a Tekne Award from Minnesota High Tech Association for its ticketless system and other services. In March 2019, Navitaire became the first passenger revenue accounting provider to be granted ONE Order (00) Capable certification form the International Air Transport Association (IATA).
