= Amadeus CRS =

Computer reservation system

Amadeus is a computer reservation system (or global distribution system (GDS), since it sells tickets for multiple airlines) owned by the Amadeus IT Group with headquarters in Madrid, Spain. The central database is located at Erding, Germany. The major development centres are located in Sophia Antipolis (France), Bangalore (India), London (United Kingdom), and Boston (United States). In addition to airlines, the CRS is also used to book train travel, cruises, car rental, ferry reservations, and hotel rooms. Amadeus also provides New Generation departure control systems to airlines. Amadeus IT Group is a transaction processor for the global travel and tourism industry. The company is structured around two key related areas—its global distribution system and its "IT Solutions" business area.

Amadeus was founded in 1987 by a consortium of European airlines: Air France, Iberia, Lufthansa and Scandinavian Airlines. Main competitors for Amadeus are GDS providers Sabre Corporation and Galileo GDS. The travel professionals network EG SKY estimates that Amadeus, Sabre, and Galileo have market shares of around 40%, 30%, and 20%, respectively.

Amadeus is a member of IATA, OTA and SITA. Its IATA airline designator code is 1A.

== See also ==
- Codeshare agreement
- Passenger name record (PNR)
