= Premium economy class =

Travel class offered on some airlines

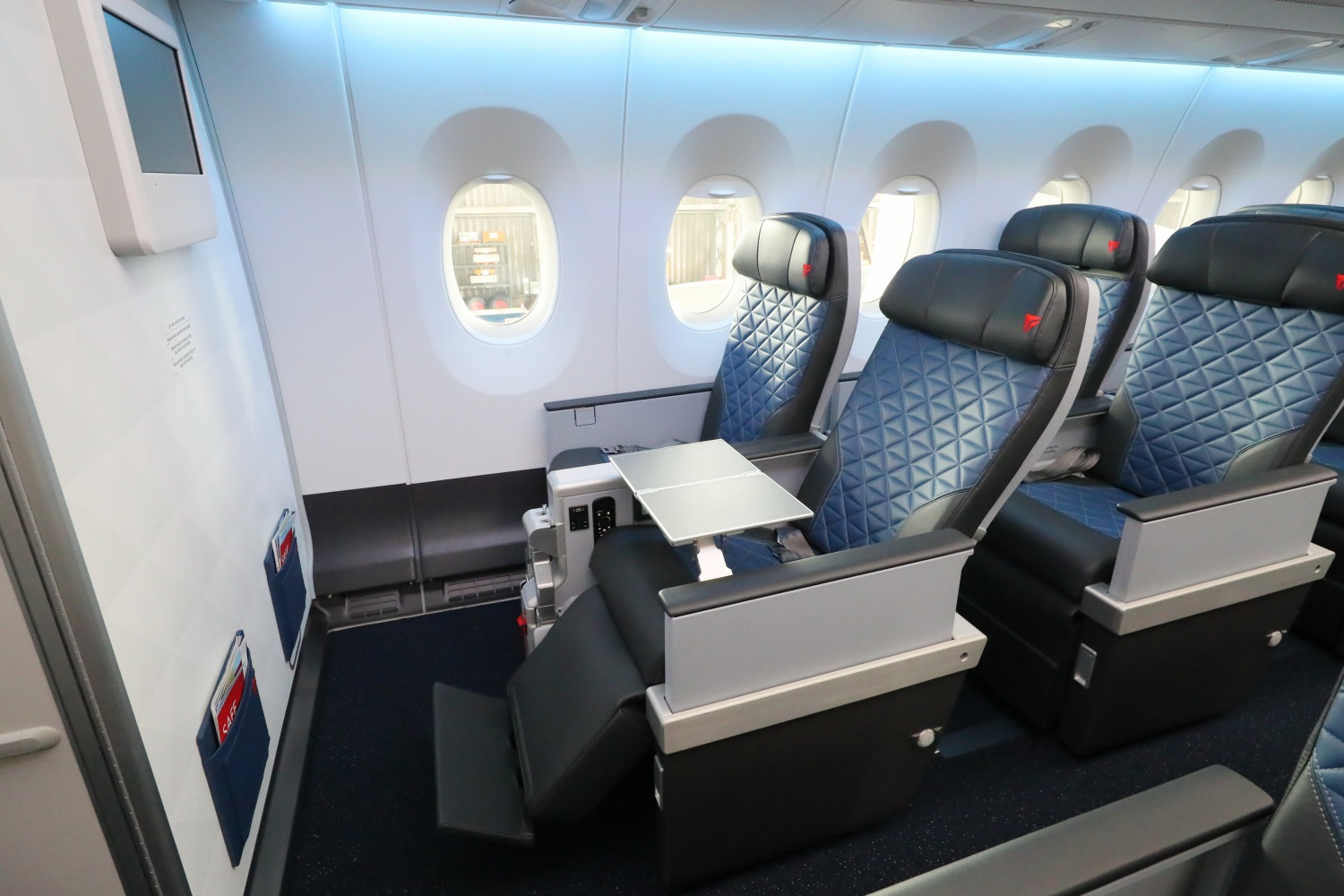
Delta Air Lines Airbus A350 Premium economy class seats

Premium economy class, also known by brand names which vary by company, is a travel class offered on many airlines. It is usually positioned between standard economy class and business class in terms of price, comfort, and available amenities. On 12 December 1992, EVA Air introduced the Economy Deluxe Class (later renamed Evergreen Deluxe, then Elite Class, and finally Premium Economy Class) on the inaugural flight of its first trans-Pacific route (Taipei-Los Angeles), becoming the first airline to offer this class of service. In some countries, this class has emerged as a response from governments and companies requiring economy class for travel done by staff, while still getting some benefits like airport priority. Premium economy generally offers a level of comfort similar to the standard Economy Class of several decades ago. In the 1970s, for example, many airlines offered economy class seat pitches of approximately 34–36 inches; United Airlines reportedly provided around 36 inches, comparable to the seat pitch offered by many carriers’ premium economy cabins today.

== Characteristics ==
The term "premium economy class" has not been standardised among airlines, and varies significantly depending on the carrier. Premium economy is sometimes limited to expanded leg room, but its most comprehensive versions can feature services associated with business class travel.

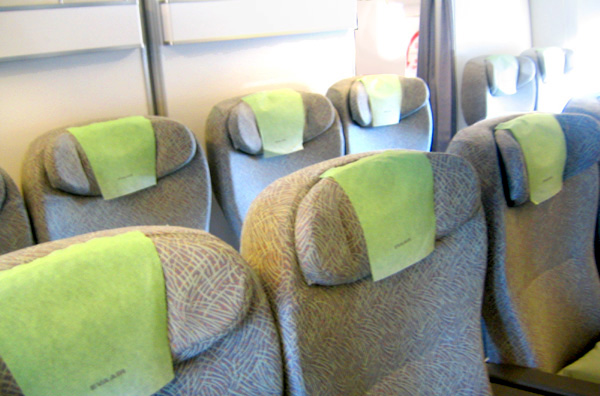
Old premium economy class seats on EVA Air.

Air New Zealand's and Qantas's premium economy classes include amenities such as prioritised check-in, large customised seats (some for couples, others targeting solo travellers), seat pitch up to 41 in (100 cm) with 50% more recline, premium meals, a self-service bar for drinks and snacks, a personal in-flight entertainment (IFE) centre with a retractable remote control, noise-cancelling headphones, choices in games, songs and movies for children and adults, a live viewing of the plane on a map, skin care products in the lavatory, and an amenities pouch containing items such as socks, sleep masks, pillow mist, hand lotion, lip balm, earplugs, and toothbrushes.

Service codes used by airlines vary, but W is the most common code.

== Examples of differences ==
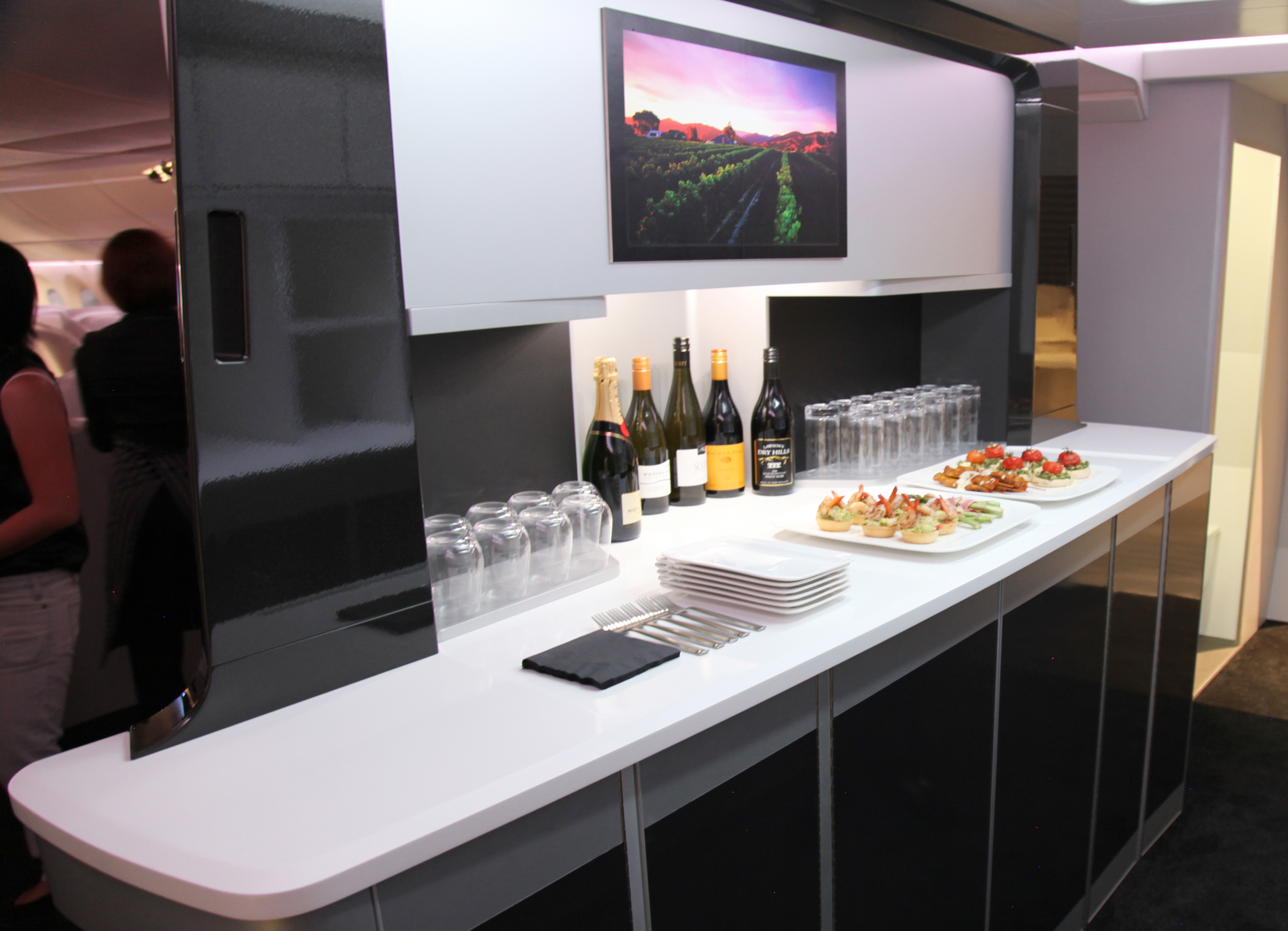
An Air New Zealand premium economy class galley bar in 2011

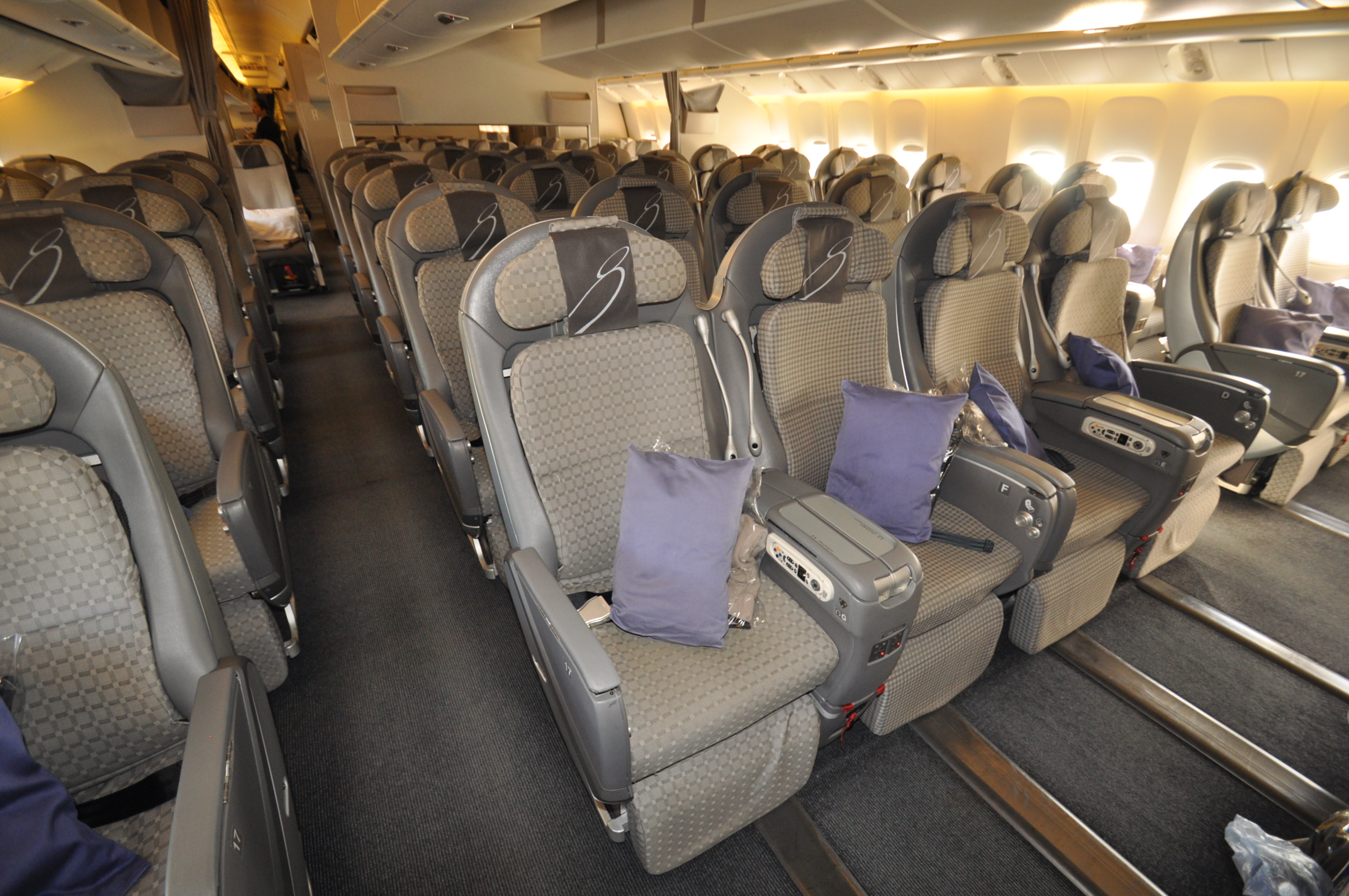
A Japan Airlines premium economy class cabin in 2012

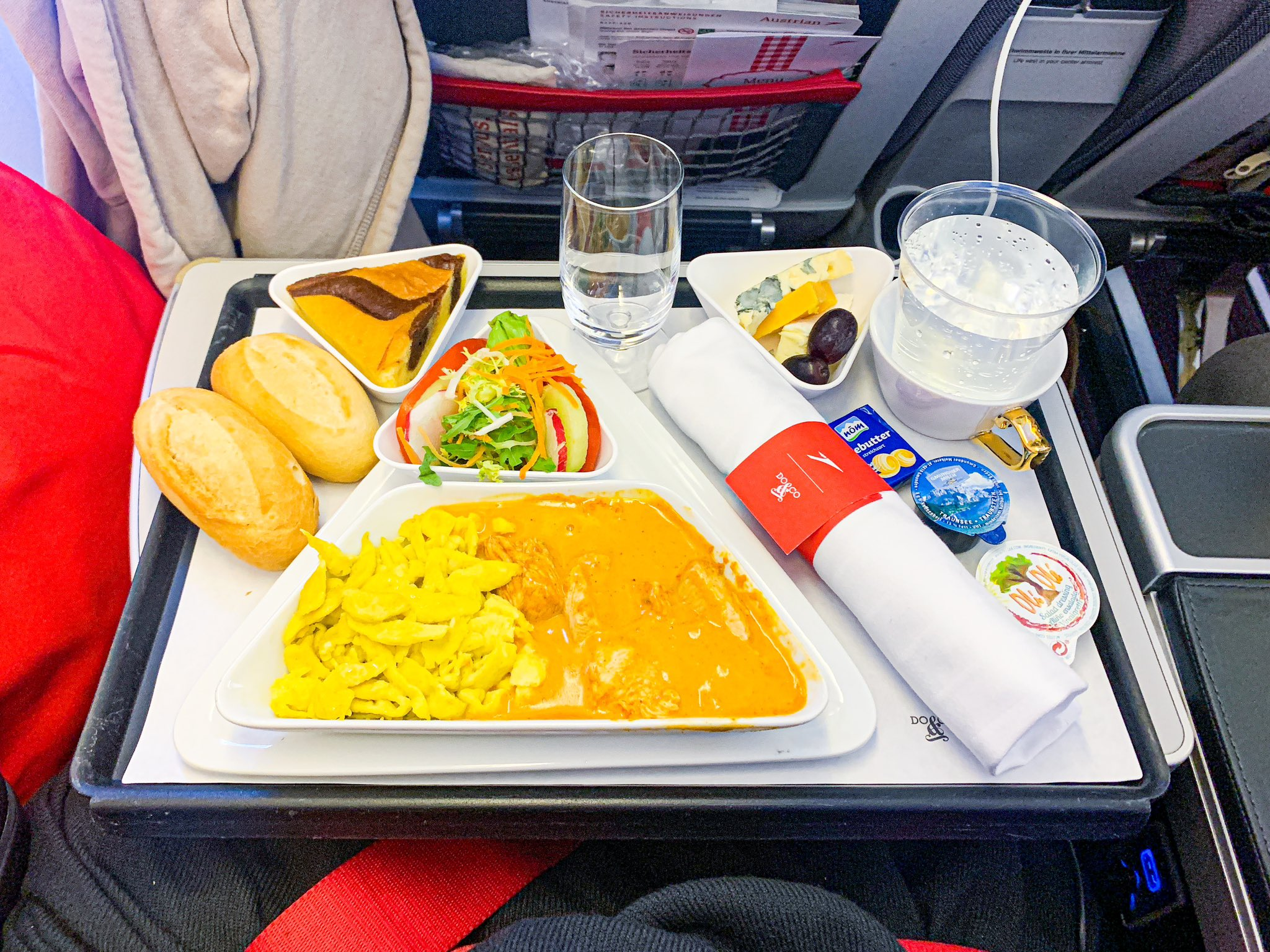
An Austrian Airlines premium economy class in-flight meal in 2023

Differences between premium economy class and standard economy class may include (varies by airline and country):

- a free upgrade to premium members of frequent-flyer program and passengers flying full-fare economy,
- a separate section of the economy/coach cabin with more legroom (36–42 in (91–107 cm) seat pitch), along with some form of leg rest,
- improved in-flight entertainment features (larger screen, more options, included headphones, etc.)
- dedicated cabin crew
- smaller cabin size
- better seats (often fewer seats per row, allowing seats to be wider, and to increase shoulder/elbow room, further ahead which gives less engine noise and faster deplaning), improved legroom and increased seat pitch
- at-seat laptop power
- at-seat telephone
- lounge access (for some airlines)
- priority check in/security check/boarding
- increased frequent flyer points
- exclusive amenity kits
- hot towel service
- welcome drinks (juice or champagne)
- upgraded meals and drinks
- increased luggage allowance
- better re-booking possibility

Some airlines may designate an entire economy class as premium, such as United Airlines on its transcontinental Boeing 757-200 premium service aircraft, or Singapore Airlines' Airbus A350-900 Ultra Long Range (ULR) aircraft. Among other airlines, premium economy may be what used to be regular economy before more seats were added, or just the most attractive rows in the economy section. Premium economy tickets also normally earn more mileage in an airline's frequent flyer program, attracting a bonus between economy and business. These upgrades tend to be more common on wide-body aircraft, such as the Boeing 747 and Boeing 777, and less common on narrow-body aircraft, such as the Boeing 737.

== Configuration ==
- Six-abreast configuration (2–2–2 configuration)
  - Boeing 767
- Seven-abreast configuration (2–3–2 configuration)
  - Airbus A330
  - Airbus A330neo
  - Airbus A340
  - Airbus A350 XWB (applicable for China Airlines, Emirates, Lufthansa, and Swiss International Air Lines use only, also on selected aircraft of Air Caraïbes and French Bee)
  - Airbus A380 (upper deck)
  - Boeing 787 Dreamliner
- Eight-abreast configuration (2–4–2 configuration)
  - Airbus A350 XWB (applicable for most of the other aviation in the world)
  - Airbus A380 (main deck)
  - Boeing 747
  - Boeing 777

== Airlines ==
Airlines offering this service include:

- Aerolíneas Argentinas: Club Economy: Only on Boeing 737s and Embraer E190s. Replacing business class on all domestic flights and international flights under four hours. Offers similar benefits to business class, including lounge access.
- Aeroflot: Comfort class
- Aeroméxico: Aeroméxico Plus, now standard across the entire Boeing fleet. Offers 4 in (10 cm) extra legroom, 1.5 in (3.8 cm) more recline and adjustable leather headrests. Includes priority check-in, baggage handling, boarding and deplaning, as well as extra mileage for frequent flyers.
- Air Austral: Classe Comfort
- Air Senegal: Premium Economy is offered on their Airbus A330-900, in a 2–3–2 configuration, in contrast to 2–4–2 (Economy) and 1–2–1 (Business)
- Air Canada: Premium Economy – on all routes operated by the Boeing 777, Airbus A330-300 and Boeing 787 aircraft.
- Air Caraïbes: La Classe Caraïbes (long haul only. Offers 36 in (91 cm) of pitch, more recline, a wider seat, a larger personal television (PTV) and more)
- Air China: Premium Economy Class (only on Airbus A330-300s, A350-900 and Boeing 787-9 Dreamliner. Wider seat with at least 36 in (91 cm) of pitch, nearly double recline and a PTV, plus more amenities. The new Boeing 747-8s and 787-9s will also offer Premium Economy)
- Air France: Premium Economy. Offers SkyPriority, paid lounge access, improved meals (including stainless steel cutlery and real glass drink ware), a separate cabin featuring fixed shell seats with a 38 in (97 cm) pitch and extra wide armrests.
- Air India: Premium Economy – More legroom, premium comfortable seats, hot towels and welcome drinks, premium meals, wider selection of beverages, noise cancelling headphones and premium TUMI amenities. Only on A350-900, 777-200LR, A321neo, A320neo, and 787-9.
- Air Transat: Club Class, offering additional legroom and services.
- Air New Zealand: Premium Economy (all routes operated by wide-body aircraft, offers 41 in (100 cm) pitch and more recline. Includes premium meals and check-in, two checked bags and two carry bags.)
- AirAsia: Hot seat
- AirAsia X: Hot seat
- AirTanker Services: 291 premium economy seats are installed in their military Royal Air Force (RAF) Voyager KC2 and KC3 aircraft (the RAF name for their fleet of Airbus A330 MRTT), whereas their leased civilian A320-243 aircraft are fitted with up to 327 standard economy seats
- Alaska Airlines: Premium Class: Offers 4 in (10 cm) more pitch, priority boarding, premium snack, and premium beverage.
- All Nippon Airways: Premium Economy class offers wider seats, more legroom and a footrest. Perks includes dedicated check-in counter, priority baggage handling, and lounge access.
- Allegiant Air: Legroom Plus: Offers up to 4 in (10 cm) more pitch. Giant Seats: Only on Boeing 757s. Bigger seats with at least 6 in (15 cm) more pitch, similar to Spirit's Big Front Seats.
- American Airlines: Main Cabin Extra (offers a slightly wider seat only on the Boeing 777-300ER, 2 in (5.1 cm) more recline and 4–6 in (10–15 cm) more legroom but no other benefits). Premium economy is available on the entire long-haul fleet. Premium Economy customers also get two free checked bags, priority boarding, and enhanced food and drink service including free alcohol. American Airlines was the first United States carrier to offer a four-cabin aircraft.
- Asiana Airlines: Economy Smartium on all Airbus A350-900.
- Austrian Airlines: Premium Economy
- Avianca: Economy Plus
- Biman Bangladesh Airlines: Premium Economy available on the Boeing 787-9 Dreamliner.
- British Airways: World Traveller Plus is BA's premium economy class and it offers more spacious seats in a separate cabin, free alcoholic beverages and better food options.
- Brussels Airlines: Economy Privilege
- Cathay Pacific: Premium Economy on Airbus A350 fleet and selected Boeing 777-300ER aircraft.
- China Airlines: Premium Economy Class available on Boeing 777-300ER and Airbus A350-900.
- China Southern Airlines: Premium Economy Class is available on Airbus A330 aircraft only, as it offers more spacious seats, up to 37 in (94 cm) of seat pitch, and better meals.
- Condor: Premium Economy offers more recline and 5.9 in (15 cm) more legroom on long haul flights in its Boeing 767-300 fleet, free spirits during meals, free amenity kits, free headsets and more. Short haul planes have the middle seat blocked off and no extra legroom or recline.
- Delta Air Lines: Delta Comfort+ (offers up to 36 in (91 cm) of pitch, especially on planes with a pitch of either 32 or 33 in (81 or 84 cm) inches in economy class) and free HBO programming. 50% more recline and free spirits are also offered on long-haul, transcontinental and international flights. Transcontinental flights between New Yorkl and Los Angeles / Seattle–Tacoma / San Francisco also get one free premium snack and a free cold meal from Luvo Inc., as well as a pre-departure bottle of water and a sleep kit)
- Edelweiss Air: Economy Max: Long-haul only. Offers 5.9 in (15 cm) more pitch and 2.0 in (5 cm) more recline (37 in (94 cm) of pitch and 7.9 in (20 cm) of recline in lieu of 31 in (79 cm) of pitch and 5.9 in (15 cm) of recline in Economy), as well as free alcohol and an amenity kit.
- El Al: Premium Class on Boeing 787s and certain 777s retrofitted with the new cabin. Offers 4 in (10 cm) more pitch (36 in (91 cm) up from the usual 32 in (81 cm)), 33 per cent more recline, a footrest, priority ground service, a comfort kit, and a bottle holder. Prior to the introduction of the 787s, certain economy class seats in the 747s, 767s, and 777s with increased legroom were advertised as Economy Plus, though they received the same service as ordinary economy-class seats.
- Emirates: Premium economy class is available only on Airbus A380 services between Dubai, Paris, London, Sydney, New York (from 1 December 2022), Auckland (from January 2023), Melbourne (from February 2023), San Francisco (from February 2023), Singapore (from March 2023) and Christchurch (from March 2023).
- EVA Air: Premium Economy Class on all Boeing 777-300ER aircraft and some Boeing 787-9 aircraft.
- Finnair: Premium Economy class is available on select flights to Asia and North America on Airbus A350 and A330 aircraft. Offers 38 in (97 cm) pitch, comfier headrests, an amenity kit, better headphones and upgraded dining.
- Frontier Airlines: Stretch (first four rows and exit rows of Airbus offering a minimum of 36 in (91 cm) pitch.)
- Hainan Airlines: Premium Economy Class is available on some Boeing 737-800 and 787-9
- Hawaiian Airlines: Extra Comfort (Airbus A330-200 and A321neo aircraft, comes with priority boarding, full 36 in (91 cm)) of legroom, complimentary on-demand in-seat entertainment, upgraded meal on international main meal only, comfort kit on international routes only, complimentary pillow and blanket on all domestic routes, souvenir pillow and blanket set on international routes only).
- Iberia: Premium Economy on Airbus A340 and A330: Larger seat width / pitch, larger IFE screen, amenity kit, and priority check in/boarding.
- Icelandair: Economy comfort
- Japan Airlines: Premium Economy class offers a more spacious seat with footrest, upgraded dining and beverage options, an amenity kit, and airport business class lounge access.
- JetBlue: Even More Space (offers a minimum seat pitch of 38 in (97 cm), as well as both priority boarding and screening)
- KLM: Premium Comfort is offered on all Boeing 787 Dreamliners and select Boeing 777s, featuring wider seats with a movable leg- and footrest, 7.8 inches recline (20 cm) and a 38 in (97 cm) seat pitch.
- LATAM Brasil: Space Plus: Only on select Boeing 777s. Offers at least 36 in (91 cm) of seat pitch and more recline.
- LATAM Chile: Premium Economy: Only on Airbus A320 series planes. Provides more legroom, width, and recline, plus the middle seat is blocked out to allow more space.
- LOT Polish Airlines: Premium Club (long-haul only)
- Lufthansa: Premium Economy is available in all long-haul flights and features more spacious seats and upgraded dining.
- Mahan Air: Bigger seats and more legroom on Airbus A340s long haul flights
- Oman Air: All economy cabins are premium class with 36 in (91 cm) seat pitch
- Pakistan International Airlines: Executive Economy. Seats with more legroom and vacant middle seat are offered in Executive Economy on board the Airbus A320 aircraft.
- Philippine Airlines: Premium Economy (only on Airbus A321s, newer Airbus A330s and A350s. On PAL Express flights using two class Airbus A320s, the business class seats are sold as Premium Economy)
- Qantas: Premium Economy is available on Boeing 787s and Airbus A380s aircraft on selected routes.
- Riyadh Air: Premium Economy will be available on the Boeing 787s when they enter service.
- Scandinavian Airlines: SAS Plus (previously named Economy Extra, the features remain the same). Wider seats in 2–3–2 configurations and upgraded dining are available on their Asia and North America routes.
- Scoot: Super / Stretch seats (located in the first few rows and all bulkhead and exit rows in the economy cabin. Seats offer more width, 3–5 in (7.6–12.7 cm) more pitch and on Boeing 787s, adjustable headrests. These seats are distinguished be being a different colour that the standard economy seats in light blue and Super / Stretch seats in dark blue.)
- Singapore Airlines: Premium Economy class aboard all Airbus A350-900 (except Medium Haul configuration), Airbus A380-800, and Boeing 777-300ER aircraft, with service to Europe and the United States.
- SpiceJet: Premium economy (located in the first five rows and exit rows of all Boeing 737s, featuring a 36 in (91 cm) seat pitch, priority boarding and baggage handling and a larger baggage allowance, much like the SpiceMAX bundle)
- Sunwing Airlines: Elite Plus: Offers at least 6 in (15 cm) extra pitch, larger baggage allowance, and priority boarding, check-in and baggage handling.
- Thai Airways International: Premium Economy (only on Boeing 777-300ER routes to Copenhagen and Stockholm Arlanda). It uses same seat as Royal Silk Class (Business Class).
- Ukraine International Airlines: Premium Economy (only on Boeing 767s. Offers 36–37 in (91–94 cm) of pitch and a wider seat, plus priority ground service, better food options including a free glass of wine, and increased baggage allowance)
- United Airlines: United Premium Plus offers wider seats with more recline, extra legroom, alcoholic drinks, and upgraded dining. Economy Plus is offered on all flights.
- Vietnam Airlines: Premium Economy class is available on Airbus A350s and Boeing 787-9 aircraft on selected routes.
- Virgin Atlantic: Premium Economy class offers roomier seats, dedicated check-in counter, priority boarding, upgraded dining, among other perks. Available on international flights on A330, A350, and B-787-9 aircraft.
- Virgin Australia: Economy X. Economy X offers a more premium experience at the airport and onboard, within the affordability of economy class. Economy X includes extra legroom, Preferred overhead locker space (Virgin Australia operated flights only), Priority boarding and priority screening (where available).
- WestJet: Premium Class. On WestJet's 787, Premium Class is in a separate, dedicated cabin. Larger seats with greater recline are offered in a 2-3-2 configuration. Complimentary hot meals, alcoholic and non-alcoholic beverages are included. A self-serve social area is also available. On international flights, an amenity kit is provided. On WestJet's 737, Premium Class is separated from economy with sky dividers and curtain. Larger seats with greater recline are offered in a 2-2 configuration. Complimentary plated hot meals, alcoholic and non-alcoholic beverages are included.

Some airlines no longer offer premium economy:

- Olympic Air: If passengers were travelling aboard a Bombardier Dash-8, the seat next to them could remain empty upon their request. This service was branded as "Premium Economy Class" and cost more than normal economy class. Moreover, they could use premium check-in facilities, if available, and were offered a welcome drink on board. Aircraft other than the Dash 8 didn't offer Premium Economy, but Business Class, which was discontinued immediately after the airline's buyout. Premium Economy was discontinued after the airline buyout too, because of its similarities to the business class of the company who bought them, Aegean Airlines.
- South African Airways: SAA never had a designated Premium Economy cabin, but the upper decks of their Boeing 747-400 aircraft featured Economy Class seats with 35 in (89 cm) of legroom, compared to 31 in (79 cm) in the main cabin. However, these seats were very exclusive, because they were mainly reserved for Voyager Platinum and Star Alliance Gold passengers. The Boeing 747-400s were retired from SAA's fleet in 2010, and the Premium Economy product was retired as well. One version of their Airbus A350 offers an Economy Plus section with 5 in (13 cm) of extra seat pitch.

== See also ==
- First class (aviation)
- Hypermobility (travel)
- Deep vein thrombosis or traveller’s thrombosis, sometimes nicknamed "Economy class syndrome"
