= UIC franc =

Virtual currency of the International Union of Railways

ISO 4217
- Code: XFU

Demographics
- Date of introduction: 1976
- Replaced: Gold Franc
- Date of withdrawal: 1 January 1990 (Note: In practice.); November 2013 (Note: Formal.)
- Replaced by: Euro
- This infobox shows the latest status before this currency was rendered obsolete.

The UIC Franc (code: XFU) was a virtual currency unit used by the International Union of Railways (UIC). It was introduced in 1976 after the Gold Franc was abandoned for this purpose due to instability of the international monetary system, and was replaced by the European Currency Unit on 1 January 1990.

The code XFU was not withdrawn from the ISO-4217 currency list until 2013, despite the UIC franc having long fallen out of use.

== See also ==
- Private currency
- Neutral Unit of Construction (NUC) – a related currency for the airline ticketing industry
