= Travel class =

Quality of accommodation on public transport

A typical wide-body jet plane seat plan (Asiana Boeing 747-400)

A travel class is a quality of accommodation on public transport. The accommodation could be a seat or a cabin for example. Higher travel classes are designed to be more comfortable and are typically more expensive.

== Airlines ==
Traditionally, an airliner is divided into, from the fore to aft, first, business, and economy classes, sometimes referred to as cabins. In recent years, some airlines have added a premium economy class as an intermediate class between economy and business classes. Full double-deck aircraft like the Airbus A380 usually feature the former two and premium economy on the top deck, and economy on the main deck, while the 747 features first class suites at the nose section, business class on the upper deck, and economy everywhere else.

Each class is further divided into invisible booking or fare classes, which although booked into the same cabin differ in conditions and benefits outside of the cabin class travelled, such as frequent-flyer points, baggage limit, change or refund policy, etc.

== Ocean liners ==
Before cruise ships dominated the passenger ship trade, ocean liners had classes of service, often categorized as First Class, Second Class, and Steerage. Companies such as Cunard Line continue this tradition, offering Queen's Grill, Princess Grill and Britannia cabins, each of which have their own allocated lounges and restaurants on board.

== Trains ==
Trains often have first class (the higher class) and second class (known as standard class in the UK). For trains with sleeping accommodations, there may be more levels of luxury.

=== China ===
Traditional trains commonly offer the following classes: soft sleeper, hard sleeper, soft seat and hard seat, depending on the route.

China Railway High-speed (CRH) EMUs offer the following classes: soft sleeper (available only on few overnight routes), business seat, 1st class seat and 2nd class seat.

=== Taiwan ===
Prior to 1949, most railway bureaus (under the direction of the Transport Ministry) had a three-class structure. As with most contemporary cases, few people could afford first class or even second class, so at times there would be no first class or second class service available in some trains. Some went as far as offering a fourth class "service" with goods wagons.

In 1949, the first "Limited Express with Reserved Seating" (特快對號車) appeared with the Railway Bureau of Taiwan, and it offered a three-class service, inherited locally from Japanese colonial rule. This structure was the norm for all trains, normal or express, until 1953.

In 1953, the "Equality Express" was introduced with second class carriages only. Eventually, all expresses save for the sole Limited Express offered only second class service, and all other, slower trains, offered only third class. This resulted in the quality of service being associated with the speed of the train. The Diesel Limited Express was introduced in 1956 with one class only.

In 1960, with the reforming of Limited Expresses (the Limited Express with Reserved Seating and Diesel Limited Express merged into one fare), all passenger trains officially offered only one class. Therefore, all expresses had only second class carriages and other trains only third class. As time passes, more types of carriages were introduced, but these were thought as types instead of classes.

=== Europe ===
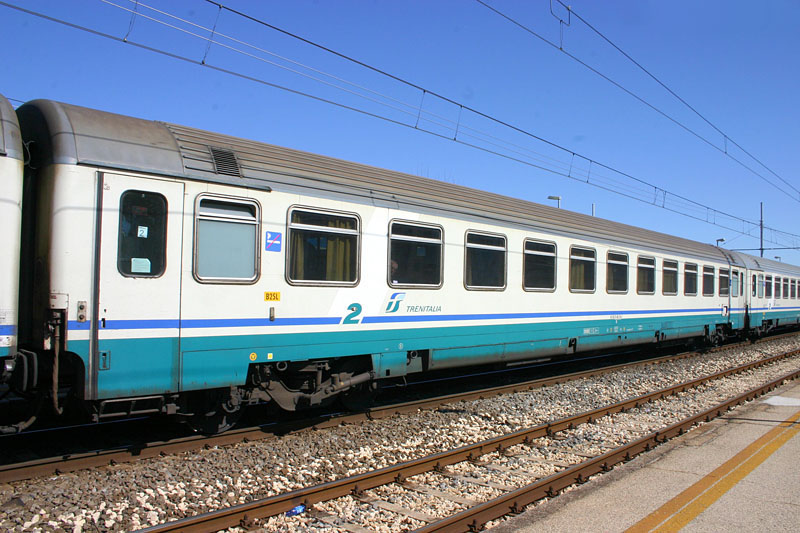
Italian passenger carriage, showing a "2" denoting second class

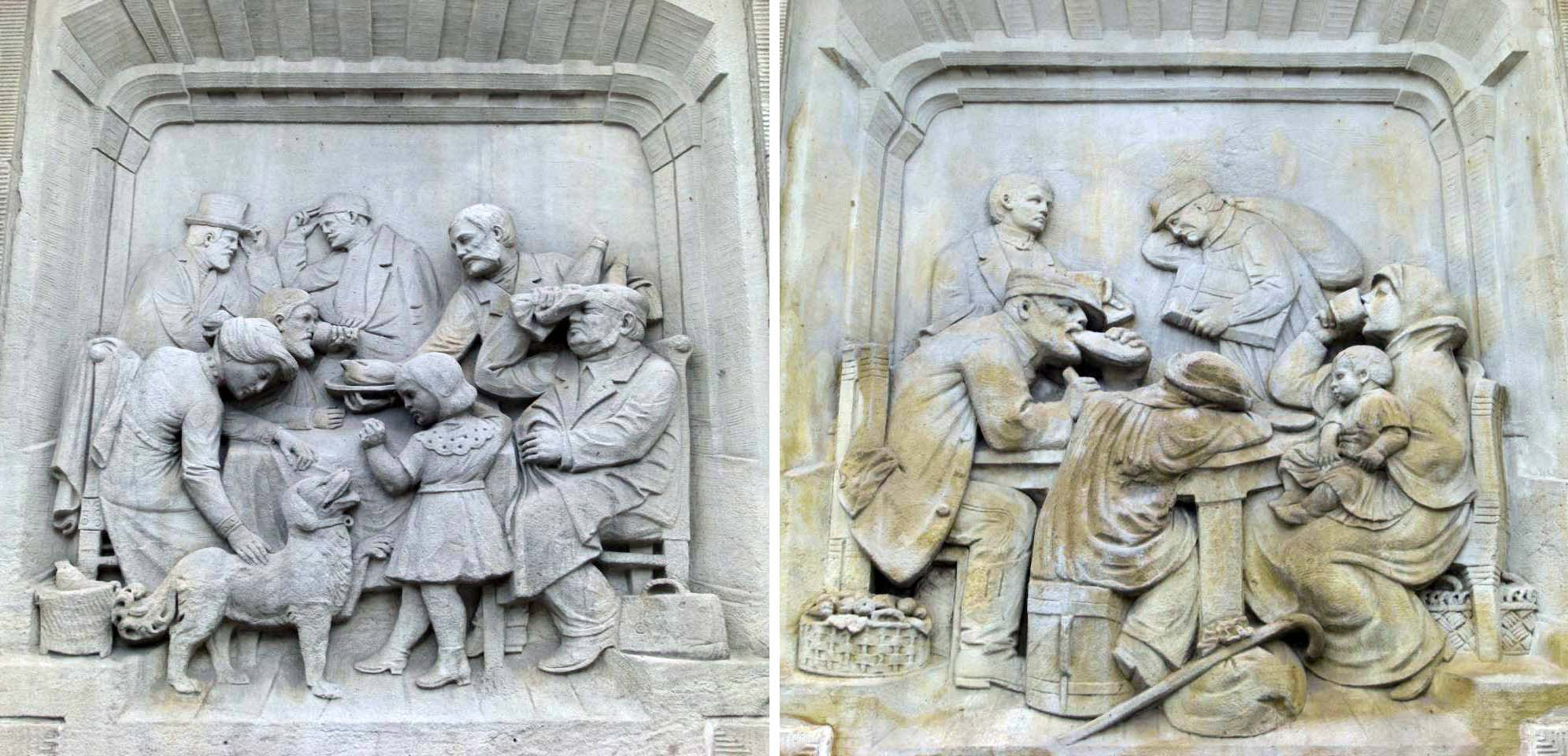
Travel class illustrations at the beginning of the 20th century. Representations of the station restaurants of the first and second classes (left) and third class (right). Reliefs of the Iml train station of Metz, France.

At the very beginning of the railway age in Europe, almost every railway operator offered three classes for passenger services: "First class" was the most luxurious and least demanded class, equipped with rich upholstered seats, while "second class" was also upholstered, but on a lower level and with less seating space. In contrast, "third class" only provided wooden benches. While most passenger trains carried just one or two "first class" and "second class" carriages, every other carriage was "third class" only.

Today there are generally two classes, known as "first class" and "second class" or "economy class", or the equivalent in the local language. In the United Kingdom (UK), the Midland Railway abolished its "second class" in 1875, offering only "first class" and "third class" travel. In fact, it was the basic wood-seated "third class" carriages and compartments which were removed, with "third class" passengers now travelling in what had been "second class" but at the original lower price. At the same time, the Midland reduced the cost of its "first class" tickets to the prices previously charged for "second class". This move attracted many more passengers to Midland trains and other railway companies were pressured to follow. By the end of the 19th century, virtually all British trains consisted of only two classes (still called "first" and "third", both with fully upholstered (and lit and heated) seating arrangements. The exceptions were some "third class" trains provided for workmen under the Cheap Trains Act 1883 which retained wooden benches for ease of cleaning, and boat trains connecting with ferries and trains to continental Europe, where three travel classes on trains were still the norm and so continued to provide "first", "second" and "third" class accommodation, although the "third class" accommodation remained broadly equivalent to "second class" on other European trains.

The three-tier class structure was abolished on most European railways by the end of the 1950s in favor of a two-tier structure conceived by the UIC. In fact, the old "first class" from the pre-World-War-II era was deleted without substitution because of low ridership in postwar times, therefore the old "second class" became the new "first class" and the "third class", with hardly any wooden seatings left, was declared the new "second class".

Trains in the UK continued to provide a two-tier class structure, with the higher tier called "first class". The lower tier was re-branded from "third class" to "second class" by British Rail from 3 June 1956, and then to "standard class" from 11 May 1987.

A convention used by most European railway companies is that the first-class section of a train is marked in yellow, usually with a yellow band above the doors and/or windows. First-class areas may be complete carriages or at one end of a carriage, the other end being second class. Second-class compartments usually have "2+2" seating (2 seats each side of the aisle); first-class compartments are typically "2+1". In Britain and France, some short-distance suburban trains use "2+3" for the lower class and "2+2" for first class.

Metro, suburban and local trains are sometimes second-class-only. First-class-only trains were common up to the 1980s (see Trans Europe Express) but since the withdrawal of TEE services in 1995 are now rare. High-speed trains often charge more than slower-speed trains on the same route, but still have first- and second-class seats.

Trains in Ireland are primarily operated as standard-class only, with only some of the longest distance services having a higher class, called Premier on IE 22000 Class stock, CityGold on Mark 4 loco-hauled carriages and First Plus on the cross-border Enterprise service. No commuter services have premium classes. Premium benefits can be as limited as a reading light and waiter service; but reach to 2+1 recliner seating and enhanced catering options.

In Germany, there existed a "fourth class" ("4. Klasse") on almost every local train from the second half of the 19th century to 1928. It provided just a very low travel comfort, the passengers had to sit on even wooden planks with rudimentary backrests. Much of the space in the compartments was left empty to allow country folks to carry their goods and livestock inside the carriage.

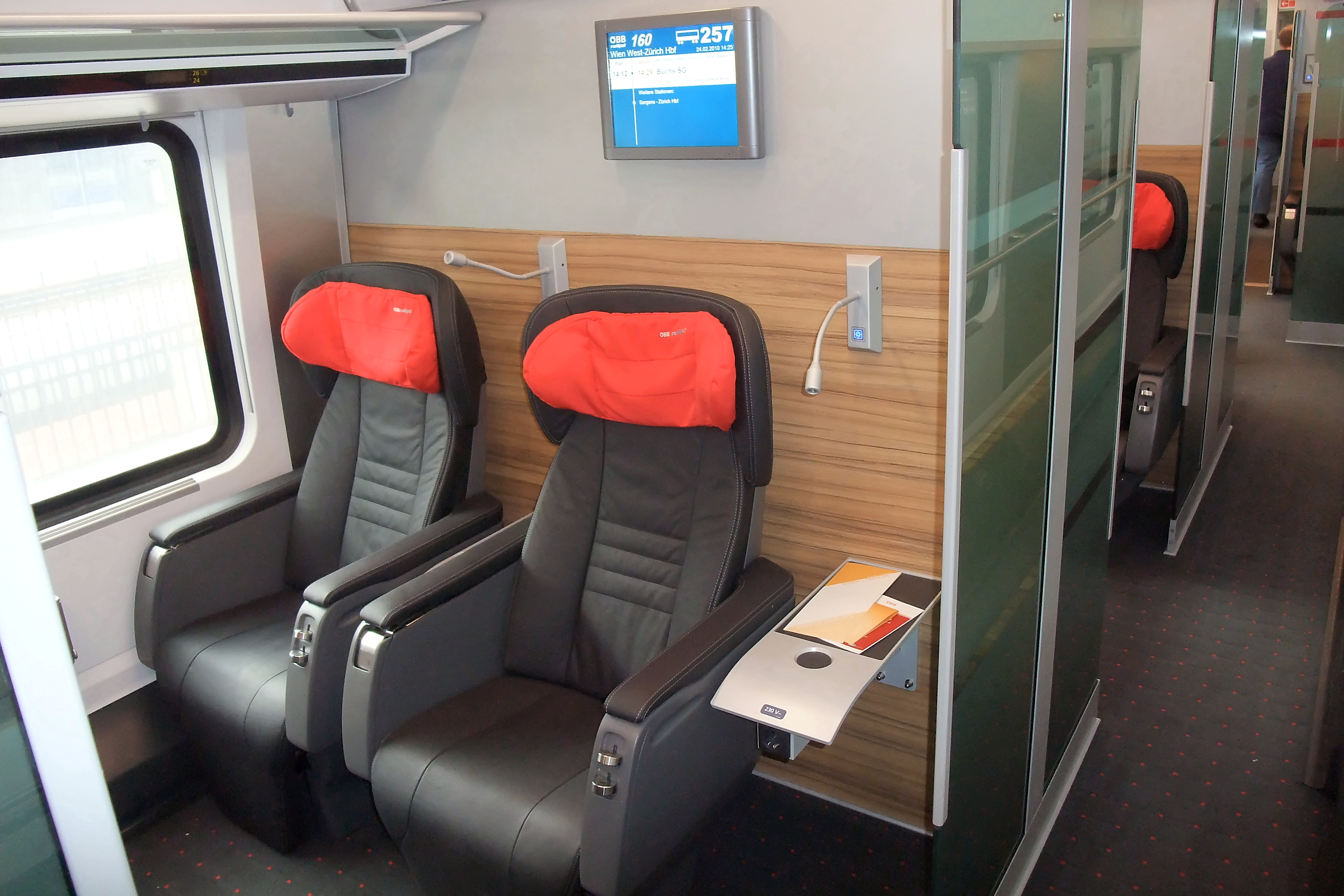
The highest class of seating available on the ÖBB Railjet

In Austria (and the adjacent countries also served by it) the Railjet has gone back to a three class structure with the highest class of service titled "Business Class".

=== India ===
The Indian Railways offers six classes of train accommodation in general.

- First Class A/C (1A) is the highest rail travel class and is not available on all trains. It offers air-conditioned cubicles in two-bed and four-bed formats with closing doors. There usually is only one 1A bogie (carriage) on a train.
- Two Tier A/C (2A) offers air conditioned cubicles in four-bed + two-bed format, but the privacy is provided by curtains instead of the doors found in 1A. There are typically one or two 2A bogies on long-distance trains.
- Three Tier A/C (3A) offers air conditioned cubicles in six-bed + two-bed format (six beds on one side and two beds on other side of the hallway). Most trains have two to five 3A bogies.
- A/C Chair Car (CC) is a feature of short-distance trains that cover the journey within a day. The seating is usually in 3x3 format.
- Sleeper Class (SL) is configured similarly to 3A but is not air conditioned. There are typically ten to fifteen SL bogies in a train.
- Second Class (Reserved) (2S) similar as CC, without the air-conditioning. These may be reserved in advance or may be unreserved.
- Second Class (II) for long-distance trains is similar to the SL cars but has wooden middle berths instead of upper berths. However, local and suburban trains may offer a different variety of second class, which has an open cabin with rows of wooden seats facing each other in pairs.

Some trains also have one of these classes:

- Third AC Economy (3E). Similar to Three Tier A/C, however this class have an additional middle berth in the side section of the air conditioned cubicle, making it a six-bed and three-bed format. This type of accommodation is created for less well off people, who desire a comfortable travel at lesser fare.
- First Class (FC), which is similar in configuration to the 1A class but lacks air conditioning. The class is currently being phased out in favor of the slightly expensive 2A and cheaper 3A classes. In 2011, it could be found only on Mumbai local train and a few trains across all of India.
- Executive AC Chair Car (EC), has a 2x2 seat configuration and includes food catering service. It is available only on the "Shatabdi Express" and "Tejas Express" trains, which link major cities located within a day-trip distance.

=== Indonesia ===
Indonesian trains, operated by the state-owned PT Kereta Api Indonesia (the Indonesian Railways Co.), have now four classes for long-distance travel. All types of carriages are seating-only (no sleeper cars).

- Executive/first class (eksekutif)–the top and most expensive class, offers the most comfortable means of travel - 2–2 reclining seat configuration, on-board TV. Executive-class carriages are classified by the Ministry of Transportation as K1. Also, trains having Eksekutif cars are certainly the fastest ones – see the note below.
  - Argo class – this is the top class that all of train names use Argo brand.
  - Fauna class – below the Argos.
- Business/second class (bisnis)–medium class, the fare is around 60% of executive classes, 2–2 seating, fixed 60 degrees seat. Business-class carriages are classified by the Ministry of Transportation as K2. The Indonesian Railways is phasing out this class.
- Premium economy class–the intermediate level between the business and economy classes, the fare is nearly same as business, 2-2 reclining seat configuration.
- Economy/third class (ekonomi)–the lowest and cheapest class, below the premium class tickets are around 20% of business classes. Economy-class carriages are classified by the Ministry of Transportation as K3.
  - Commercial economy class, 2-2 seat configuration
  - PSO economy class, 3-2 seat configuration, with split-type air conditioned (retrofitted from fans)

All classes are non-smoking and air conditioned. All passengers require a seat reservation, except for commuter trains. All seats can be reserved from 30 to 90 days before travel date until minutes before departure time when seats are still available. Medium and long-distance trains have onboard cafeteria, flushing toilets (older passenger coaches have squatting toilets), onboard customer service representative (Train Manager), onboard security, and onboard cleaning services.

Executive class trains are the fastest and stop only on a few major stations (first priority). Business trains are somewhat slower, but generally do not stop too often as well there may be economy cars in these trains (second priority). Economy trains take significantly more time to reach the destination, as they stop on many smaller stations and have to pass all executive and business class traffic going in the same direction (third priority). Many less important routes lack either business or executive service, or both. Some services have more two or three classes mixed together (executive-business, executive-economy, executive-premium economy, or executive-business-economy).

For local or commuter trains, single class service is the most common type of service. But in some areas there may be other classes as well which have different seating arrangement and travel time in which the lower classes has more stops than the upper one. For example, Jogjakarta–Solo route there are Sriwedari train services which is air conditioned and has transverse seating and also Prambanan Express train which is non air conditioned, has longitudinal seating and more stops. Meanwhile, in Jakarta metropolitan area, there's only one class of service available since mid-2013 which is air conditioned and has longitudinal seating; however, a tradition that started in the mid-90s made it customary for commuter trains to be technically classified as executive-class trains. Commuter trains in Jakarta are operated by Kereta Commuter Indonesia, a subsidiary of the Indonesian Railways Co.

=== Japan ===
From 1872, Japan had a three-class structure for both seating carriages and sleeping carriages. By 1960, as conditions improved on second and third class trains, there were few passengers travelling on first class; therefore, the few remaining first class carriages were rebranded "special" carriages available for hire, and consequently moved Japan's railway system to a two-class system, of which the original second class became the first, and the original third became second.

In 1969, the class structure was abolished altogether. The first class was renamed "Green" carriages and the second "Standard" carriages.

All members of the Japan Railways Group (JR) offer separated classes of travel, with varying levels of availability on any given train.

The Kyushu Railway Company (JR Kyūshū), Hokkaido Railway Company (JR Hokkaido), and East Japan Railway Company (JR East) all offer an enhanced service known as the Green Car on nearly all of their intercity trains. Additionally, the Central Japan Railway Company (JR Central) and Shikoku Railway Company (JR Shikoku) offer a Green Car on some trains, and a few West Japan Railway Company (JR West) trains also have a Green Car. The alternative to Green Car is the Ordinary Car. Although Ordinary Car tickets may be purchased with or without reserved seating, all Green Car tickets are reserved seating. A ticket must be purchased in advance, and a special version of the Japan Rail Pass allowing travel in Green Cars is available.

Most JR Group Green Cars seats have increased width and pitch. In some stations, Green Cars are located nearer to the staircases and escalators leading to/from the train platform. Green Cars also frequently offer slippers and reading materials in Japanese.

Additionally, JR East offers a third category of service, the GranClass, available on its Hayabusa route. Features of GranClass cars include leather seats that recline to a 45-degree angle, raised footrests, adjustable dining tables and cocktail trays, and personal reading lights. Full-service meals, both Japanese and Western, are provided by specialized GranClass attendants, who also serve soft drinks and alcoholic beverages. Because the Hayabusa is a long-distance service to the Tōhoku region, overnight amenities such as slippers, blankets, and eye masks are provided.

=== Great Britain ===
During the Victorian era, most trains in the United Kingdom had three classes of accommodation: first class, second class and third class. From 1875, when the Midland Railway redesignated its second class accommodation as third class, second class (equivalent to either premium economy or business class) was gradually abolished, while first class and third class were retained. This was because the Railway Regulation Act 1844 required a third-class service to be offered. In addition to this, British third class was initially of a comparable standard to continental European third class and British first class with European first class (the continent having retained three classes). This meant that boat trains in Britain still often operated with three classes of accommodation after the abolition of second class in the rest of the country. From 3 June 1956 British Railways redesignated third class as "second class", finally (as British Rail) renaming it "standard class" from 11 May 1987, in view of the pejorative overtones of "second class".

A coach with accommodation for more than one class is called a "composite coach".

=== North America ===
In the United States and Canada, train classes emulate the airlines, although airlines probably took the class levels from trains of the time when they were coming of age (e.g. first, business, coach). Amtrak Acela Express trains have two classes: First Class and Business Class. Amtrak Northeast Regional trains have Business Class and Coach class. Canada's Via Rail has the same classes as Amtrak. Trains with sleeper cars have additional levels. Commuter trains rarely offer multiple classes of service.

== Trams ==
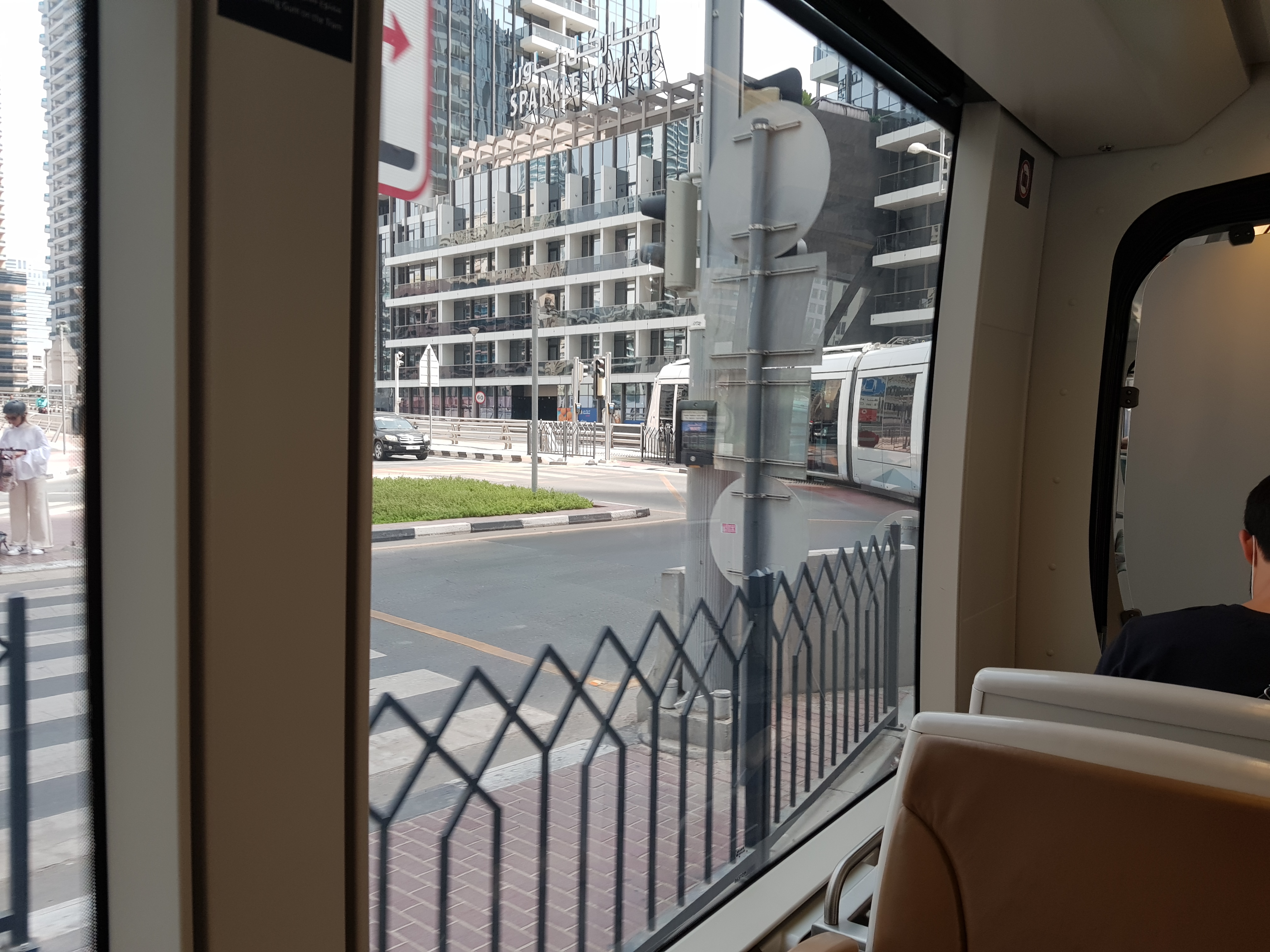
Dubai Tram Gold Section

Dubai Tram, UAE has Gold Class for first class travel.

== See also ==
- First class (aviation)
- First class travel
- Business class
- Premium economy
- Economy class
- Passenger car (rail)
- IATA class codes
