= Infini (CRS) =

Infini is a computer reservations system based in Japan which provides its services in the Japanese market. It was created in 1990 by All Nippon Airways and Abacus (GDS) who currently own 100% of Infini. It utilises technology from Sabre Holdings to provide booking and ticketing capabilities to travel agencies in Japan.

== See also ==
- Airline reservations system
