= EMD =

EMD may refer to:

== Finance and commerce ==
- Earnest money deposit, in the United States, a security deposit, especially for real estate

== Medicine ==
- Electromagnetic diaphragm
- Electromechanical dissociation
- Emergency medical dispatcher
- Enamel matrix derivative
- Esophageal motility disorder
- Merck Group, known as EMD in Canada and the United States, a German pharmaceutical company

== Science and technology ==
- Electrolytic manganese dioxide
- Emerin
- Empirical mode decomposition
- Equilibrium mode distribution
- ReadyBoost, disk-caching software

== Transport ==
- East Midlands Parkway railway station, in England
- Electro-Motive Diesel, an American locomotive manufacturer
- Electronic Miscellaneous Document in the airline industry
- Emerald Airport, in Queensland, Australia

== Other uses ==
- Schneider Electric EMD an Armenian-Serbian electric company
- EMD (band), a Swedish band
- Earth mover's distance
- European Marketing Distribution, a European purchasing organization for grocery stores
- European Maritime Day
- Engineering and Manufacturing Development, a U.S. defense acquisition phase associated with detailed design and subsequent testing to verify requirements; previously called Full-Scale Development (FSD)
