= Open-jaw ticket =

Airline ticket

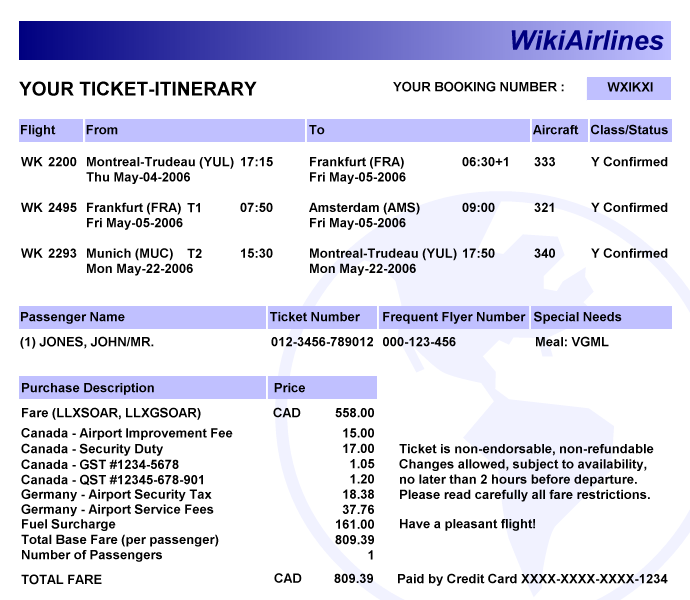
A sample itinerary for an open jaw electronic ticket from Montreal to Amsterdam, and returning from Munich

An open-jaw ticket is an airline return ticket where the destination and/or the origin are not the same in both directions. The name is derived from how it looks when drawn on a map.

== Types ==
There are three types:

- Destination open-jaw, where a passenger flies from one city to another, but returns to the original city from a different place. For example, depart London to New York, but on the return trip fly from Philadelphia to London.
- Origin open-jaw, where the passenger leaves from one city to another but returns to a different place. For example, flying from London to New York, but returning from New York to Manchester.
- Double open-jaw, where two totally separate fares exist. For example, flying from London to New York, but on the return trip flying from Boston to Manchester.

Using different airports in the same city is not considered an open-jaw, so a passenger on a London to JFK trip who returned from Newark would still be a simple round trip as both airports are considered to be serving metropolitan New York City.

== ARNK ==
The open gaps between the cities show on the itinerary as ARNK, the same code that shows on an airline or agency's Global Distribution System. The term (pronounced arunk) means "arrival unknown".

The reason for this is that airline reservation systems (and major GDSs) require the segments following on sequentially, so arriving at one city, and then departing from another, will cause the system to return an error message. The ARNK field tells the system that this is intentional, and also allows for the ticketing system to blank the unused coupons of a ticket.

A typical destination open-jaw would look like this on an itinerary, with the ARNK on the second segment to show that it is not being flown on that ticket.

- Segment 1: 11-NOV: SFO/IAD (San Francisco to Washington-Dulles)
- Segment 2: ARNK: Arrival Unknown or Surface Transportation from IAD to PHL
- Segment 3: 15-NOV: PHL/SFO (Philadelphia to San Francisco)

== Reasons for using open-jaw tickets ==
In some cases, this type of arrangement is needed for boat cruises that do not return to the departure city. In other cases, the traveller wishes to explore between two points and using alternative transport (e.g. buses, trains, ferries or flights on another ticket). For example, a traveller might fly from London to Bangkok, travel around Thailand by public transport and fly back home to London from Phuket. Another example would be a traveller flying from New York City to London, travelling around different countries in Europe by taking buses / trains or low-cost carrier flights, then returning from Vilnius. Open-jaw tickets are a flexible and relatively inexpensive way of flying as they are priced as a round-trip ticket, in most cases less expensive than purchasing two one-way flights between the destinations visited.

Another market commonly traveled under an open-jaw itinerary is the one of local one-way tours. Take, for example, a tour of Florida, where a traveler flying into Jacksonville, Orlando, or Miami rents a car or joins a bus tour at their arrival airport, and returns the car or ends the tour in the town from which they will be flying home.

== Restrictions ==
Some routing restrictions can apply to open-jaw tickets. The most common restriction is that the open-jaw segments must be shorter than the flown segments. In some circumstances, the destination and return origin must be in the same IATA region, or may be restricted to the same country.

== See also ==
- Airline booking ploys
