= Ancillary revenue =

Type of revenue

Ancillary revenue is revenue that is derived from goods or services other than a company's primary product offering. Examples include concessions at sporting events, baggage handling or seat selection revenue received by airlines, restaurant revenue received by hotel owners, and car-wash services sold by gas stations. Ancillary revenue may exceed primary revenues, leading to changes in business models.

== Airline industry ==
In the airline industry, ancillary revenue is revenue from non-ticket sources, such as baggage fees and on-board food and services.

Airline ancillary revenue was estimated to be $92.9 billion worldwide in 2018. In the first half of 2018, ancillary revenue at Ryanair rose 28%. United Airlines is the leader in dollar volume of ancillary revenue.

=== 2006 figures ===
The following lists total ancillary revenue reported by these airlines for fiscal year 2006: easyJet €189,476,508, Aer Lingus €63,407,000, SkyEurope €10,827,000, AirAsia (Malaysia) €22,713,479.

According to a study published by Amadeus IT Group and IdeaWorksCompany, airlines’ ancillary revenues were projected to increase from $13.5 billion in 2009 to $22.6 billion in 2010. In 2009, United Airlines had $1.5 billion in ancillary revenues; for many airlines ancillary revenues accounted for a huge part of their total revenues: Allegiant Air (29.2%), Spirit Airlines (23.9%) and Ryanair (22.2%). For 2018, the financial results have greatly increased with the following top performers noted:

- The top “% of revenue” producer for Europe & Russia was Wizz Air at 41.1%, for the Americas was Viva Aerobus at 47.6%, for Asia & South Pacific, AirAsia at 29%; the Middle East/Africa region did not make the top 10 ranking.
- The top performing US-based airlines as a group achieved revenue of more than $17.5 billion from frequent flyer programs, that’s an average of $25 per passenger.
- Top “ancillary revenue per passenger,” mostly from a la carte activities, by global regions: Jet2.com $43.91 (Europe & Russia), Spirit $50.94 (Americas), and Virgin Australia $34.74 (Asia & South Pacific). The Middle East/Africa region did not make the top 10 ranking.

=== Passenger reaction ===
Airlines can use product differentiation and potentially boost their revenues by "unbundling" the travel experience by charging separate fees for services such as checked baggage and beverages served on board. Low cost carriers such as easyJet and Ryanair have generated significant profit from ancillary revenue. However, the consumer backlash from charging fees (for services included in the price of a ticket by other airlines) can damage a carrier's reputation. For example, "European Skyway Robbery" was the headline written by noted travel columnist Peter Greenberg to warn consumers of abusive overcharging for baggage fees in Europe by easyJet and other carriers. British Airways also wanted to boost its ancillary revenue with higher baggage fees during 2007. The carrier eventually backed down after the public outcry became too great.

=== Types of ancillary revenue ===
According to IdeaWorksCompany in its annually produced CarTrawler Yearbook of Ancillary Revenue, ancillary revenue for airlines includes: à la carte features, commission-based products, frequent flier activities, advertising sold by the airline, and fare or product bundles.

- A la carte features are separate amenities a consumer can order while travelling. The list includes:
  - onboard sales of food and beverages
  - checking of baggage and excess baggage - $28.1 billion (2018), $23.6 billion (2017) $13.4 billion (2014).
  - assigned seats or better seats such as aisle seats
  - call center support for reservations
  - fees charged for purchases made with credit cards
  - early boarding benefits
- Commission-based products refers to sales of products and services such as hotel accommodations, car rentals and travel insurance for sales commission. These primarily involves the airline’s web site, but it can include the sale of duty-free and consumer products on board aircraft.
- Frequent flyer programs are defined by the sale of miles or points to program partners such as hotel chains and car rental companies, co-branded credit cards (co-branding), online malls, retailers, and communication services. The amounts can be significant, such as the disclosures made by the top 5 revenue-producing carriers for 2018: $1,144,803,233 (Qantas Group), $5,571,000,000 (American Airlines), $4,229,000,000 (United Airlines), $3,407,000,000 (Southwest Airlines), and $4,110,000,000 (Delta Air Lines). (2018 carrier results were based upon recent 12-month financial period disclosures. Local currencies converted to US dollars at July 2018 rates of exchange).
- Airline-sold advertising relates to revenue from the sale of advertising in in-flight magazines and other customer communication channels (including advertising on the aircraft interior or exterior, or in airport or lounge facilities, as well as advertising on airlines' in-flight entertainment service.
- Fare or Product Bundle - Airlines may allocate a portion of the price associated with an economy class bundle or product bundle as ancillary revenue. This is determined by assigning a revenue value to the services included in the bundle, such as checked baggage, early boarding, and extra leg room seating.

== Hotel industry ==
Ancillary revenue in the hotel industry includes revenue from high speed WiFi, in-room dining, parking, business services, meals, fees for extra loyalty points, late checkout/early check-in fees, in-room entertainment, and trip cancellation insurance.
