= Passenger service system =

Management software used by airlines

A Passenger Service System or PSS is a network of software applications that help airlines manage all the passenger-related operations from ticketing to boarding. The PSS usually comprises an airline reservations system, an airline inventory system and a departure control system (DCS).

== Modules ==
Generally the PSS is made up of modules that are used to manage different parts of the airline’s business.

=== Airline Reservations system ===
The airline reservations system is the system that allows an airline to sell their inventory (seats). It contains information on schedules and fares and contains a database of reservations (or passenger name records) and of tickets issued (if applicable).

=== Airline Inventory System ===
The airline inventory system may or may not be integrated with the reservation system. The system contains all the airline’s flights and the available seats. The main function of the inventory system is to define how many seats are available on a particular flight by opening or closing an individual booking class in accordance with rules defined by the airline.

=== Departure Control System ===
The departure control system (DCS) is the system used by airlines and airports to check-in a passenger. The DCS is connected to the reservation system enabling it to check who has a valid reservation on a flight. The DCS is used to enter information required by customs or border security agencies and to issue the boarding document. In addition the DCS may also be used to dispatch cargo and to optimize aircraft weight and balance.
