= Neutral unit of construction =

neutral unit of construction
Unit
- Symbol: NUC

The neutral unit of construction or neutral unit of currency (code: NUC) is a private currency used by the airline industry, to record fare calculation information. A set of exchange rates is issued by the International Air Transport Association (IATA) every month. The ticket component prices are converted from the original currency (of the country of commencement of travel) and recorded on the airline ticket.

The NUC system came into being on 1 July 1989, having superseded the older "Fare Construction Unit" (FCU) system. As of 2008, the NUC depends on the COC (Country of Commencement) of the travel. Each country that has a strong currency has an IROE (IATA Rate of Exchange) too.

A similar unit, formerly used by the European railway industry, is the UIC Franc (XFU).
