= First class (aviation) =

Commercial passenger travel service level in aviation

First class (also sometimes branded as a suite) is a travel class on some passenger airliners intended to be more luxurious than business class, premium economy, and economy class. Originally, all planes offered only one class of service (often equivalent to the modern business or economy class), with a second class appearing first in 1955 when TWA introduced two different types of service on its Super Constellations.

On a passenger jetliner, first class usually refers to a limited number (rarely more than 10) of seats or cabins toward the front of the aircraft which have more space and comfort, including better service and increased privacy. In general, first class is the highest class offered, although some airlines have either branded their new products as above first class or offered business class as the highest class. Propeller airliners often had first class in the rear, away from the noise of the engine and propeller, while a first class on jet aircraft is normally positioned near the front of the aircraft, often in front of the business class section or on the upper deck of certain wide-body aircraft such as the Boeing 747 and Airbus A380.

== History ==
As aeroplanes became larger, and flights more frequent, airlines came to appreciate that if they offered lower fares, they would get more customers on their planes. Initially, this was accomplished by the introduction of lower prices for the addition of some stops on the route. At the time, domestic fare prices in the United States were regulated by the Civil Aeronautics Board. In addition, the prices for international fares were controlled by the International Air Transport Association. Originally, the CAB allowed only a single fare to be charged for a flight, but after the IATA allowed the first "tourist fare" in the summer of 1952, the CAB changed its rules to allow different fare levels, still in a one-cabin style. In 1955, first in the world, TWA introduced the concept of different service standards for the different fares, marking the start of two-class planes, with the better-service fare generally called First Class and the other being termed Coach Class.

== Service ==
=== Overview ===
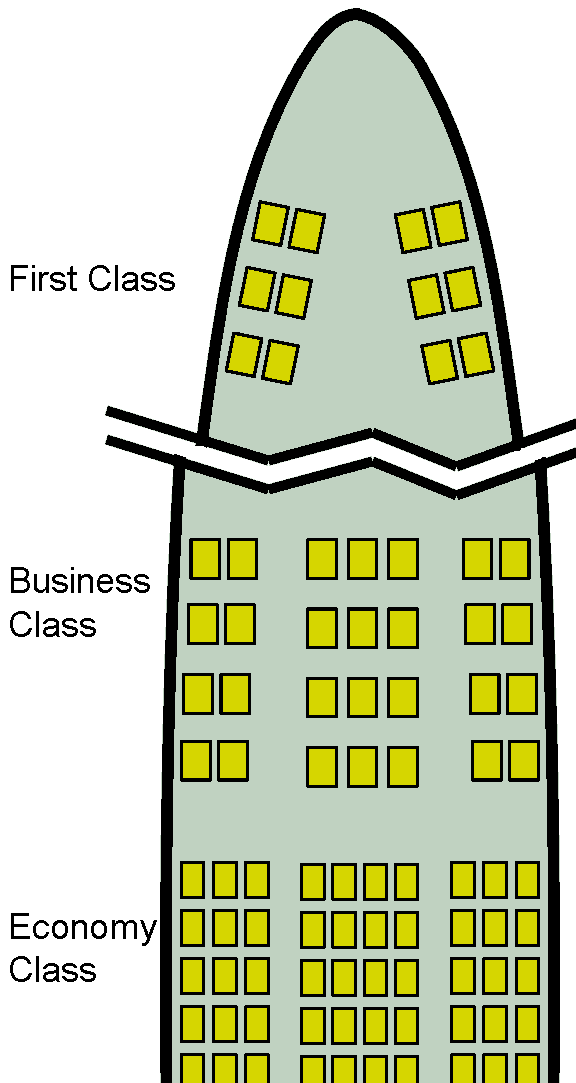
Example seating breakdown of a Boeing 777 airliner

First class seats vary from large reclining seats with more legroom and width than other classes to suites with a fully reclining seat, workstation and TV surrounded by privacy dividers. International first class seats usually have 147‍–‍239 cm (58–94 inches) of seat pitch and 48‍–‍89 cm (19–35 inches) of width while domestic flights may have 86–173 cm (34–68 inches) of pitch and 46–56 cm (18–22 inches) in width. Some airlines have first class seats which allow passengers to let one guest sit for a short time while face-to-face with the occupant of the cabin.

First class passengers usually have at least one lavatory for their exclusive use, with more than one on larger planes. Business and economy class passengers are not normally permitted in the first class cabin. Normally, AVOD (audiovisual on demand) entertainment is offered; although, sometimes, normal films, television programmes and interactive games are provided on medium‍–‍large seat-back or armrest-mounted flat panel monitors. Especially for long-haul and high-yielding routes on top airlines, a first class seat may have facilities akin to a luxury hotel, such as a minibar and an on-board lounge, in the case of Emirates first class suites.

Since the 1990s, a trend developed in which many airlines eliminated first class sections in favour of an upgraded business class. Newer business class seating is increasing adding features previously exclusive to first class such as convertible lie-flat seats, narrowing the amenities gap to an extent that first class is redundant. Furthermore, with the late 2000s recession, airlines have removed or not installed first class seating in their aircraft, as first class seats are usually double the price of business class but can take up more than twice the room, leaving business class the most expensive seats on such planes. However some, such as Garuda Indonesia, have opted to reintroduce first class seating sections with new aircraft.

=== Suites ===
With business class seating moving upmarket, some airlines are reintroducing or modelling their first class sections as suites. Singapore Airlines now markets the highest class on its A380s as "suites", with the tagline "A class above first." The 2 m (78 inches) bed is separate from the seat and folds out from the back wall, with several other components of the suite lowering to accommodate the mattress. Windows are built into the doors and blinds offer privacy. Suites located in the centre can form a double bed after the privacy blinds between them are retracted into the ceiling. Other A380 operators like Emirates also have a suite-like first class with similar amenities but the bed and chair are integrated where a button is pushed to turn the seat into a bed in seconds and vice versa. Etihad Airways introduced a three-room suite called "The Residence" in December 2014 when it added the Airbus A380 to its fleet. The Residence includes its own bedroom with a double bed, dining/living area and fully functional shower. This style of suite was set to be permanently retired in 2021 as a result of the COVID-19 pandemic leading Etihad to store its A380 fleet, but were reinstated with the return of the A380 to in service in 2023. In many cases, it is becoming difficult to distinguish newer Business Class Suite products from what is generally perceived as First Class.

=== Domestic first class ===
==== In North America ====
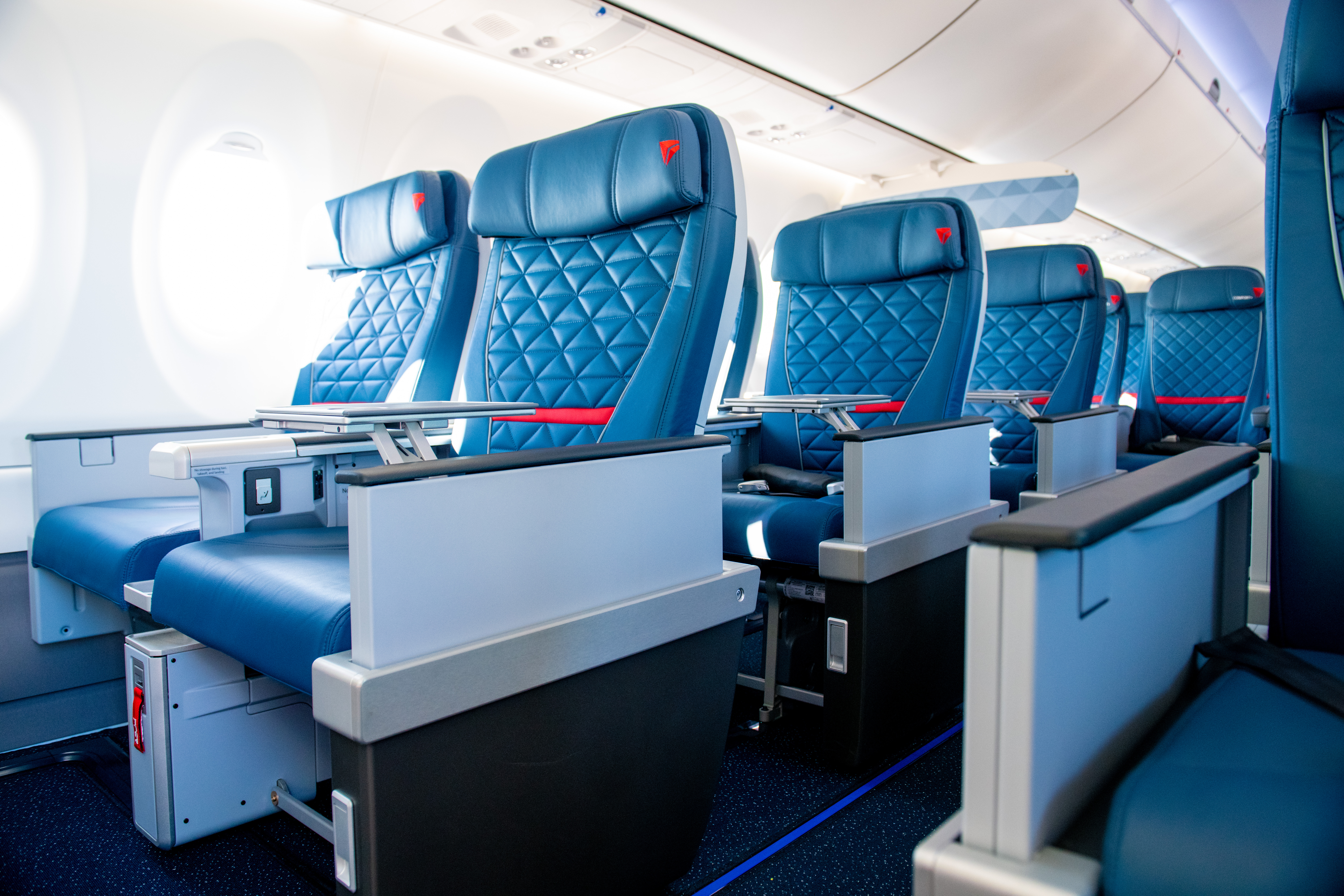
Delta Air Lines domestic first class aboard an Airbus A220

On most flights within or between the United States (including Alaska but not Hawaii), Canada, Mexico and the Caribbean – what is normally regarded as a regional business class in the rest of the world is branded as "domestic first class" by US airlines. The service is generally a step below long-haul international business class. US territories in the Western Pacific (Guam and the CNMI) and sometimes Hawaii are considered international for service purposes and generally feature long-haul business class.

However, domestic first class does have two very different meanings on certain transcontinental routes between New York City and California. Delta, American, United, and JetBlue operate a special service on flights between John F. Kennedy International Airport and San Francisco International Airport or Los Angeles International Airport known as "Delta Transcontinental Service," "American flagship service", "United p.s." (p.s. stands for premium service), and "Mint," respectively, with Delta and United using specially configured Boeing 757-200s and American and JetBlue using Airbus A321s. In the case of American Airlines, first class is actually a three-cabin first class which is different from two-cabin first class, both in comfort and price (such as lie-flat seats in first class, for example). In these cases, domestic business class is generally slightly higher than a two-cabin domestic first class ticket. The three-cabin first class is more of a truly first class rather than a rebranded business class. On JetBlue however, first class is only offered on transcontinental flights, consisting of mini- suites or lie-flat seats.

US discount carriers (such as Southwest and Frontier) do not have first class cabins, instead opting for an all-economy layout, sometimes with a few select rows with extra legroom (such as bulkhead and emergency row seats) available for a fee.

==== In Europe ====
First class service was formerly available on intra-European flights on airlines such as Air France, British Airways, Lufthansa and Swissair. First class seats were typically configured in a 4-abreast configuration, similar to current North American domestic first class seats, rather than the 6-abreast configuration used for economy and latterly business class services.

During the 1980s European first class was largely phased out in favour of 6-abreast seating throughout the aircraft, with variable numbers of seats allocated to business class (the business class cabin often being marked with a moveable divider). This allowed greater flexibility for the airlines, allowing them to allocate different amounts of premium seating depending on the route. Airlines flying longer intra-European routes, such as Aeroflot, El Al, Icelandair and Turkish Airlines, still offer dedicated 4-abreast seating in their premium intra-Europe cabins, but they are sold as business class seats rather than first class.

== Additional benefits ==
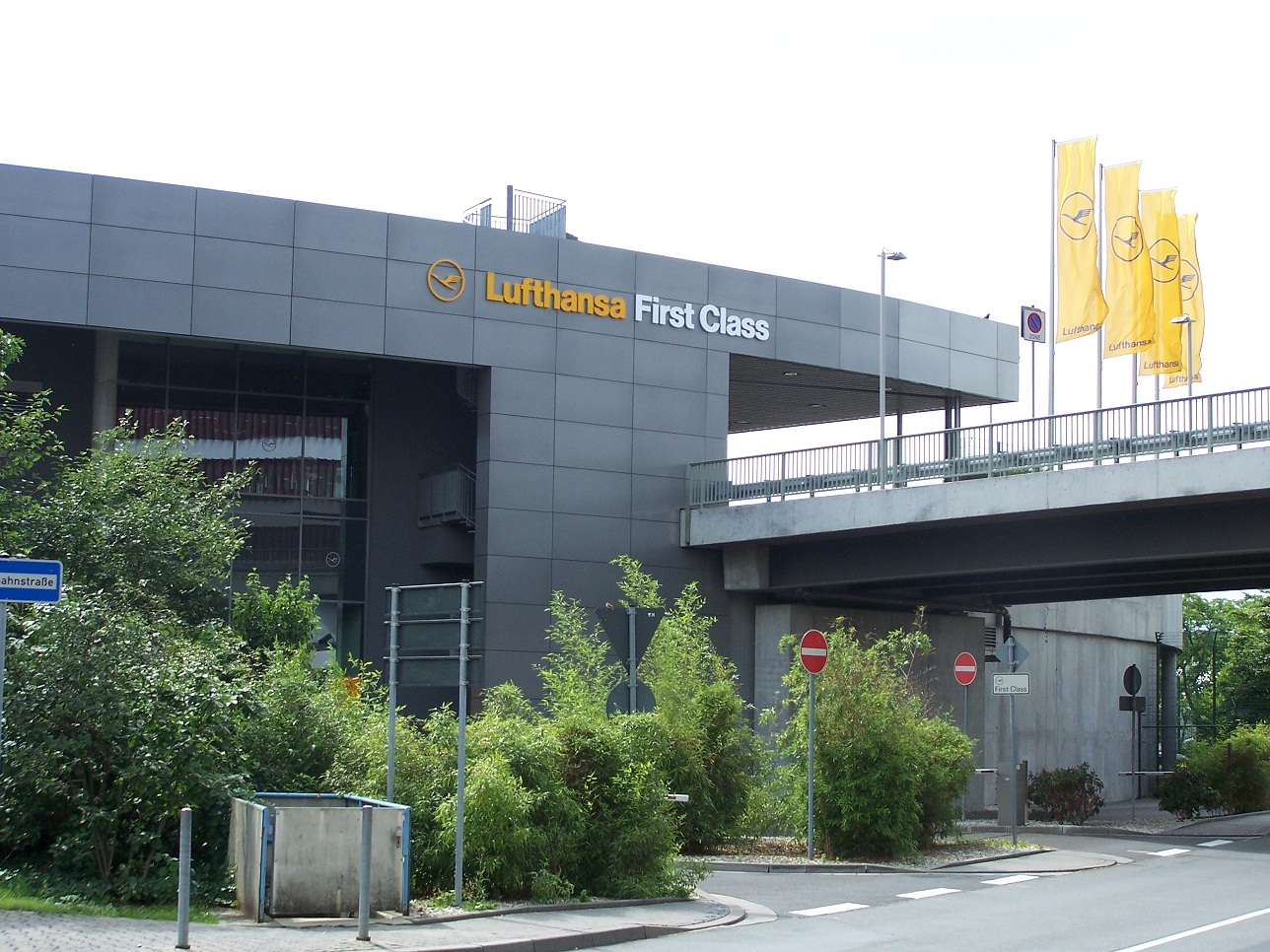
Lufthansa's First Class Terminal at Frankfurt Airport

On the ground, first class passengers usually have special check-in and security zones at the airport. Some airlines operate private first class terminals and/or offer international first class passengers complimentary limousine rides to the airport. While it is typical that these passengers have lounge access, some airlines have separate lounges for first and business whereas the former may have more luxurious amenities. These passengers can often board the aircraft before other passengers, sometimes through their jetbridge.

Alcoholic and non-alcoholic drinks are complimentary and gourmet meals are usually served with a choice of wine, dessert, and apéritifs. Often these meals have been designed by leading chefs and are served on white linen tablecloths and with real cutlery.

== Pricing ==
Historically, first class air travel has been very expensive. First class long-haul fares regularly exceed $10,000 or €10,000 per person for an intercontinental long-haul round trip, as opposed to $4,000–5,000 international business class tickets and $300–2,000 economy class tickets. With the emergence of frequent-flyer programmes, however, passengers have been able to upgrade their business or economy class tickets through membership in elite frequent-flyer programmes and through the policies of some airlines that allow business and economy-class passengers to purchase last-minute upgrades on a space-available basis.

== Current operators ==
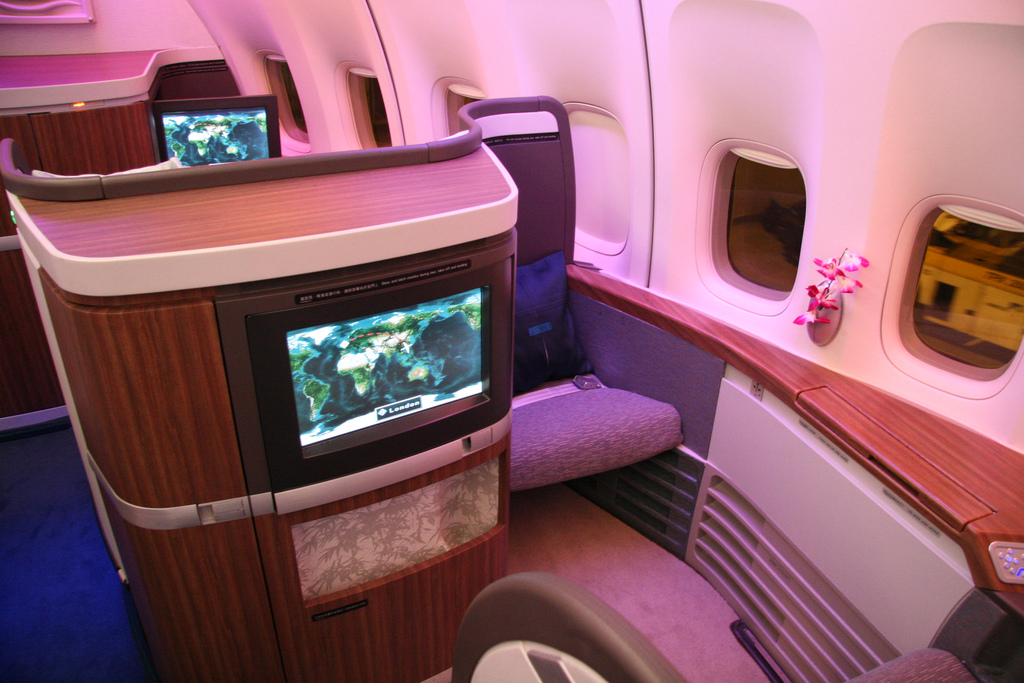
A first class seat on board a Cathay Pacific Boeing 777-300ER

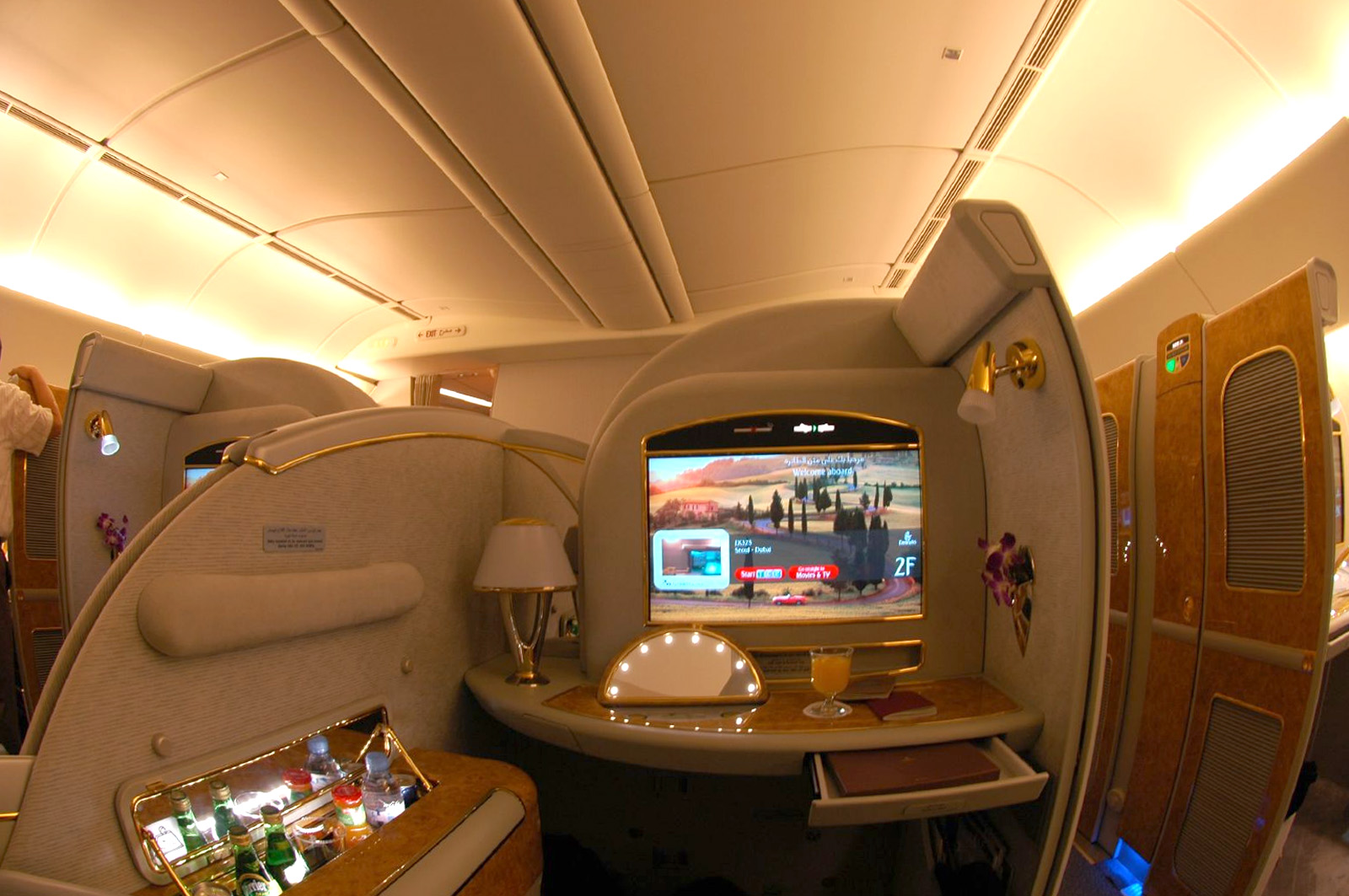
First class seat on an Emirates Boeing 777-200LR

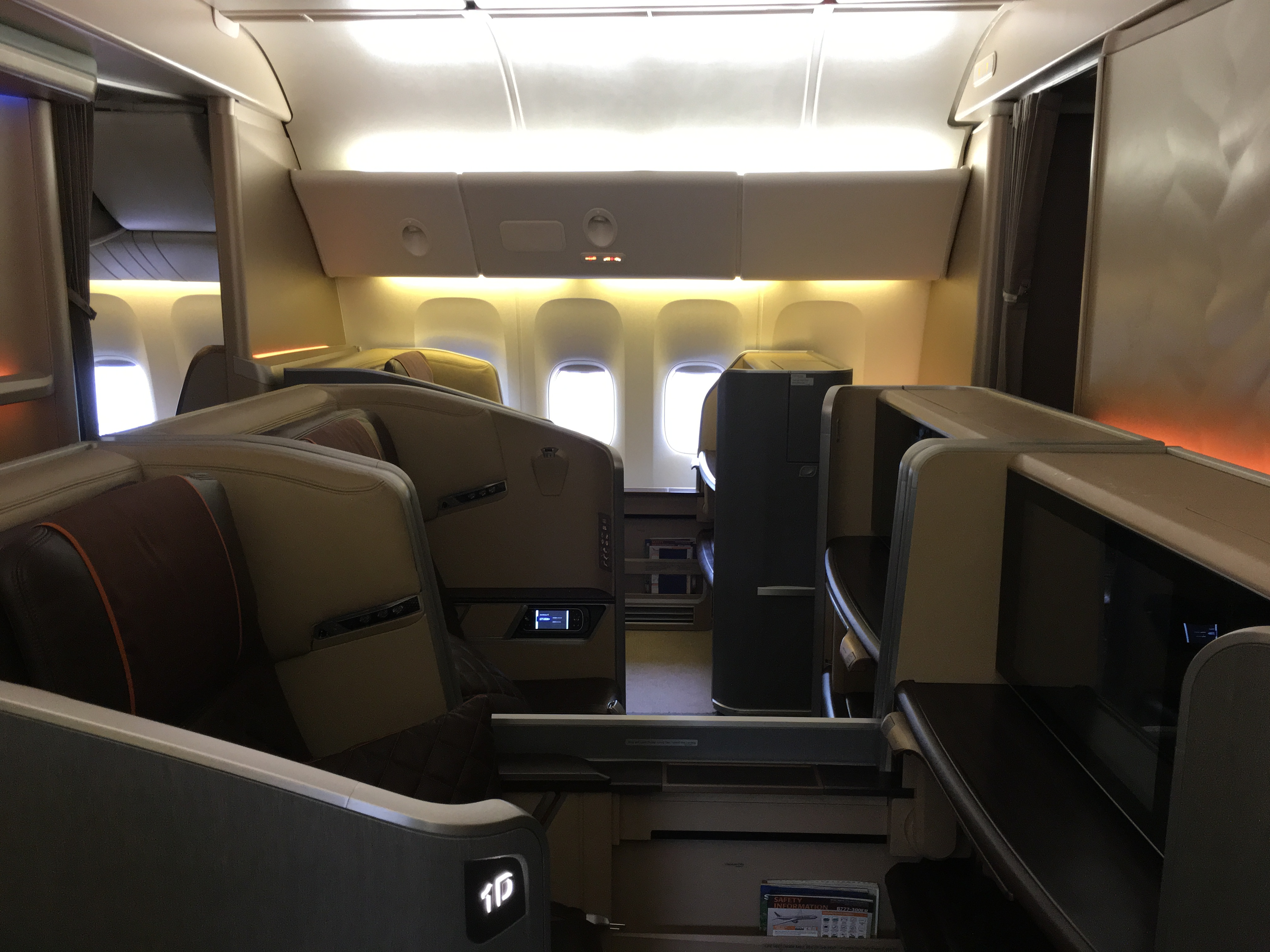
A First Class seat on a Singapore Airlines Boeing 777-300ER

This is a list of airlines that have some or all of their wide-body long-haul aircraft equipped with a First Class section as of 2024, omitting the products branded as domestic First Class common in the United States:

Africa

- (Ivory Coast) Air Côte d'Ivoire
- TAAG Angola Airlines

Americas

- (United States) American Airlines – to be phased-out

Asia

- Air China
- Air India
- (Japan) All Nippon Airways
- (Hong Kong) Cathay Pacific
- China Eastern Airlines
- Garuda Indonesia
- Japan Airlines
- (South Korea) Korean Air
- Singapore Airlines
- (Taiwan) Starlux Airlines
- (Thailand) Thai Airways International
- (China) XiamenAir

Europe

- Air France
- (United Kingdom) British Airways
- (Germany) Lufthansa
- (Switzerland) Swiss International Air Lines

Middle East

- (United Arab Emirates) Emirates
- (United Arab Emirates) Etihad Airways
- Kuwait Airways
- Oman Air
- Qatar Airways
- (Saudi Arabia) Saudia

Oceania

- (Australia) Qantas

== Former operators ==
Several airlines abandoned their First Class cabins for various reasons over the past decades:

- Air New Zealand – Dedicated First Class cabin was previously available on Boeing 747-400 aircraft, but was withdrawn in 2006–2007 with the introduction of Premium Economy and flat-bed suites in Business Class. "Business Premier" is now the highest class of service.
- (South Korea) Asiana Airlines – A First Class cabin was featured on Airbus A380s, Boeing 747-400s, and select Boeing 777-200ER aircraft. The First Class seats were either available as fully closed suites (First Suite on Airbus A380 and select Boeing 777-200ER) or as open suite style flat-bed sleeper seats (Old First Class on Boeing 747-400). Between 2016 and 2018, First Class was eliminated from the Boeing 777-200ER fleet in favor of more Business Class and Economy Class seats. In April 2019, the Kumho Asiana Group began to enter a financial crisis and announced the sale of Asiana Airlines. Due to the financial crisis, Asiana announced that First Class would be eliminated from all remaining aircraft with First Class by the end of September 2019 to save the airline from collapsing and in favor of newer Business Class seats and Premium Economy. All Asiana Airlines planes with First Class were retrofitted with newer Business Class and Premium Economy cabins.
- (Hong Kong) Cathay Dragon – First Class was available on selected Airbus A330 aircraft. The seats were similar to Cathay Pacific's long-haul business class which are in a reverse herringbone seating arrangement. Cathay Dragon ceased operations in October 2020, due to restructuring of Cathay Pacific as all Cathay Dragon A330s were transferred to Cathay Pacific and all ex-Cathay Dragon Airbus A330s with First Class were reconfigured to a two class configuration featuring Business Class and Economy Class cabins only, to match Cathay Pacific's regional configured Airbus A330s.
- (Taiwan) China Airlines – Dedicated First Class was previously available on Boeing 747-400, with the introduction of Premium Economy and Premium Business Class on its Boeing 777-300ER. "Premium Business Class" is now the highest class of service. The first class was eliminated altogether in February 2021, following the retirement of the Boeing 747-400s from the China Airlines fleet.
- China Southern Airlines – First Class was previously available on board select Airbus A330s, all Airbus A380s, all Boeing 777-300ERs, and all Boeing 787-8 Dreamliner aircraft. China Southern retired its First Class in 2022 as the airline retired its Airbus A380 fleet and retrofitted its Airbus A330, Boeing 777-300ER, and Boeing 787-8 Dreamliner aircraft featuring first class with new three class configurations featuring new Business Class, Premium Economy, and Economy Class cabins only. As a result, Business Class is now the highest class of service on China Southern Airlines aircraft.
- (Israel) El Al – First Class was formerly offered on El Al's Boeing 747 and 777 aircraft. El Al retired its Boeing 747 fleet in 2019, and is in the process of retrofitting its Boeing 777 aircraft into a new configuration similar to its Boeing 787 fleet, which lacks first class seats, in the 2020s. While the First Class seats remain installed on those Boeing 777s which are yet to be retrofitted with the new cabins, they are now marketed and operated as part of Business class. As a result, Business Class is now the highest class of service on El Al aircraft.
- (India) Jet Airways – First Class was available aboard all Boeing 777-300ER aircraft, but was announced to be discontinued in 2017 to cut costs, after which the airline became defunct in 2019.
- Malaysia Airlines – Business Suite Class (previously known as First Class)
- Oman Air – Business Studio (previously known as First Class)
- (Philippines) Philippine Airlines – Dedicated first class or the "Maharlika Class" cabins were withdrawn in mid- 2000s. During the second half of 2006, PAL announced a cabin reconfiguration project for its Boeing 747-400 and Airbus A340-300 aircraft. The airline spent US$85.7 million to remove all first class seats and increase the size of its business and economy seats, leading to the aforementioned new seats; as well as add personal screens with audio and video on-demand (AVOD) across both cabin classes.
- (South Africa) South African Airways – Dedicated first class cabin was withdrawn in 2001, but First Class could still be seen on the Boeing 747-400 aircraft until they were retired in 2007 and 2010. Until 1997, First Class was known as "Blue Diamond Class".
- (Brazil) TAM Brasil – Dedicated first class was available on 777-300ER aircraft until 2014
- (Russia) Transaero – Imperial Class (aboard some 737 and some Boeing 747 and all 777 aircraft).
- (Turkey) Turkish Airlines – First Class suites were previously available on long-haul 777 aircraft. Progressively removed from September 2011 following the introduction of Comfort Class, the carrier's premium economy product and newer Business Class seats.
- (United States) United Airlines – Long-Haul First Class were open suite flat-bed sleeper seats and were available on all Boeing 747-400, select Boeing 767-300ER, and select Boeing 777-200ER. First Class was named "Global First" (later "Polaris First"). The first class began to be phased out in 2017 as United retired all their 747-400s. United discontinued all first class services by March 2018, although the first class seats remained on select Boeing 767-300ER and select 777-200ER aircraft with them being sold as Polaris Business until 2020, when they were all retrofitted with the same cabins that debuted on board the airline's Boeing 777-300ER and Boeing 787-10 aircraft.
- (United States) US Airways – International First Class consisted of six flatbed suites in the first row on the Airbus A330-300. International First Class was eliminated as a separate class of service in 2002, although the seats remained until the A330-300 fleet was refurbished. Any Envoy passenger could reserve an "Envoy Sleeper" seat in the first row for a small fee at booking, or for free at check-in if seats were available – ground service, on-board service, catering and entertainment were identical to Envoy.

== See also ==
- First class travel
- Business class
- Premium economy
- Economy class
