= Departure control system =

Airlines computer systems responsible for passenger and bag processing activities

A departure control system (DCS) automates processing an airline's airport management operation, which includes managing the information required for airport check-in, printing boarding cards, baggage acceptance, boarding, load control and aircraft checks.

Today, DCS mostly (98%) manage e-tickets using interfaces from a number of devices, including check-in kiosks, online check-in, mobile boarding cards, and baggage handling. DCS are able to identify, capture and update reservations from an airline's computer reservation system for passengers stored in a so-called passenger name record (PNR). A DCS is used to update reservations, typically as checked-in, boarded, flown or another status.

Additionally and increasingly, a DCS for some city-pair sectors may also interface with immigration control (such as Advance Passenger Information System) for visa, immigration and passenger no-fly watchlists.

Historically, systems developed in North America have incorporated DCS functions as part of the reservations systems with check-in being initiated directly from the PNR. Load control (weight and balance) is then provided by a standalone application. Systems developed by airlines outside North America have traditionally had a separate database for DCS, requiring passenger data to be transferred from the PNR into DCS records. These systems have an integrated weight and balance capability.

"New generation" DCSs are being developed and deployed by vendors such as Amadeus and SITA as part of the overall re-engineering of airline Passenger Services Systems. These new systems typically use a common database and a services oriented architecture that allows reservations, check-in and other services to maintain a consistent view of passenger information.

Larger international airports will have a range of DCS or a single DCS which each particular airline carrier can integrate with for streamlined operations.
