= Amadeus IT Group =

Spanish travel technology company

Amadeus IT Group, S.A.

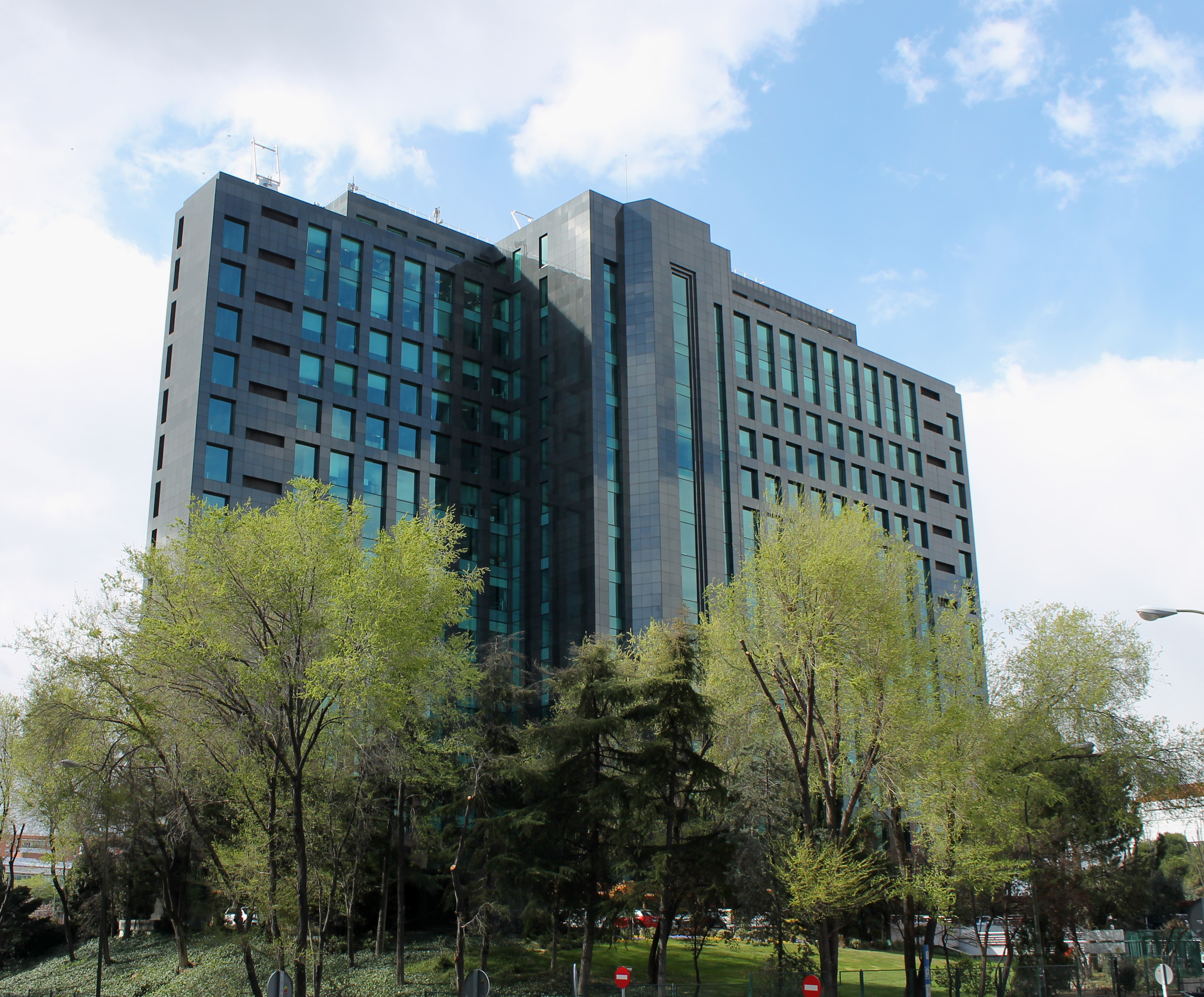
- Headquarters in Madrid, Spain
- Type: Public
- Traded as: BMAD: AMS; IBEX 35 component
- ISIN: ES0109067019
- Industry: Travel technology
- Founded: 1987; 39 years ago
- Headquarters: Madrid, Spain
- Key people: William Connelly; (chairman); Luis Maroto; (president and CEO)
- Products: Travel reservation and booking, Travel management, distribution, booking, Analytics
- Services: Provision of computer reservations systems; IT systems for the travel industry; online travel agency
- Revenue: ▲€6.14 billion (2024)
- Operating income: ▲€1.63 billion (2024)
- Net income: ▲€1.34 billion (2024)
- Number of employees: ▼16,433 (end 2021)
- Subsidiaries: Amadeus Leisure IT GmbH, AAI, vision-box, Navitaire
- Website: amadeus.com

Amadeus IT Group, S.A. (/ˌæməˈdeɪəs aɪ ˈtiː/) is a Spanish multinational technology company that provides software for the global travel and tourism industry. The parent company of Amadeus IT Group, holding over 99.7% of the firm, is Amadeus IT Holding S.A. It was listed on the Spanish stock exchanges on 29 April 2010.

Amadeus has central sites in Madrid, Spain (corporate headquarters and marketing), Sophia Antipolis, France (product development), London, UK (product development), Breda, Netherlands (development), Erding, Germany (Data center) and Bangalore, India (product development) as well as regional offices in Bangkok, Buenos Aires, Dubai, Miami, Istanbul, Singapore, and Sydney. At market level, Amadeus maintains customer operations through 173 local Amadeus Commercial Organisations (ACOs) covering 195 countries. The Amadeus group employs 21,500 employees worldwide, and listed in Forbes' list of "The World's Largest Public Companies" as No. 985.

== History ==
Since 2004, the company has invested €1 billion in R&D. In 2005, Amadeus was delisted from the Paris, Frankfurt and Madrid stock exchanges when BC Partners and Cinven bought their stake from three of the four founding airlines and the rest of the capital floated from institutional and minority shareholders. The transition from distribution system to technology provider was reflected by the change in its corporate name to Amadeus IT Group in 2006. In 2009, Amadeus invested about €257 million in R&D.

In September 2014, Air France sold a 3% stake in the firm for $438 million. In November 2017, Amadeus invested in global mapping tech provider AVUXI.

== Controversies ==
On 15 January 2019, hacker and activist Noam Rotem discovered a major vulnerability in Amadeus's airline booking system, affecting nearly half of all airlines worldwide. While booking a flight with Israeli national carrier El Al, he came across a significant security breach that allows anyone to access and change private information on flight bookings. The same breach was then discovered to include 44% of the international carriers market, potentially affecting tens of millions of travelers.

In June 2025, Spain's data protection watchdog fined the company €18 million for a traveler profiling project. According to the agency, "Amadeus had failed to comply with its obligations to provide data subjects with information about its processing under Article 14 GDPR". The company paid €14.4 million as part of the fine but still appealed the decision. According to one source, this penalty resulted in accelerated investments in zero trust security architecture in the travel industry.

== Contribution to open source ==
According to a May 2015 investigation, Amadeus has contributed to the Docker open source software project.

== Business model and other business lines ==
In 2000, Amadeus was awarded the development of two new operational applications for British Airways and Qantas: the inventory management and the departure control systems. These products were outside of the core expertise domain of Amadeus and were built with the expertise of the airlines.
