= Reinaud =

Reinaud may refer to:

- Joseph Toussaint Reinaud (1795–1867), French orientalist
- Émile Reinaud (1854–1924), French politician
- Cécile Reinaud (born 1973), French entrepreneur
