= Lastminute.com Group =

Travel brands owner

lastminute.com N.V.
- Company type: Public
- Traded as: SIX: LMN
- Industry: Travel; Technology
- Founded: 2006; 20 years ago
- Founder: Fabio Cannavale; Marco Corradino
- Headquarters: Chiasso, Switzerland
- Key people: Alessandro Petazzi (CEO); Corrado Casto (COO)
- Products: Travel agency Metasearch engine
- Brands: Lastminute.com; Volagratis; Rumbo; Bravofly; Jetcost; Hotelscan; Crocierissime.it weg.de
- Number of employees: Over 1,400
- Website: www.lastminutegroup.com

Lastminute.com N.V. is the owner of several travel brands including lastminute.com, Volagratis, Rumbo, Bravofly, Jetcost, Crocierissime.it, weg.de, and Hotelscan.

The company operates websites and mobile apps in 17 languages and 40 countries and has 43 million monthly unique users.

It was called Bravofly Rumbo Group until May 2015.

== History ==
Lastminute.com Group was founded in 2006 but traces its roots back to 2004, when Fabio Cannavale and Marco Corradino launched Volagratis, a search engine for low cost flights in the Italian market.

In 2006, it was organized as a Group, the headquarters were moved to Chiasso and it began its international expansion by introducing localized websites in Spain, France, Germany and the United Kingdom.

In November 2012, it acquired Rumbo, a Spanish online travel agency.

In December 2013, it acquired Jetcost, a French travel metasearch engine.

On 15 April 2014, the company was listed on the SIX Swiss Exchange in Zurich.

In March 2015, the company acquired lastminute.com from Sabre Holdings, owner of online travel agency Travelocity.com, the for £76 million, and in May 2015 it changed its name to lastminute.com group.

In 2016, the company launched Travel People, an advertising platform.

In September 2016, the company acquired WAYN, a social travel network, for £1 million.

In November 2017, it acquired Hotelscan.com, a hotel metasearch engine.

In December 2017, the company acquired German Comvel GmbH, founded 2004 in Munich, which operates weg.de.

In April 2019, the company created Forward, a media company.

== Main Brands ==
- lastminute.com is an online travel and leisure retailer. The company was founded by Martha Lane Fox and Brent Hoberman to offer late holiday deals online. The company was sold in 2005 to Sabre Holdings, parent of online travel agency Travelocity.com, for £600 million.
- Volagratis.com was launched Italy in 2004. It offers a range of services including hotels, flights, city breaks, holidays, cruises and car rentals.
- Rumbo, launched in Spain in 2000, operates websites in other European countries as well as in South America. Rumbo is a full-service travel website, with its offering comprising hotels, flights, city breaks, package holidays and cruises.
- Jetcost is a metasearch engine that focuses on airfares in 38 countries.
- Hotelscan is a metasearch engine for lodging. Its daily updated database of around 1.3 million properties with data from over 100 online booking website.
- Bravofly is a full-service travel website. Founded in 2006, Bravofly websites are available in 17 languages in 40 countries.
- weg.de is a German travel website operated by Comvel GmbH, which was founded 2004 in Munich. weg.de focuses on package holidays and all-inclusive vacations.
- Crocierissime.it is an Italian travel website.
