= Kendalls =

Kendalls may refer to:

- BDO Kendalls, one of the largest accounting firms in Australia outside of the Big Four
- The Kendalls, the US Country music group
- Kendall & Sons. Kendall's, the UK umbrella manufacturer and ladies fashion retailer
