= Jetcost =

Travel metasearch engine

Jetcost.com
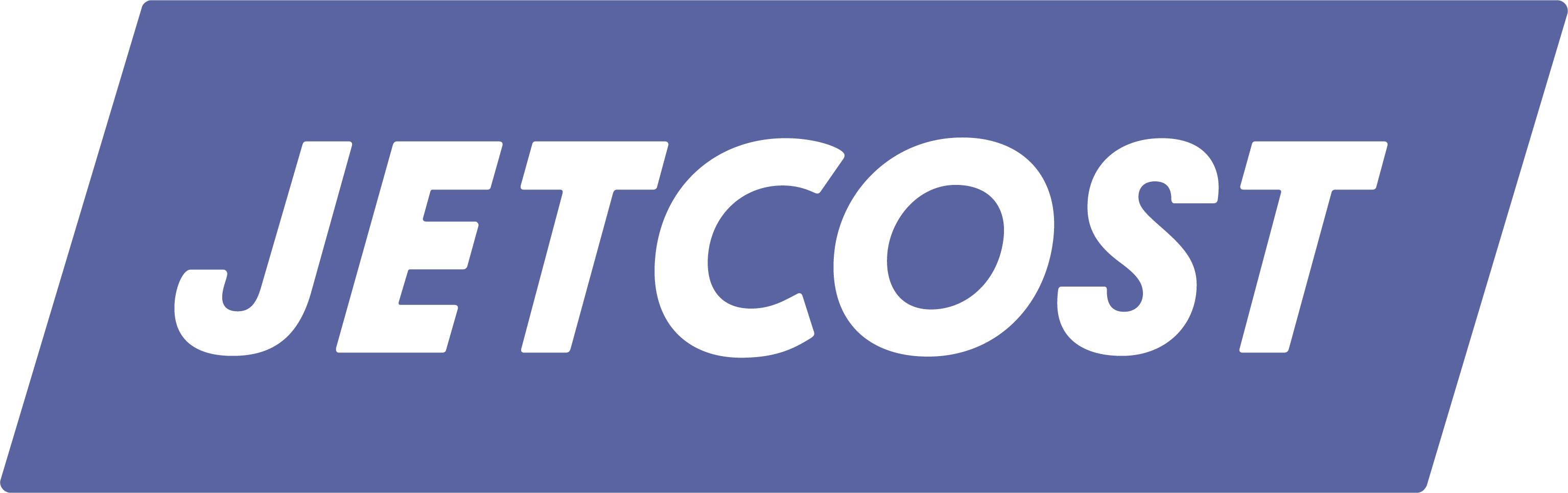
- Website type: Travel metasearch engine
- Headquarters: Paris, France
- Owner: Lastminute.com Group
- Revenue: €67 million (2017)
- Website: www.jetcost.com
- Registration: No
- Launched: June 1, 2006; 20 years ago

Jetcost.com is a travel metasearch engine for finding airfares. It acts as an intermediary, and does not directly sell flights or travel products. Since 2013, Jetcost has been a brand of Lastminute.com Group. The site is most popular in Western Europe and the top search words on the site are for Air France, Ryanair, and Transavia.

== History ==
The website was launched on June 1, 2006.

In December 2013, Jetcost was acquired by Bravofly Rumbo Group (now Lastminute.com Group).

At the time of the acquisition in 2013, the company had revenue of €8 million. By 2017, revenue increased to €67 million.

== See also ==
- FlightsFinder.com
- Liligo.com
