= Bravofly (website) =

Bravofly.com
- The logo for Bravofly.com
- Website type: Travel agency
- Available in: English language French language Spanish language German language Hungarian language Swedish language Finnish language Norwegian language
- Headquarters: Chiasso, Switzerland
- Owner: Lastminute.com Group
- Website: www.bravofly.com www.bravofly.co.uk www.bravofly.fr www.rumbo.es www.volagratis.com www.bravofly.de www.bravofly.hu www.bravofly.se www.bravofly.fi www.bravofly.no
- Commercial: Yes
- Registration: Yes
- Launched: 2006; 20 years ago

Bravofly.com is an online travel agency owned by the Lastminute.com Group. It is available to customers in 14 languages. It has offices in Chiasso, Switzerland, where it has its operational headquarters, and in Madrid, Spain.

== History ==
The Bravofly Rumbo Group was founded in 2006, but traces its roots back to 2004, when Fabio Cannavale and Marco Corradino launched Volagratis, a search engine for low cost flights in the Italian market.

In 2006, the headquarters were moved to Chiasso and the company introduced websites for Spain, France, Germany and the United Kingdom.

in November 2012, it acquired Rumbo.

In December 2013, the company announced the acquisition of Jetcost, a French travel meta-search site.

In March 2015, the company acquired Lastminute.com for $120m (£76m).

In April 2014, the company became a public company via an initial public offering on the SIX Swiss Exchange.
