= Next plc =

British retailer

- Trade name: Next
- Formerly: J Hepworth & Son (1864–1982)
- Type: Public limited company
- Traded as: LSE: NXT; FTSE 100 Component
- ISIN: GB0032089863
- Industry: Retail
- Founded: 1864; 162 years ago Leeds
- Founder: Joseph Hepworth
- Headquarters: Enderby, England, UK
- Number of locations: c. 700 stores (500 in the UK)
- Area served: United Kingdom; Europe; Asia; Middle East
- Key people: Michael Roney (Chairman); Lord Wolfson (CEO)
- Brands: Next Beauty; Next Home; Lipsy; Victoria's Secret UK; Bath & Body Works UK; Gap UK; Joules; Cath Kidston; FatFace; Made.com; Seraphine; Russell & Bromley
- Revenue: ▲£6,901.3 million (2026)
- Operating income: ▲£1,278.8 million (2026)
- Net income: ▲£898.0 million (2026)
- Total assets: ▲£4,915.3 million (2026)
- Total equity: ▲£1,780.5 million (2026)
- Number of employees: 50,000 (2025)
- Subsidiaries: JoJo Maman Bébé (44%); Reiss (72%)
- Website: www.next.co.uk

Next plc, trading as Next and styled as NEXT, is a British multinational clothing, footwear, and home products retailer, which has its headquarters in Enderby, England. It has around 700 stores, of which about 500 are in the United Kingdom, and 200 across Europe, Asia, and the Middle East, and also provides e-commerce services for other clothing manufacturers. It is listed on the London Stock Exchange and is a constituent of the FTSE 100 Index. Next is the largest clothing retailer by sales in the United Kingdom, having overtaken Marks & Spencer in early 2012, and then again in 2014.

== History ==
=== Hepworth ===
The company was founded by Joseph Hepworth in Leeds in 1864 as a tailor under the name of Joseph Hepworth & Son. Initially Hepworth was in partnership with James Rhodes, but the partnership was dissolved in 1872. On his own, Hepworth expanded the company rapidly, becoming a pioneer of the development of chain stores in Britain. By 1884 the company had 100 outlets. For much of its history Hepworth was predominantly in the ready-to-wear suit market. In 1963, the company brought in the celebrated Savile Row designer Hardy Amies to help revitalise its ready-to-wear suit collection.

=== Kendall's and Next ===
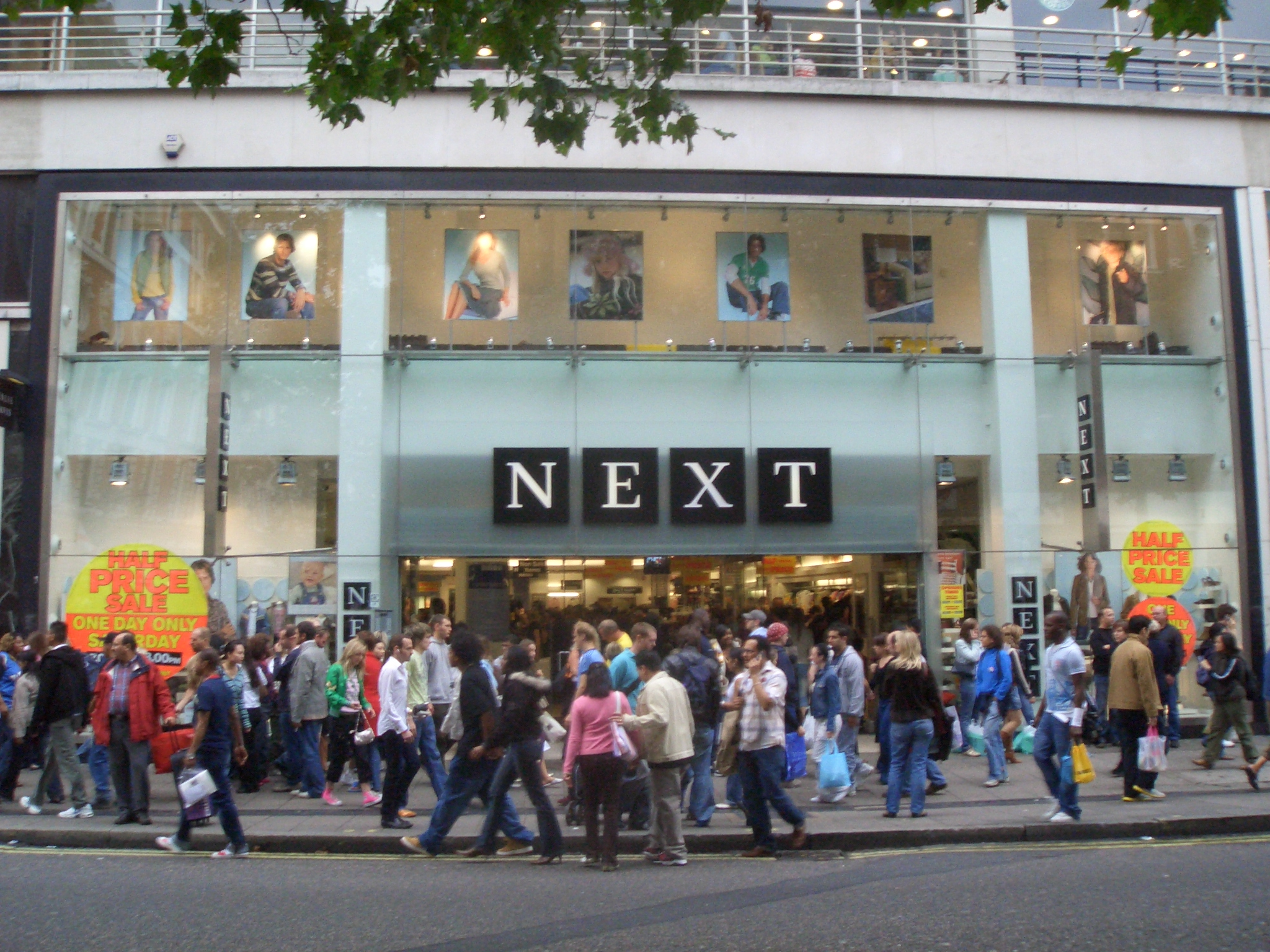
A branch of Next showing the old logos on Oxford Street in London in 2005

In 1981, the company bought womenswear retailer Kendall & Sons for £1.75 million from the retail conglomerate Combined English Stores. This gave Hepworth over 600 shops in British high streets. The intention was to redevelop Kendall's stores as a womenswear chain of shops to complement Hepworth as a chain of menswear stores. Designer Terence Conran was Chairman of Hepworth at that time, and recruited George Davies to work at Kendall's; however, Davies's concept was to create a new chain, called Next, initially by converting Kendall's stores. The first Next shops opened on 12 February 1982, with the Kendall's conversion complete by the end of 1983.

Appointed chief executive in 1984, Davies then converted 50 Hepworth stores to the Next format, extending the range to cover menswear. This allowed the development of mini department stores selling women's and men's clothes. This was added to by the introduction of Next interiors to stores which were deemed in the "right demographical areas." In 1986, Davies moved the group's headquarters from Leeds to Leicester, to be closer to the main garment manufacturers, and the company name was changed to Next plc.

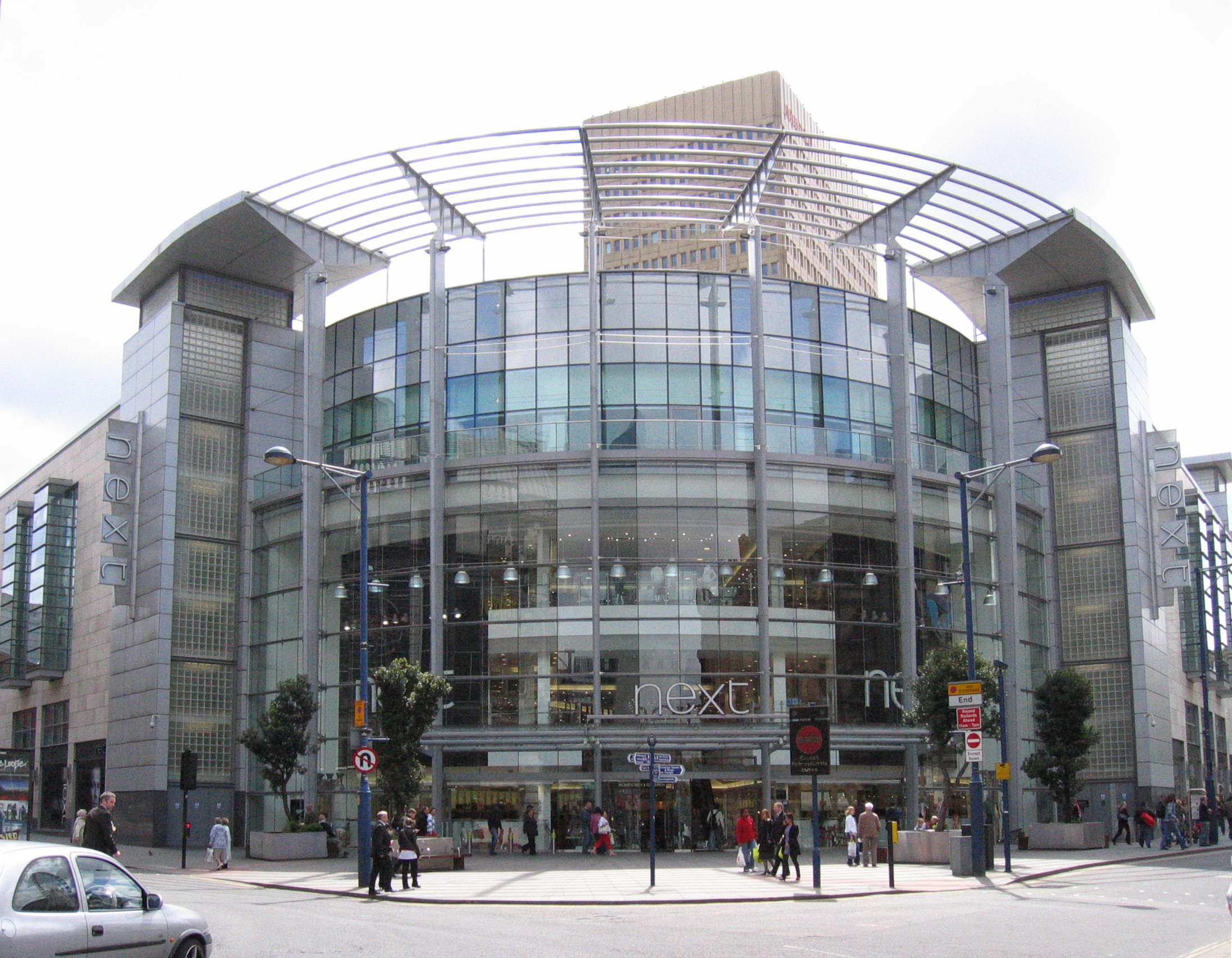
Next at Manchester Arndale

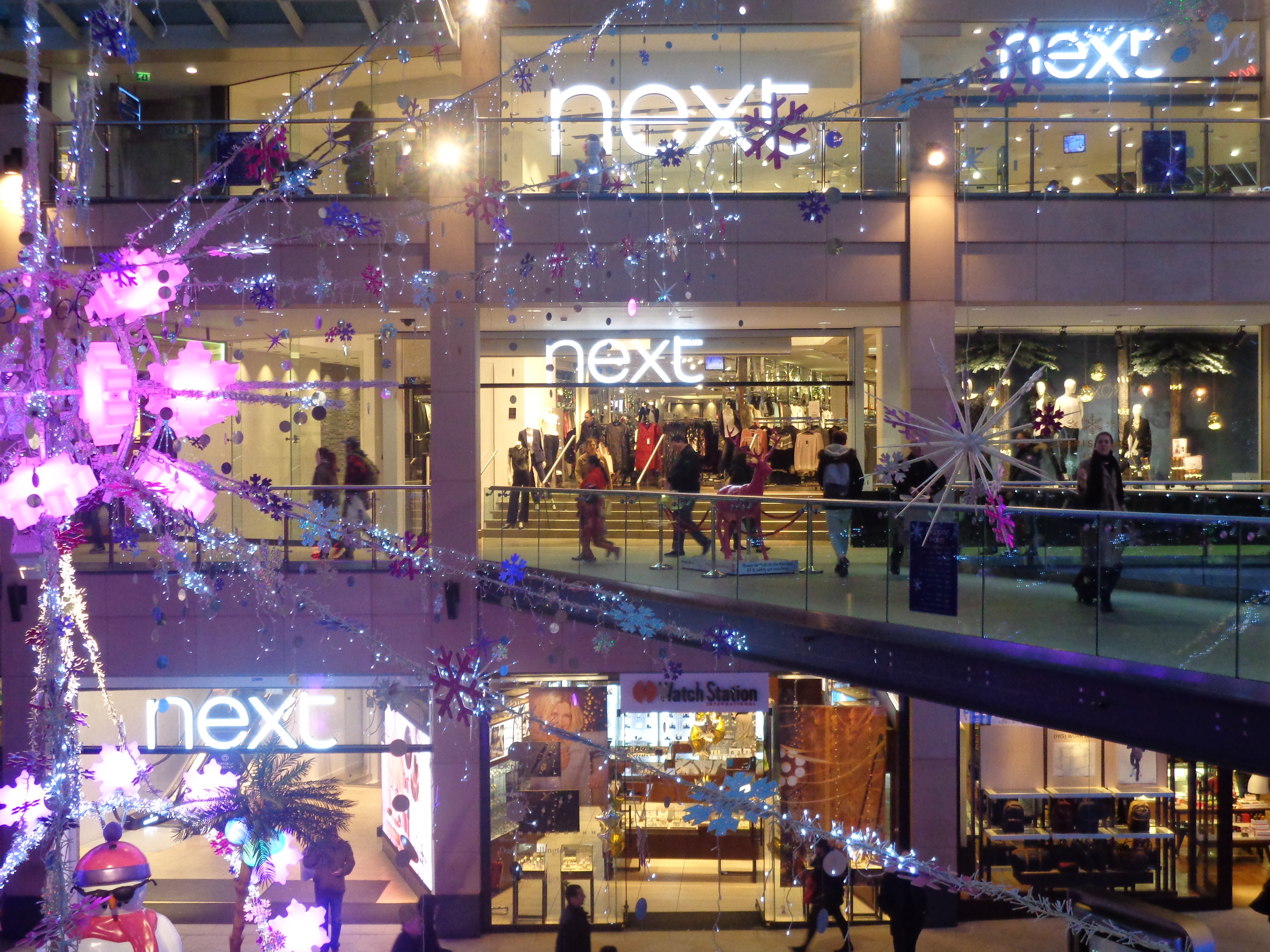
Next at Trinity Leeds

In 1987, the group acquired Combined English Stores and the Grattan catalogue company. Extending first to introduce Next childrenswear, Davies then introduced the Next Directory. By 1988, "after seven years of growth, Next had over-expanded suicidally", and "some stores were not bringing in enough to pay the rent". Davies was sacked and the share price fell to 7p. Chairman Sir David Jones accused Davies of being egotistical and taking Next to the verge of bankruptcy. In October 1988, Next sold 433 jewellery stores in the United Kingdom, which principally traded under the Salisburys and Zales brands, to the Ratners Group for US$232 million.

The company bought the youth brand Lipsy in 2008. In autumn 2009, Next launched an online catalogue for the United States offering clothing, shoes and accessories for women, men and children. Next's prices in Ireland attracted criticism in 2009 when the company was one of four retailers accused of failing to pass on exchange rate savings to shoppers in the Republic. In July 2010, a BBC investigation found Next was breaking the Consumer Protection (Distance Selling) Regulations 2000 by billing customers for its delivery costs even if goods were returned within the seven working days. A spokesman for Next admitted that they had been doing this for three years but promised to comply by August 2010. Trading Standards said that the DSRs had been in force for ten years, and there was no excuse for not adhering to them. In 2014, Next launched localised cross-border sales to Ukraine.

=== Wages controversy ===
In May 2014, the Living Wage Foundation bought Next shares and attended the annual general meeting in an attempt to persuade the company to pay at least £7.65 and become one of the UK's 700 living wage employers. Next was targeted because it claimed to be a good employer and was thriving. Professor Sir George Bain, who set the minimum wage in 1999, said employers could afford to pay much more but acknowledged enforcement could cause unemployment in the retail sector.

In October 2014, the company was one of several retailers criticised by journalist Janice Turner in The Times for failing to pay what she described as a living wage. Turner further argued UK taxpayers pay £28 billion to low-paid workers through tax credits, and retail companies – which have the highest proportion of low paid workers – are exploiting austerity and effectively adding staff wages to the UK welfare bill. When asked to explain the salaries of lower-wage workers despite large profits, a Next spokesperson replied that the company had thirty applicants for every job advertised.

=== Next (Ireland), Next Germany, and further acquisitions ===
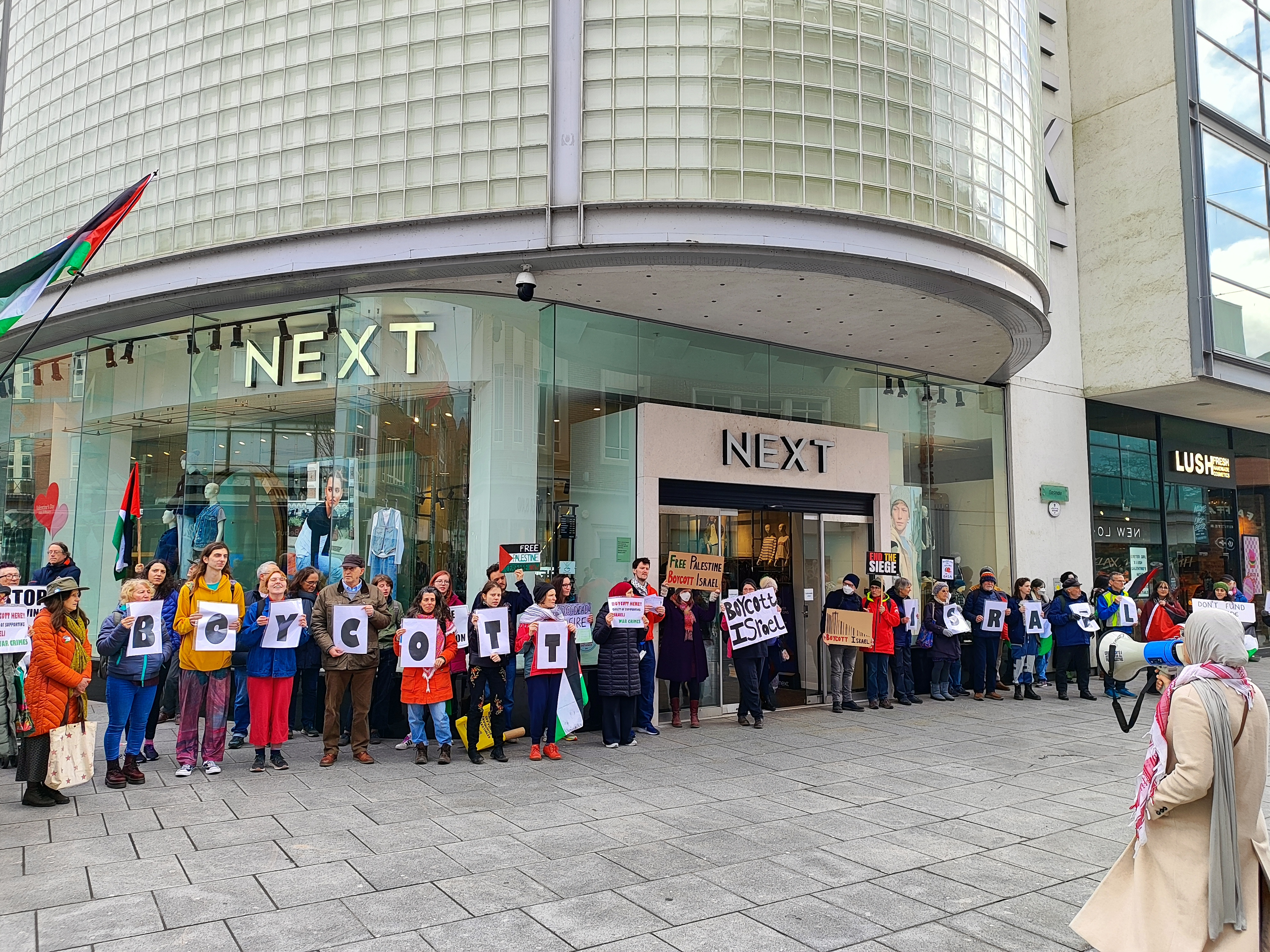
Pro-Palestinian protest outside Next on 10 February 2024

In September 2018, the company's Irish operations profits were separated from Next plc. Next (Ireland) Ltd was formally established to focus on the distribution of products in its physical stores and its online store in the Republic of Ireland. At the same time, Next Germany was established. In November 2022, it was announced Next had acquired the London-headquartered furniture retailer, Made.com, which in the same month had gone into administration. In December 2022, the company bought the chain Joules out of administration for £34 million in a joint venture with its founder Tom Joule.

In March 2023, it was announced Next had acquired vintage fashion and homeware retailer Cath Kidston out of administration for £8.5 million. The acquisition meant Next had bought the brand name, domain names and intellectual property, but remaining stock was to be sold off by administrators and the four Cath Kidston stores (London, York, Ashford, and Cheshire Oaks) were to shut. According to research of the Helena Kennedy Center for International Justice, the Progressive Alliance of Socialists and Democrats in the European Parliament, and further institutions published in December 2023, the company makes use of forced labour of Uyghurs provided by the China-based supplier Beijing Guanghua Textile Group.

In January 2026, it was announced that Next had acquired the British footwear retailer Russell & Bromley through a pre-pack insolvency process. The transaction involved the purchase of the brand and selected assets, with administrators continuing to assess the future of the retailer’s physical store estate.

== Operations ==
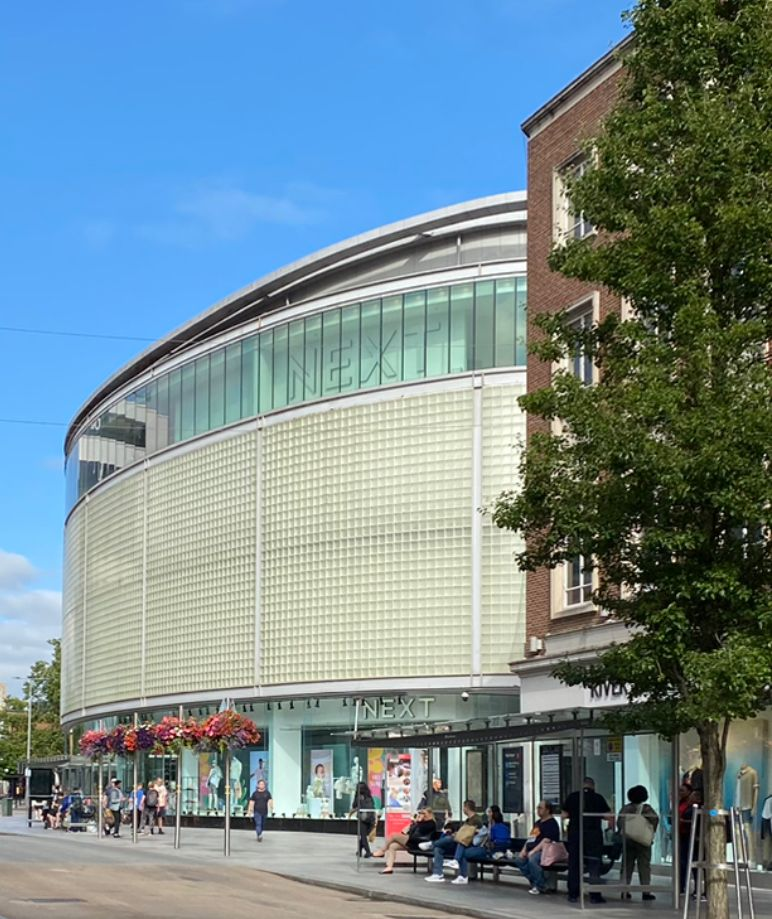
Next at Exeter, England

Next has three main channels: Next Retail, a chain of over 550 retail branches in the United Kingdom; Next Directory, a home shopping catalogue and website with more than 3 million active customers, and Next International, with over 180 international stores. Its other businesses include Next Sourcing, for own brand products and Lipsy, which designs and sells its own branded younger women's fashion products through wholesale, retail and website channels.

Next operates stores and e-commerce for Victoria's Secret in the UK. In September 2021, Next announced a joint venture with Gap. Next would manage Gap's UK website and place Gap concessions in some Next stores. The deal preserves Gap's presence on the UK high street after Gap announced in July 2021 it would close all of its UK stores.

Next also sells sales services, known as Total Platform, for smaller clothing companies.

== Financial data ==
Numbers are in millions of pounds.

| Financial year ended | Revenue | | | Net Income | Number of stores | Reference |
| Financial year ended | Total | In stores | Online | Net Income | Number of stores | Reference |
|---|---|---|---|---|---|---|
| January 2026 | 6,901 | 3,033.2 | 3,867.8 | 898.0 | 458 | |
| January 2025 | 6,118 | 2,916.8 | 3,201.2 | 743.2 | 457 | |
| January 2024 | 5,491 | 2,589.6 | 2,901.4 | 800.5 | 458 | |
| January 2023 | 5,034 | 2,289.8 | 2,744.2 | 710.7 | 466 | |
| January 2022 | 4,626 | 1,751.5 | 2,874.4 | 677.5 | 477 | |
| January 2021 | 3,284 | 954.5 | 2,368.4 | 286.7 | 491 | |
| January 2020 | 4,362 | 1,851.9 | 2,146.6 | 593.9 | 498 | |
| January 2019 | 4,211 | 1,955 | 1,918.8 | 590.4 | 507 | |
| January 2018 | 4,118 | 2,123 | 1,728.5 | 591.8 | 528 | |
| January 2017 | 4,137 | 2,305 | 1,728 | 635.3 | 538 | |
| January 2016 | 4,214 | 2,406 | 1,688 | 666.8 | 540 | |
| January 2015 | 4,028 | 2,348 | 1,541 | 634.9 | 539 | |
| January 2014 | 3,758 | 2,241 | 1,374 | 553.2 | 541 | |
| January 2013 | 3,548 | 2,191 | 1,193 | 473.1 | 540 | |
| January 2012 | 3,441 | 2,191 | 1,089 | 474.8 | 536 | |
| January 2011 | 3,293 | 2,222 | 936 | 400.9 | 525 | |
| January 2010 | 3,406 | 2,274 | 873 | 364.0 | 517 | |

== Logos and marketing ==
Next logo used from 1991 to 2007

Next logo used from 2007 to 23 March 2022

Until circa 1991, Next used a lower case Courier-style typeface in black against a white background for its logo. This was replaced by the capitalised "NEXT" logo in a Roman-serif style type face. There were some variations of this such as the logo with each letter of "NEXT" in an individual square and in some stores in 2005/2006 had the Next logo in a varying blue and black background with "X's" printed on them, as opposed to the black background. In addition, some variations in typeface occurred during the logo's use – including similar fonts that had serifs positioned above the "T" crossbar, similar to Garamond and others that had more in common with Times New Roman. In 2007, a new "next" logo was introduced, although the previous logo continued to be used until stock was exhausted.

Next clothing often carries reference to the origins of the company in 1982 with use of "82" or "1982" as a design feature on clothes in all ranges. Prior to 2007, Next only advertised immediately prior to a sale, usually through brief television spots and newspaper advertising. In 2007, following a "disappointing" 7.2% fall in like for like sales, it announced it was investing "£17 million over the next three years to revive its existing stores and product offering", plus an additional £10m for marketing. Yasmin Le Bon who modelled in the first Next Directory in Spring 1988 featured in an on-line fashion show.

In September 2007, to celebrate its 25th anniversary, Next launched its first television campaign in twelve years named "Ali's Party" with the song "Suddenly I See" and starring Brazilian supermodel Alessandra Ambrosio. All extra casts were Next employees, otherwise nicknamed 'nextras'. A second advert featuring Ambrosio, was screened in November 2007 and the songs were regularly played instore during the campaign. An advert directed by Ben Watts and filmed on the banks of the River Seine was shown in September 2010 to reflect the season's Parisian chic styles. The soundtrack included "A Message to You, Rudy" by the Specials and the advert starred Brazilian model Emanuela de Paula and Spanish actor Jon Kortajarena.

== See also ==
- Wolfson family
