= Philippe Cramer =

Swiss and American designer (born 1970)

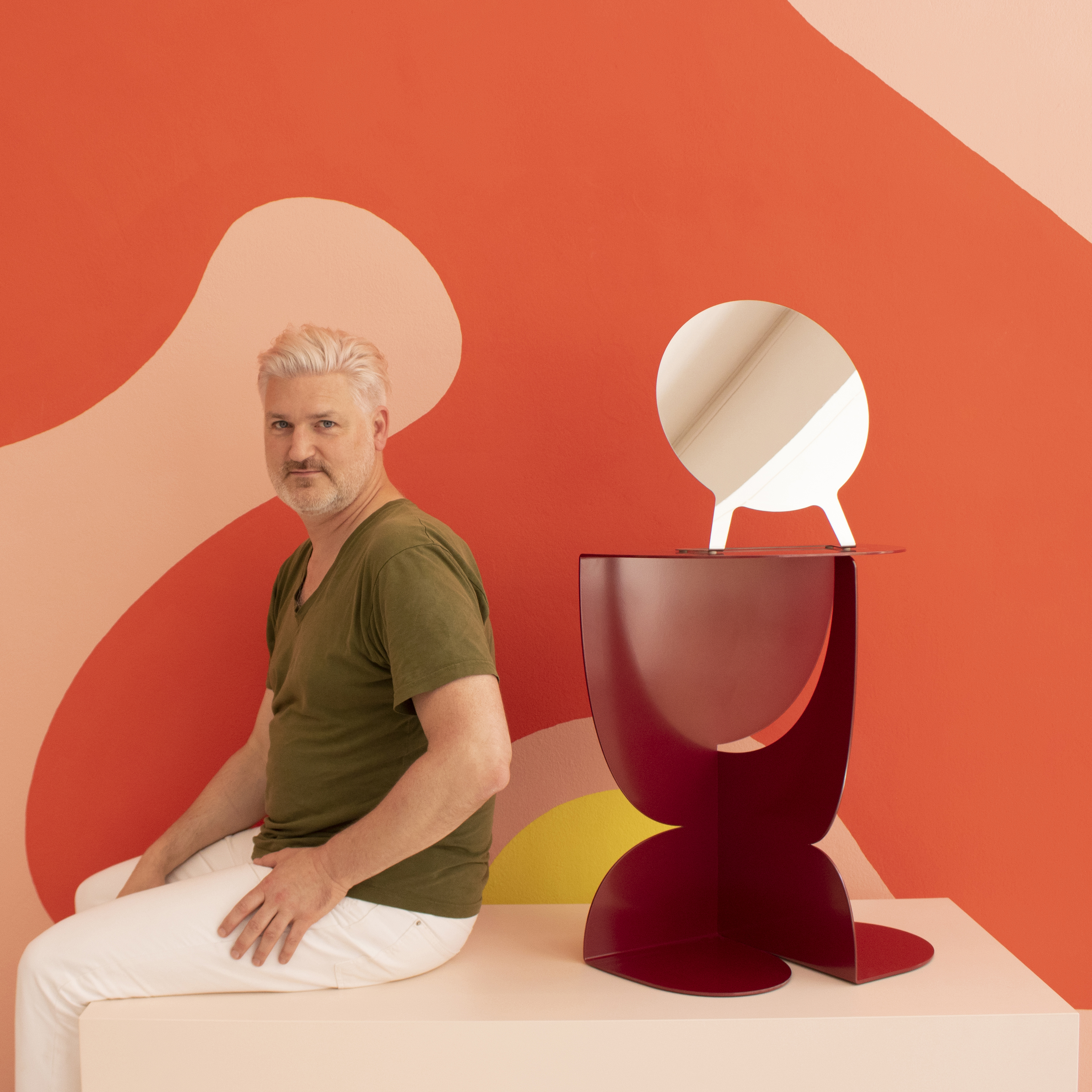
- Cramer in 2020
- Born: May 8, 1970 (age 56); New York, U.S
- Education: Parsons The New School for Design, New York, USA
- Known for: Furniture design, product design, jewelry design and art.
- Notable work: Baar, stool (2001); Randogne, family of lamps (2004); Andrienne, console table (2006); Captromancie, wall mobile (2019)
- Website: http://www.philippecramer.com/

Philippe Cramer (born May 8, 1970) is a Swiss and American artist whose work focuses on bridging fine art with functional art.

== Biography ==
Cramer was born in New York City and grew up in Geneva. He studied in London at the Sotheby's Institute of Art. He then lived in Paris and New York, where he graduated from Parsons The New School for Design. He lives and works in Geneva.

== Career ==
Cramer founded his studio in 2001 with the idea of developing a design brand producing limited editions of Swiss made furniture and home accessories. In 2003, he opened his studio in Geneva's Art District, designing, manufacturing and selling to an art and design oriented public. Two years later, the American company Bernardt Design launched Cramer's first furniture line for the US market. That same year, the Museum of Modern Art in New York selected several of his creation for its online and city design stores. He has since worked for institutions and private clients as well as architectural studios, notably for Dom Pérignon, Georg Jensen, Hermès petit h, and Made.com.

A follower of the slow design movement, Cramer is also aware of the social and environmental impact of his products and uses indigenous and sustainable materials wherever possible. He mandates local artisans who revive ancestral techniques in order to produce his objects. Sensitive to the notion of honest design, Cramer looks for the most responsible solutions to create products which are as beautiful as they are simple and sensual. This proximity to local industry, is also reflected in the names he gives his products, often inspired by Swiss mountains, rivers or villages.

Cramer is regularly invited to teach classes, conduct workshops or act as a critic in design schools across Switzerland including the Haute école d'art et de design in Geneva and the Ecole cantonale d'art of Lausanne. He also has been a regular contributor to the Swiss daily Le Temps and the architecture magazine Espaces Contemporains.

The Geneva Museum of Art and History gave Cramer "carte blanche" in an exhibition that he titled "L'Ornement Jamais". The works have been integrated into the Geneva state heritage collections and the tapestry is part of the museum's permanent exhibition. Other institutional collection have works by Cramer: Maison Tavel, Musée de l'Ariana and MUDAC.

Several exhibitions have been dedicated to Philippe Cramer's work, notably: ArtCurial, Swiss Cultural Center of Milan, the Audi Foundation in Beyrout, Gallery S. Bensimon in Paris, Galerie Caroline Freymond in Gstaad, the Spazio Setmani in MIlan, the Audi Foundation in Beyrouth, Sotheby's in Geneva and the Lapidarium museum in Prague. Philippe Cramer's bibliography includes "The New Jewelers" by Olivier Dupon (Thames & Hudson, 2012), "Décor, Design et Industrie" by Alexandre Fiette (Somogy editions, 2010) and "MAH Les Collections du Musée d'art et d'histoire de Genève" (Favre editions, 2019).

He is a member of the Swiss label group.

Cramer has designed the awards for the Young Activists Summit at the Palais des Nations in Geneva. Organized by the United Nations Office in Geneva, Radio Télévision Suisse (RTS) and dev.tv, this event rewarded six young female activists with inspiring backgrounds and achievements. He has also designed the awards for the Fondation Louis-Jeantet prize for medicine.

Profiles of Cramer and photographs of his creations have been published in many leading magazines and newspapers such as V Magazine, Elle Deco, Wallpaper, Elle decoration, AD France, L'Officiel, Le Temps, the Financial Times, Maisons et ambiances, Agefi Immo, Tribune des Arts, Metropolis, Hôtel President Wilson. He has been interviewed for Swiss Television.

During artgenève 2022, Cramer presented his first NFT serie named "Apotropaic Amulets". These 6 digital artworks in GIF format were minted in an edition of 28 and dropped in April 2022. Cramer then launched his digital gallery in the metaverse called "the Cramerverse" in October 2022.

== Exhibitions ==
- MAH, "Pas besoin d'un dessin", Geneva, 2022
- ArtGenève, Geneva, 2022-2020-2019-2018-2017
- Kiscelli Muzeum, Budapest, 2021
- Maison Tavel, Geneva, 2019
- Collectible Fair, Brussels, 2019
- Lapidarium, Prague, 2019
- Gallery Ormond Editions, Zürich, 2018
- Sotheby's Art à porter, Geneva, 2018
- Audi Mosaic Museum, Beirut, 2017
- Gallery S. Bensimon, Paris, 2012

== Articles ==
- Von Westersheimb, Kay (2006-06-01). "Balancing Act". Elle Decoration UK. pp. 130–140.
- Vinson, Nick (2007-08-04). "Touches of Glass". The Financial Times, House & Home. p. 9.
- Hyde, Mireille (2005-02-01). "Clear Intentions". Metropolis. p. 50.
- Bauer, Sacha (2001-11-01). "Crossover". Vogue Germany. p. 194.
- Mancilla, Julie (2007-11-01). "Dom Pérignon - Sylvie Fleury & Philippe Cramer". The Fake Magazine. Archived from the original on 2007-11-12.
- Blanc, Valérie (2007-09-01). "Le Design accessible de Philippe Cramer" (in French). Coté Maison.
- Fox, Annie (2007-08-19). "Get Addicted". Lifelounge.
- Fortunati, Lucien (2018-11-02). "Philippe Cramer crée des pièces pour Hermès". Tribune de Genève.
- Dumont, Etienne (2018-09-16). "Design/ Le genevois Philippe Cramer crée pour le petit h d'Hermès". BILAN.
