= Joseph Hepworth (tailor) =

English businessman (1834–1911)

- Born: 1834; Lindley in Huddersfield
- Died: 1911 (aged 76–77); Harrogate
- Occupation: Businessman

Joseph Hepworth (1834–1911) was the clothing manufacturer who founded Joseph Hepworth & Son, a company which grew to become the United Kingdom's largest clothing manufacturer and which is now known as Next plc.

== Career ==
Born at Lindley in Huddersfield, Joseph Hepworth left school at ten to join George Walker's Mill in Leeds in 1844.

In 1864 Joseph Hepworth went into business with his brother-in-law James Rhodes as a tailor in Leeds. By 1881 their factory in Wellington Street employed 500 people and, unusually for the time, made all three pieces of a gentlemen's three-piece suit. In the 1880s they innovated further, establishing shops to sell their suits direct to the public. By 1890 they employed 2,000 operatives who sold their stock through 107 shops.

Joseph Hepworth died in Harrogate in 1911, and within 6 years of his death Joseph Hepworth & Son was the largest clothing manufacturer in the United Kingdom. He donated several paintings to Leeds Art Gallery including work by Hubert von Herkomer in 1899.

== Family ==
Hepworth married Sarah Hepworth, née Rhodes on 8 December 1855 they went on to have three sons and four daughters.
