= Seraphine (company) =

British maternity fashion label and store

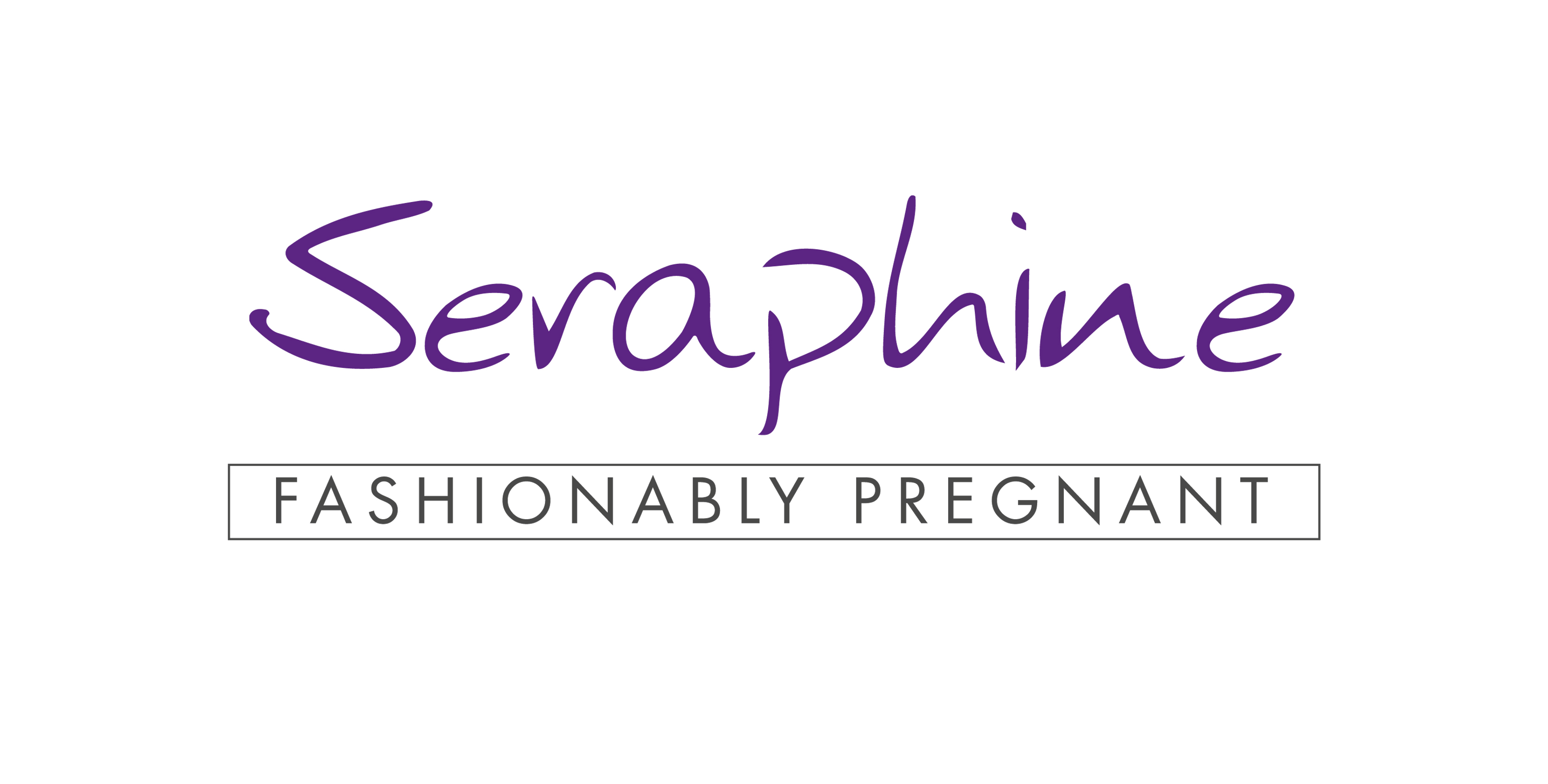
- Company type: Private company
- Industry: Fashion and apparel
- Founded: 2002
- Founder: Cecile Reinaud
- Headquarters: United Kingdom
- Area served: International
- Products: Maternity clothing
- Owner: Next plc
- Website: www.seraphine.com

Seraphine is an London-based maternity fashion brand. The company was founded by French-born designer Cecile Reinaud in 2002.

The maternity label received worldwide attention when Kate Middleton was photographed in a Seraphine dress for the first official family portrait with Prince George. Seraphine has also been worn by celebrities such as Angelina Jolie, Kate Winslet, Christina Aguilera, and Marion Cotillard. In 2015 and 2020, Seraphine received the Queen's Award for Enterprise, the United Kingdom's highest official accolade for businesses.

In 2020, Seraphine generated £28 million in turnover. Seraphine officially went into administration on 7 July 2025.

In July 2025, Seraphine was acquired by Next plc.

== History ==
Seraphine was founded in 2002 by Cecile Reinaud. Originally from Paris, Reinaud studied business in France before moving to the UK to work for advertising agencies including JWT. Reinaud had the idea to start Seraphine after she was approached by multiple friends asking her to tailor their clothes during their pregnancies. Her first design for the label was a pair of maternity jeans with a special lining and flexible fit to accommodate pregnant women.

The first Seraphine store opened on Kensington Church Street in West London in 2002. In 2007, Seraphine opened its second store in Hampstead.

Seraphine introduced its Luxe Collection in 2012, a line of maternity fashions for red-carpet events along with bridal gowns and outwear designed for women during and post-pregnancy. Seraphine opened another store in central London on Marylebone High Street in 2013, and in 2014, the company opened a store on Northcote Road in Clapham.

In November 2014, the company opened a 1,650 square foot store in New York City. It is their first flagship store in the United States and is located on West Broadway. In 2015, Seraphine relocated its London flagship store from Kensington Church Street in West London to Kensington High Street. That same year, the company opened a location in Leeds Victoria Quarter and another New York store on Madison Avenue.

In November 2015, Seraphine launched The Diana Collection, a line of baby clothing produced in collaboration with the Diana Award charity. The company opened a flagship store in Dubai's Festival City Mall in April 2016.

In 2017, the company opened its flagship French store in Place St Sulpice in Paris and a year later, they opened another on Avenue Victor Hugo near the Champs Elysees.

In March 2019, the company opened a store in New Delhi.

== Overview ==
The Seraphine maternity line includes more than 200 styles of clothing for women during and after pregnancy. The designer collections feature wardrobe basics, denims, office attire, knitwear, outerwear, and evening gowns.

The company also operates internationally through online sales and stockists such as Pea in the Pod, Galeries Lafayette and John Lewis as well as more than 80 independent clothing boutiques across the United States and Canada.

== In popular culture ==
Seraphine received international attention in 2013 after the Duchess of Cambridge, Kate Middleton, was photographed wearing the designer brand. The particular dress Kate Middleton was wearing, the Jolene Knot Front Dress, sold out within two hours. Middleton also wore Seraphine during her second pregnancy when she visited New York City in December 2014, as well as in the United Kingdom in early 2015. The Duchess continued to wear Seraphine maternity clothes throughout her pregnancy in 2018, choosing a Seraphine maternity dress to meet the King and Queen of Norway on the official royal tour of Sweden and Norway. She also wore Seraphine for her first official appearance with Meghan Markle at the inaugural Royal Foundation Forum.

== Collaboration ==
Seraphine has collaborated over the years with several philanthropic partners, running campaigns to raise money for charities supporting mothers and babies. From 2005 to 2006, the company ran a campaign in collaboration with UK pregnancy charity Tommy's, supported by actress Anna Friel and singer Jamelia, in which Seraphine donated 100 percent of the profits from the sales of its baby scan t-shirt. The campaign raised over £40,000 for Tommy's.

In 2014, Seraphine launched its 'Just For Love' campaign in collaboration with the Los Angeles based charity Baby2Baby. The campaign encouraged women to upload a picture to their online gallery and in exchange Seraphine donated $1 for every image uploaded. The campaign raised over $1000 for Baby2Baby.

In 2015, the company launched a charity t-shirt campaign, supported by singer Sophie Ellis-Bextor in aid of Tommy's. The campaign raised £50,000, and all proceeds went towards Tommy's' miscarriage research centre.

== Recognition ==
Seraphine has been recognized through various awards and accolades.

- The company received the 'Best Specialist E-Tailer' award from the fashion business magazine Drapers in 2011.
- In 2012, the company received five awards at the Pregnancy & Baby Bloom Awards including ones for 'Best Evening Wear,' 'Best Nursing Top,' and 'Best Innovation.'
- Drapers awarded Seraphine's e-commerce website in 2014 for being the 'Best Multi-channel Retailer.'
- Seraphine was recognized by The Sunday Times "Fast Track 100 Ones To Watch" from 2014.
- The company was awarded the Queen's Award for Enterprise in 2015 after seeing a 35 percent growth in 2014.
- In 2018 Seraphine won gold in the 'Best Maternity Wear' category at the Absolutely Mama Awards.
- In 2020 Seraphine was awarded a second Queen's Award for Enterprise.
