= George (fashion label) =

Clothing brand

- Industry: Fashion
- Founded: 1989; 37 years ago
- Founder: George Davies
- Number of locations: 300+
- Owner: Asda
- Website: Official Webpage

George is a British mass market fashion label founded by George Davies for Asda. It is the second best-selling label in the United Kingdom.

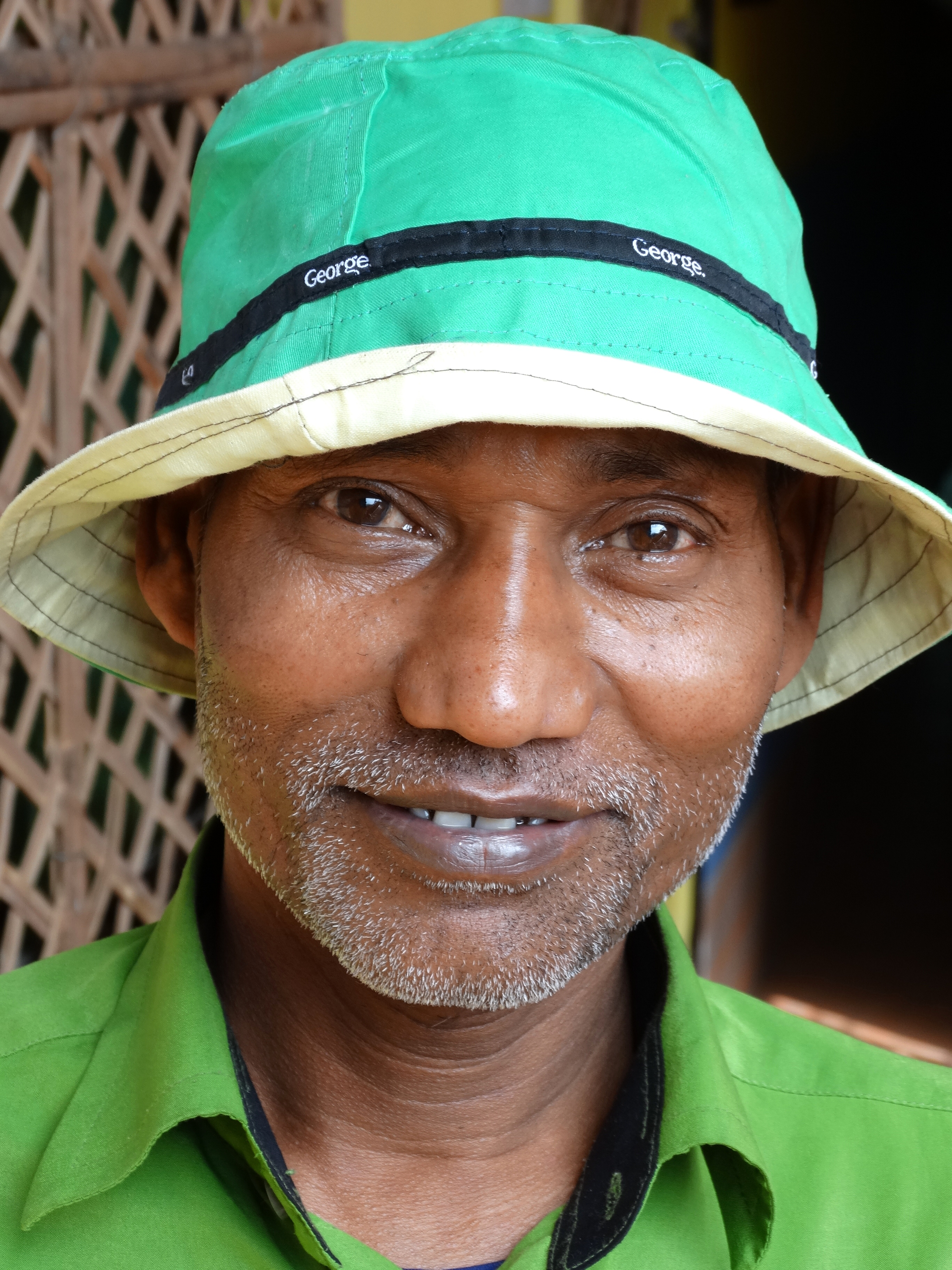
A Bengali man from Sylhet Division sporting a George bucket hat

== History ==
The George brand was founded in 1989 as a partnership between English fashion designer George Davies and Asda. The latter had recruited the high-street designer for its grocery store brand to help shoppers avoid high street.

Asda and George were sold to Walmart in 1999, which led to the expansion of the George brand into Walmart stores.

In February 2022, Asda and George were bought by TDR Capital for 6.8 billion pounds. Plans to spin George off into an independent brand have been leaked, but those plans have been denied by the acquiring firm.

== Reception ==
The brand is a huge success in the UK, but ultimately is considered a failure in Canada and the United States, as the British success could not be replicated across the Atlantic.

The brand targeted women aged 30-50 years when it was rolled out at Walmart. This demographic wasn’t as receptive to the brand in North America as it was in the UK.

Walmart attempted to fix the issue by targeting a wider demographic by consolidating other labels under one brand. In Canada, this included popular brands such as 725 Originals, B.U.M., and Pennmans.

By 2018, weak sales forced the brand to shrink to just a menswear line. This only impacted their Canada and US lines, which had been preparing to sell the brand in advance. It was split up into four separate brands under Walmart.
