= Lipsy =

Women's and children's apparel

Lipsy Limited
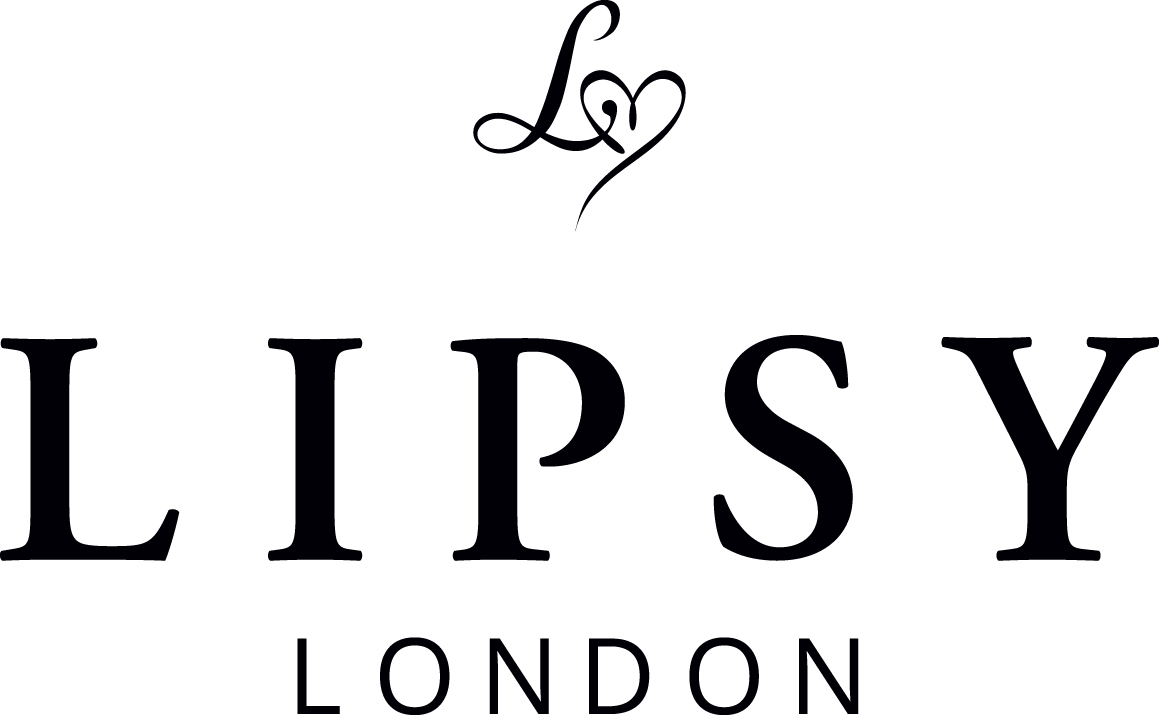
- Type: Private limited company
- Industry: Clothing industry; Retail
- Founded: 1988 in the UK
- Headquarters: London
- Products: Clothing; Fashion accessory; Beauty Product; Homewares
- Parent: Next plc
- Website: next.co.uk/lipsy

Lipsy Limited, also known as Lipsy London, is a British fashion and cosmetic retailer. The company sells women's and children's apparel, accessories, beauty products and homeware through external websites and in-store sales.

== History ==
The Lipsy brand was founded in 1988 and is based in the UK. As of 2021, the brand is sold online, in 40 Next stores, and wholesale and franchise operations.

The brand's website was launched in 2006. In 2008, Lipsy was purchased by the fashion chain Next plc for £17.3 million. In 2011, the company partnered with Alhokair Group to open Lipsy stores in Saudi Arabia, Jordan, Egypt, Morocco, Kazakhstan, Azerbaijan, and Georgia. Lipsy was also sold internationally at that time through Bloomingdales, Robinsons (Singapore), and Myer (Australia).

In January 2018, Lipsy stopped selling through its own website and made the decision to focus on sales through external websites, Next and ASOS, and in-store sales. As of that time, the company had 50 stores in the UK and 31 worldwide.

In 2019, Lipsy acquired Fabled by Marie Claire, a beauty brand. In 2021, Lipsy launched a womenswear brand, Love & Roses.

Several celebrities have been the face of the label, including Michelle Keegan, Pixie Lott, Alex Gerrard, Ariana Grande, Kelly Rohrbach, Kate Upton, and Amy Jackson. Lipsy also worked with Kim, Khloé, and Kourtney Kardashian and carried the Kardashian Kollections.
