= Made.com =

British e-commerce company

MADE.COM Group Plc
- Trade name: MADE.COM
- Type: Public
- Traded as: LSE: MADE
- Industry: Retailer
- Founded: March 2010
- Founders: Ning Li, Brent Hoberman, Julien Callede, Chloe Macintosh
- Defunct: 9 November 2022
- Fate: Administration; assets sold to Next Plc
- Headquarters: London, England
- Number of locations: 7 showrooms
- Area served: United Kingdom, Ireland, France, Belgium, Germany, Austria, The Netherlands, Switzerland and Spain
- Key people: Susanne Given (Chair); Nicola Thompson (CEO)
- Products: Furniture and Homeware
- Revenue: ▲£371 million (2021)
- Number of employees: 650 (2021)
- Website: www.made.com

Made.com was a British e-commerce company based in London that designed and sold furniture and home accessories online. The company was founded in 2010 by serial entrepreneur Ning Li and Brent Hoberman, together with Julien Callède and Chloe Macintosh.

It had offices and warehouses across Europe and Asia and operated in seven European markets including the United Kingdom, Ireland, France, Belgium, Germany, Austria, Netherlands, Switzerland and Spain.

In May 2022, it acquired the online homeware marketplace Trouva.

On 9 November 2022, Made.com went into administration and some of its assets were acquired by the British multinational clothing, footwear and home products retailer, Next plc.

== History ==
Made.com was launched in March 2010 with £2.5 million funding and later received £6m in series B financing.

In January 2013, Made.com launched in France led by digital entrepreneur David Vanek. In September 2013, Made.com launched in Italy. In the same month Philippe Chainieux, formerly CEO of Meetic/ Match.com Europe, was appointed as managing director and Made.com aired its first TV ad in the UK, Great Design Direct From The Makers.

In October 2013, Made.com was selected as one of the initial 25 new UK businesses by the British government's Future Fifty programme of high-growth technology companies that the government wanted to help to expand and float. In December 2013, Made.com co-founder and former CEO, Ning Li, accompanied the prime minister, David Cameron, and other UK business delegates on a major trade trip to China.

In September 2014, Made.com launched in the Netherlands and six months later, in March 2015, MADE launched the site in Germany led by Gloria Maria Reuss. In March 2015, Chloe Macintosh stepped down as creative director.

In July 2015, Made.com raised $60m (£38m) in growth capital from Partech and Eight Roads Ventures to accelerate its expansion into Europe.

In January 2017, founder Ning Li announced that he would be stepping down as chief executive of the company, but would remain involved as vice chairman of the board. The announcement came as the company reached £100m in sales.

In March 2018, after reporting another 40% year on year sales growth, Made.com raised a further £40m equity funding from institutional investors in order to consolidate its market position in Europe.

In May 2021, Made.com announced plans to list on the London Stock Exchange and raise approximately £100 million by selling new shares.

In June 2021, Made.com completed its IPO on the London Stock Exchange, with a market capitalisation of £775 million.

In February 2022, Made.com announced that CEO Philippe Chainieux had stepped down from his role as CEO with immediate effect for family reasons. In March 2022, the company confirmed that Nicola Thompson would take the position of permanent CEO.

Even though Made.com experienced a rise in sales at the beginning of 2020s, its sales began to drop significantly in 2022, mostly due to chain supply problems, the cost-of-living crisis, and the incoming recession. The company was put up for sale. In October 2022, Made.com stopped taking any new orders after the talks for finding a new buyer failed, which led the company to the brink of collapse. On 1 November 2022, the company's shares on the stock market were suspended.

On 9 November 2022, Made.com went into administration. Its brand name, website and intellectual property were bought by fashion and furniture retailer Next. However, no staff were retained, leading to approximately 500 job losses.

In August 2023, Next launched the new Made.com website, replacing the redirect to a landing page hosted on Next's website. The new Made.com website and app is hosted using the Next Total Platform, joining other sites like Gap, Reiss, Victoria Secret and JoJo Maman Bebe.

== Operations ==
Made.com did not own any of its factories, instead commissioning factories to meet its orders.

The company's head office was based in London and it also operated regional offices in China and Vietnam. In addition, it operated warehouse and distribution facilities at London Gateway and in Ipswich. Its UK customer services department as also headquartered in Ipswich, Suffolk.

In 2012, sales grew by 200% compared to 2011 and in 2012 it hired between one and two new employees per week. Made.com opened its Ninth Floor Showroom, in Notting Hill during London Design Festival 2012. On 16 December 2013, Made.com opened the doors to its showroom at Redbrick Mill in Batley. In January 2015, MADE opened its flagship showroom in Soho, London (100 Charing Cross Road). In April 2019, the flagship showroom in Soho was tripled in size to more than 1,100 m^{2} (12,000 sq ft).

In March 2020, the company confirmed that they were withdrawing from Denmark and Sweden to focus operation on its key markets, although it did not rule out returning in the future.

== Business model ==
Made.com streamlined the furniture design and manufacture process allowing it to take products from design to sale in as little as four months. Made.com released two new collections a week. The company minimised overheads by selling online, grouping orders of the same item, not owning its factories and building close working relationships with factories and designers. Its website showcased furniture designs and encouraged people to vote for their favourite. Crowd-sourced designs went into production and people who voted could go on to purchase them should they reach production. Orders were then placed directly with the manufacturer for mass production. Once produced, these orders were shipped and then dispatched to customers. Unfortunately, this sometimes lead to significant shipping delays of more than several months for products.

== Designers ==
Made.com collaborated with a number of designers including Steuart Padwick, Busetti Garuti Redaelli, James Harrison, Nina Campbell, Ian Archer, Philip Colbert, Ilaria Marelli, Philippe Cramer, Genevieve Bennett, John Stefanidis and Alison Cork.

In 2013, Made.com partnered with the Design Museum in a competition to design two-seater sofa as part of its Future Is Here exhibition. The winning entry was put into production.
