= Joules (clothing) =

British fashion retailer

- Industry: Retail
- Founded: 1989; 37 years ago
- Founder: Tom Joule
- Headquarters: Market Harborough, England
- Number of locations: 123 stores, remainder are stockists
- Brands: Joules, Little Joule, Baby Joule
- Number of employees: 1,823
- Parent: Next plc
- Website: joules.com

Joules is a British clothing company which sells clothing and homeware products inspired by British country lifestyles. Its founder Tom Joule described its business model in 2011 as creating clothing with "colour and fun and entertainment".

Established by selling clothing at country shows, the company established its own clothing line in 1999 and began to open shops in the 2000s. As of 2021, the company had 133 stores and annual revenue of £199.0 million.

== History ==
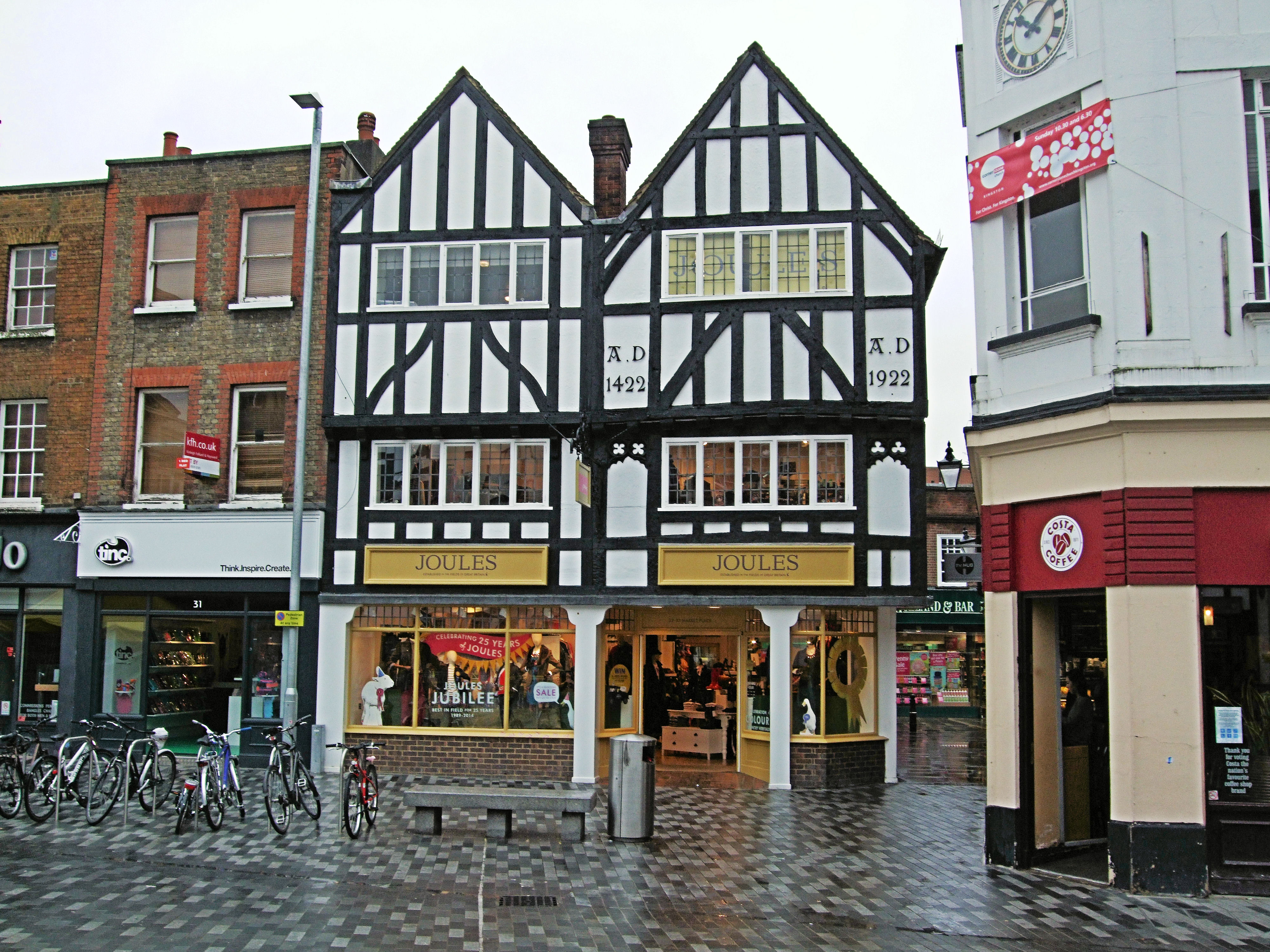
A Joules shop in Kingston upon Thames

Originally established as Joule & Sons in 1977 by Ian Joule, his son Tom took over the business in 1989. Joule & Son originally sold branded clothing and accessories at equestrian and country shows. Seeing a gap in the market for colourful country clothing as an alternative to traditional styles, Tom ordered 100 pairs of pink Wellington boots to be manufactured, which sold out almost immediately. Tom identified a gap in the market for stylish country clothing as an alternative to traditional pieces.

In 1994, Joule & Son rebranded as Joules. The company's strategy changed to sell branded goods at minor fairs, and by 1997 had experienced success in selling branded outdoor clothing at bigger shows. In March 1999, Joules premiered its first clothing collection under its own name. In September 2000, Joules opened their first store next door to the café owned by his father in Market Harborough, Leicestershire.

With the 2001 United Kingdom foot-and-mouth outbreak, almost all the shows that Joules intended to sell at were cancelled. In response, the company pivoted to selling clothing directly to retailers. The company's mail order catalogue business was launched in 2002, with its website following in 2003. Joules launched Little Joule in 2008, designed for 2–12 year olds. Following the popularity of Little Joule, Baby Joule was established in 2009.

Between 2003 and 2010, the company saw turnover increase from £3m to £50m, with mail order and internet sales accounting for a fifth of turnover by 2010. By early 2011, Joules saw its high street network rise to a total of 52 stores. During May 2016, Joules completed a successful stock exchange listing on the Alternative Investment Market. The business was valued around £140m.

2017 and 2018 saw further growth and Joules had sales of £185m. In 2019 a new chairman and CEO joined Joules. It was decided to hand the creative and product responsibility to others, leading to Tom Joule’s departure during Christmas of 2019. In November 2022, Joules entered into administration, in part due to the challenging UK economic environment which negatively impacted consumer confidence and disposable income.

On 1 December 2022, 19 branches nationwide closed for the final time.

In December 2022, Tom Joule returned to the business he founded in 1989. In a deal that saved 100s of jobs, Tom bought Joules out of administration in partnership with Next.

Today, Joules has a turnaround plan that focuses on making new products that appeal to both its loyal customers and a new, younger audience that likes preppy styles. Tom's wife, Alice Joule, is the creative director.

== Products ==
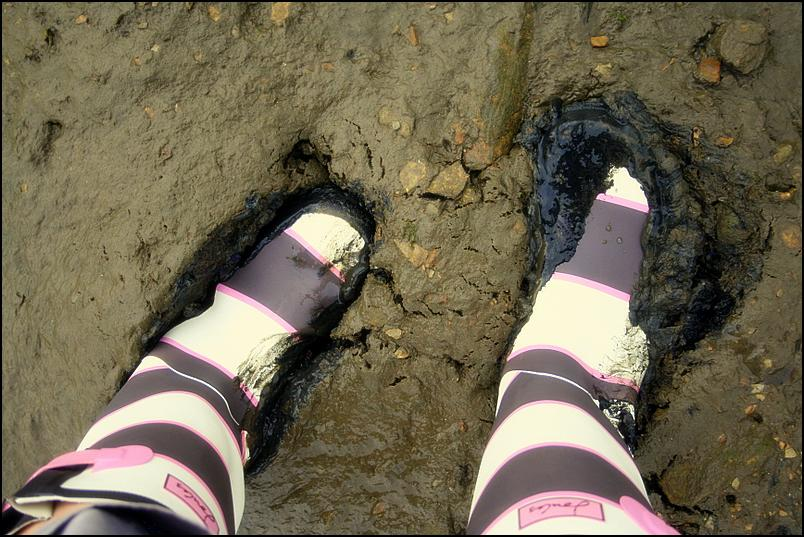
Multicoloured wellington boots made by Joules

The Joules collection includes contemporary men's, women's and children's clothing, footwear and accessories. It began with wellies, country-inspired clothing and polo shirts and although these products still form a key part of the range, much of the collection is now fashion-focused. The Little Joule brand is aimed at the children's clothing market and was launched in 2008, followed by Baby Joule in 2009. In 2019, Joules announced a partnership with Peter Rabbit for its kids range.

Joules started selling home and garden products in 2013 and in 2014 launched an optical line in partnership with Vision Express. In 2015 Joules launched a range of home fragrances and toiletries.

== Stores ==
As of 2026 Joules has 56 stores, including 11 outlet stores, with a new flagship in Market Harborough, as well as a number of stores in market towns and coastal locations across England.

Joules has also opened stores within six Center Parcs locations across the UK and Ireland.

== Recession ==
In March 2020, Joules asked the government to do more to support UK retail staff during the COVID-19 pandemic in the United Kingdom. The company saw a decline in revenue at its 124 UK and Ireland outlets following the outbreak of COVID-19 in the UK.

In 2022, the economic situation worsened even more, with many consumers cutting their costs in the face of soaring costs of living. This caused significantly less sales for Joules, which prompted the company to start talks with potential investors to secure extra funds. However, the talks failed, and the company went into formal administration on 16 November 2022, putting 1,600 jobs at risk.

On 1 December 2022, a last minute bid by NEXT PLC secured the company with only 19 stores closing. Since then a number of other stores have been closed, leaving very few High Street stores left and some outlet stores.
