= Russell & Bromley =

British footwear and handbag retailer founded in 1873

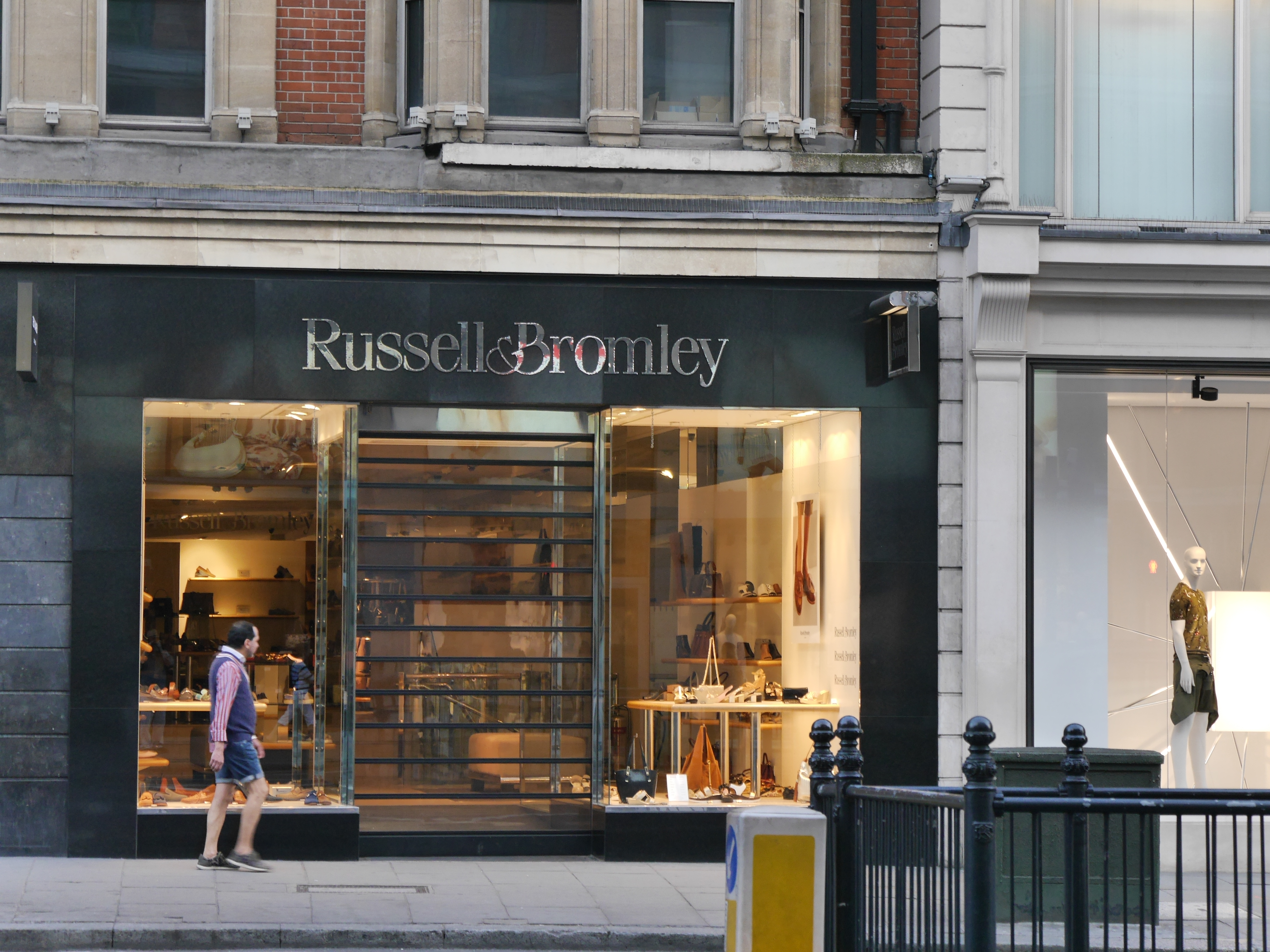
- Brompton Road, London, June 2016
- Type: Private
- Founded: 1873; 153 years ago in Lewes, East Sussex, England
- Headquarters: Bromley, London, England
- Number of locations: 3 stores
- Owner: Next plc
- Website: russellandbromley.co.uk

Russell & Bromley is a luxury British footwear and handbag retailer founded in 1873 and owned by Next plc. After operating 43 stores and two concessions in the UK, it currently maintains only three stores in that country.

== History ==
Russell & Bromley began in 1873 when George Bromley, a shoemaker, married his employer Albion Russell's daughter Elizabeth in Lewes, East Sussex, England. Elizabeth's grandfather John Clifford Russell had established a shoemaking business in 1820. The family store in Eastbourne became the first to carry the Russell and Bromley name above the door in 1880.

In 1898 Frederick, George and Elizabeth's son, joined the business and opened a store in Tonbridge, Kent. He then founded an additional store in Sevenoaks, which started an expansion programme of opening additional stores and purchasing smaller independent retailers. In 1905 Frederick moved its operations from Eastbourne to Bromley in Kent. Frederick retired in 1936 and handed the business to his sons Frederick Keith (known as Toby) and Michael. By the outbreak of the Second World War the company had 20 branches.

In 1947 the brothers opened their first store on Bond Street in the West End of London, which saw the change of business focus to high end retailer. In 1968 this was completed by the closure of a quarter of the branches to concentrate on the higher end of the market. The company has since progressed from selling only footwear and now includes ladies handbags and men's belts as part of its range.

In 2022 it was announced that the business would open its first store outside the UK on Grafton Street in Dublin.

In 2025, Next plc and Modella Capital were shown to have an interest in the retailer, if the deal went ahead then Next would acquire the brand and website of the retailer while Modella would take over the stores and liquidate them, ending the retailer's more than 150 years of being in the high street. In January 2026, it was announced that Next had acquired Russell & Bromley through a pre-pack insolvency process. The transaction involved the purchase of the brand and selected assets, with administrators continuing to assess the future of the retailer’s remaining physical store estate, 3 stores (2 in London and 1 in Stone) were also acquired by Next, with Modella being appointed by administrator Interpath to liquidate the remaining stores, its website was also not included with the brand now being on Next's website.

In January 2026 Next has purchased the Russell & Bromley brand and property for £2.5 million.
