= Lastminute.com =

British travel company

lastminute.com
- Founded: 2 September 1998; 28 years ago
- Headquarters: London, England, UK
- Founders: Martha Lane Fox; Brent Hoberman
- Key people: Alessandro Petazzi(CEO)
- Industry: Travel
- Parent: Lastminute.com Group
- Website: www.lastminute.com
- Launched: October 1998; 28 years ago
- Current status: Trading

lastminute.com is an online travel and leisure retailer.

The company was founded by Martha Lane Fox and Brent Hoberman in 1998 and was a part of the UK internet boom of the late 1990s, part of the dot-com bubble and trading on the London Stock Exchange under the symbol 'LMN'.

In May 2015, lastminute.com was acquired from Sabre by the Bravofly Rumbo Group which rebranded as lastminute.com Group.

== History ==
=== From foundation to flotation: April 1998 to March 2000 ===
lastminute.com was founded in London by Martha Lane Fox and Brent Hoberman in 1998 to offer late holiday deals online. The founders were colleagues at media strategy consultants Spectrum.

By January 2000, the site had more than 500,000 regular users and its offerings had expanded to include travel, gifts and entertainment, with a specialisation in selling distressed inventory.

Prior to its flotation, the company raised a further $31m. It opened offices in Paris, Munich and Stockholm. During the ten months ending December 1999, the company handled £37m of transactions, which generated £330,000 of income.

The shares floated on the London Stock Exchange on 14 March 2000. The shares were placed at 380p, valuing the company at £571m. The price rose on the first day of trading to 511p, giving a valuation of £768m, before falling back to 492.5p later in the day. The paper wealth of the founders of the business went up to around £300m.

Two hundred and fifty thousand private investors had applied for shares in the flotation. 33m shares – 25% of the company – were being offered for sale, the bulk to institutional investors. Private applicants received just 35 shares each.

=== Public listed company: March 2000 to May 2005 ===
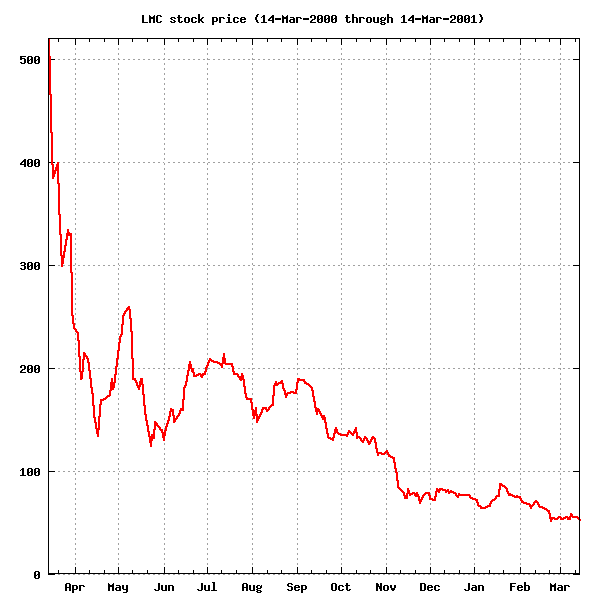
lastminute.com share price (14 March 2000 through 14 March 2001)

Two weeks after listing, the share price had dropped to 270p. In the first week of April, the shares dipped below 190p, half the issue price. On Monday, 17 April 2000, after the biggest ever one-day fall in the New York stock market the preceding Friday, £35bn were wiped off the value of the London Stock Exchange. By now, lastminute.com was trading at 30% of its flotation price.

Its share price was rising again when the firm announced its first quarter's results on 6 May 2000. The company had handled £7.16m of transactions, up 68% compared with the previous period. During this period, the company had invested in a new version of the website as well as international expansions. These factors pushed pre-tax losses up from £6m to £11m. The market responded to the better-than-expected figures and the shares closed the day up 8p at 245p. Two weeks later, however, the shares closed at 141p, as concerns over dotcom stocks increased, after boo.com went into liquidation.

The introduction of a new website – allowing late deals to be targeted according to users' personal tastes – was delayed but finally unveiled on 27 November 2000.

Meanwhile, on 14 August, lastminute.com announced the acquisition of Degriftour, a French online travel agent, for £27.1m cash and 19.7m new shares, worth 162p each at the previous day's close.

Allan Leighton, the former head of Asda and president of the European division of Wal-Mart, joined the company as non-executive chairman on 20 October. The role was unpaid but he was granted options over 1m shares at a strike price of 137.5p. The market reacted with a 9p drop in the share price to 128p. The firm's shares sank below 100p for the first time on 8 November and closed at 80p on 10 November. Full year results to 30 September 2000, announced on 4 December, were slightly ahead of expectations. Losses increased from £4.5m to £35.7m, while transaction value increased from £2.64m to £34.2m, excluding transactions by Degriftour. The company generated more revenue from interest payments than from ongoing business activities. Shares rose 4.9% to 75p. In November 2001 the company reported a £54m loss.

In November 2003, Lane-Fox announced that she would step down as managing director at the end of the year – in which the company made its first pre-tax profit of £200,000, short of analyst expectations of £4m. The company was acquired in 2005 by Sabre Holdings, owner of online travel company Travelocity, paying 165p per share, a 57 per cent premium to the share price prior to the takeover talks, but less than half the flotation price. The deal valued the company at £577 million.

Up until 2005, the company had not made a net profit since it floated five years earlier. In February 2005, it reported pre-tax losses of £26.5m. Hoberman stayed with the business until spring 2006 when he handed over the reins as CEO to Ian McCaig.

=== Post-acquisition ===
Following acquisition, a number of Sabre/Travelocity executives joined lastminute.com between 2005 and 2007, including Ed Kamm (former CFO of Travelocity, who was to succeed McCaig as CEO at the end of 2010), Damon Tassone, Josh Feuerstein (who are now co-founders at Intent Media) and Arun Rajan (now CTO at Zappos).

The team was further increased by the arrival of Brian Murphy to head up Holiday Autos and MedHotels (he had previously been at Hertz, Thomas Cook and American Express) Simon Thompson as CMO (who had previously been at Honda and Motorola and subsequently went to Apple), Joe Kenny from Cisco and Arnaldo Munoz from easyJet.

In April 2007, Coolgorilla released a downloadable version of the Talking Phrasebooks for Nokia and Sony Ericsson mobile devices with lastminute.com branding.

During 2008–2010, hires included Alistair Rodger (formerly Commercial Director at Hilton) and James Donaldson (who joined from News International to replace Kamm as CFO) and Mark Newton from AMEX.

It was the above teams of executives that led the business through a five-year period after the acquisition which was characterised by increased profitability and in January 2009, lastminute.com released nru ("near you") a GPS-based restaurant search application for Android in the UK. A US version was released in May 2009, together with restaurant review guide, Zagat.

In 2009, lastminute.com was among the first online players to offer limited inventory 'flash' sales which it branded 'WIGIGs' (When It's Gone It's Gone). During this period the company also divested itself of its travel agent 'bed booking bank' for hotels, MedHotels, which it sold to Thomas Cook for an undisclosed sum. The successful leisure car rental business, Holiday Autos, remained in the portfolio.

Structurally, the business also began to look quite different through the 2006–2010 period. Its technology hosting was moved to the US, offshore technology development became prevalent through use of Sabre's facilities in South America, North America and India and lastminute.com itself opened a new centre in Poland to handle much of its back-office and customer fulfilment functions.

=== 2011–2015 ===
In early 2011, lastminute.com launched a pan-European marketing campaign called 'Stories Start Here', to position the brand as an online leisure, entertainment and travel retailer.

More recently, the company's communications strategy focussed on a return to its 'last minute' roots, promoting the customer savings that can be achieved when booking at the last minute. A revisited focus on 'the weekend' has also been an important development for the company, which created a dedicated section of their website in August 2011, providing weekend-specific offers.

In August 2014, lastminute.com ranked in 6th place in a Travel Brand Index conducted by an independent market research firm.

In December 2014, the firm was bought by Bravofly Rumbo for £76 million, a fraction of the £600 million Sabre had paid for it in 2005.

=== 2015–2018 ===
In 2015, Bravofly Rumbo Group (SIX: BRG), changed its corporate name to lastminute.com over the course of the year. The change of the corporate name reflected the new brand strategy of the group, following the acquisition of lastminute.com. While the existing digital brands Bravofly, Volagratis, Rumbo and Jetcost continued to target online growth, lastminute.com will now become the core brand supported by increased marketing investments. An advertising campaign, with more than double the investment versus 2014, was launched early June and ran across three key markets – UK, France and Italy – representing 65% of revenues of the group at that time.

During the month of September 2016, the lastminute.com group, acquired WAYN, Where Are You Now?’ to implement a content factory within the Group and differentiate lastminute.com positioning against other online travel players. WAYN, the world's largest social travel network, was integrated with lastminute.com group's new media business, aiming to boost the ability to engage a young and captive audience with the addition of WAYN’S 20 million registered members and 2 million monthly unique visitors.

In November 2017, lastminute.com group announced the acquisition of hotelscan to diversify its metasearch value proposition. Founded in 2012, hotelscan has created a search engine for Hotels, Bed & Breakfasts, Hostels, Apartments and other types of accommodations, Its daily updated database has around 1.3 million properties, with data from over 100 online booking websites, provides travelers with relevant content to find room availability.

In December 2017, lastminute.com group decided to scale up its positioning in Germany and bought Comvel GmbH, founded 2004 in Munich, which operates the travel website weg.de, one of Germany's best-known online travel sites which had been a wholly owned subsidiary of ProSiebenSat.1 Group since January 2014. weg.de offers its customers the entire range of travel options, with its primary focus on package holidays and all-inclusive vacations.

== Criticism ==
In 2009, lastminute.com attracted much criticism on consumer sites and blogs regarding their association with highstreetmax.com, a brand owned by Adaptive Affinity, in turn owned by US corporation Vertrue. The company was accused of subjecting customers to negative option selling, whereby if they click or do not untick a certain box they find later that they were subject to unauthorised credit card withdrawals for membership schemes they had not signed up for, whose details they were not advised and whose supposed benefits they did not see. This attracted the attention of BBC Radio 4's consumer affairs programme You and Yours on 30 January 2008 and the consumer pages of the Daily Mirror in July 2008.

The firm responded by discontinuing the relationship with highstreetmax.com and saying, 'Once our customers leave our site they are given an option to sign-up for a third-party cash back programme. When they sign up within the terms and conditions it is made clear that further payments will be taken. However we have had some feedback from customers who have inadvertently signed up. On this basis we feel that it is the right thing to do to take this off our site.'

On 18 May 2020, Lastminute.com was listed 49th out of 53 Travel Companies in giving refunds for cancelled flights and refunds by Money Saving Expert Martin Lewis. They were given a Net Promoter Score (NPS) of -87 calculated by subtracting the percentage of respondents who rated their experience with the firm as 'Poor' from the percentage who rated their experience as 'Great'. The number who rated their experience as 'OK' is not factored in. Only 4 others out of 53 were given poorer scores.

In 2020, Lastminute.com and competitor GoToGate attracted criticism from consumer group Which? after the company failed to meet its promise to refund customers for Covid-impacted holidays. The online travel agent was investigated by the Competitions and Market Authority (CMA) in December 2020, as a result of this failure. A survey conducted by Which? in the same month ranked Lastminute.com as "the worst booking site in the UK", with the year "being an even worse bet, because of the way it has treated customers during the coronavirus pandemic".
