= Émile Reinaud =

French politician (1854–1924)

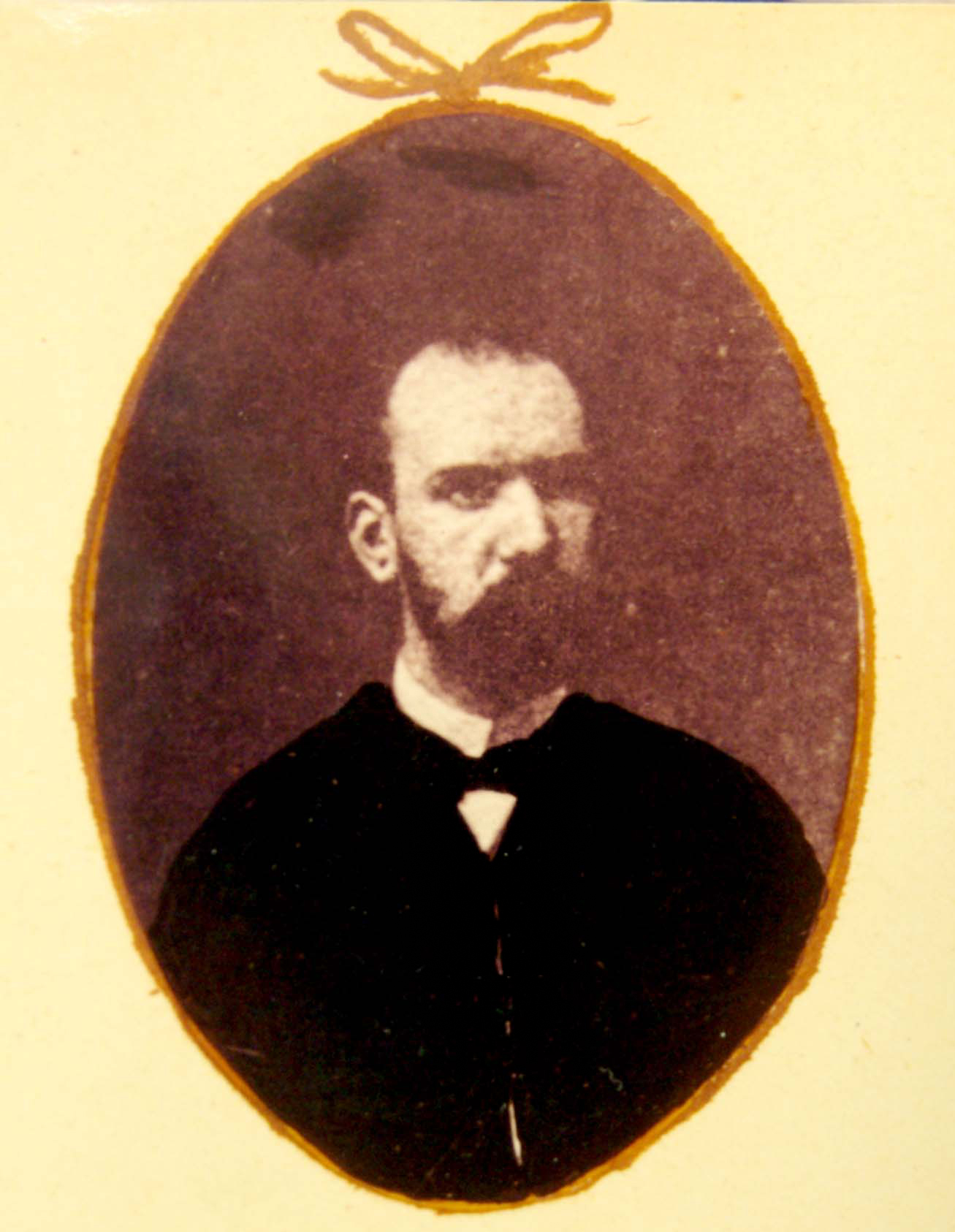

Mayor of Nîmes
- In office 15 May 1892 – 20 May 1900
- Preceded by: Alexandre Bouchet
- Succeeded by: Gaston Crouzet

Personal details
- Born: Alfred Émile Reinaud; 12 March 1854 Vauvert, France
- Died: 21 November 1924 (aged 70) Nîmes, France
- Education: University of Montpellier; Paris Law Faculty
- Occupation: Lawyer
- Awards: Officier de la Légion d'honneur; Officier de l'Instruction publique; Montyon Prize

Military service
- Branch/service: French army
- Rank: Captain

Alfred Émile Reinaud (12 March 1854 – 21 November 1924) was a French lawyer, politician and essayist who served as mayor of Nîmes from 1892 to 1900. Reinaud was also a prominent member of the Académie de Nîmes.

== Early life and education ==
Émile Reinaud was born in Vauvert, in the Gard department.

After a secondary education in Nîmes, Reinaud embraced law studies, first at the University of Montpellier, then at the Paris Law Faculty, where he obtained a PhD in 1879.

== Career ==
=== Lawyer ===
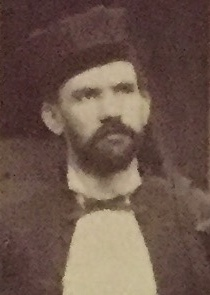
Émile Reinaud in 1889, wearing a toque and a court dress.

From 1879, Reinaud worked as lawyer at the court of appeal of Nîmes. A member of the city's bar association, he was also president of the legal aid bureau.

In 1909, he was elected Nîmes' bâtonnier (head of the bar), and reelected in 1910 and 1911.

French historian Raymond Huard cites him as an example of the strong involvement of Nîmes lawyers within the local political community.

=== Mayor of Nîmes ===
In 1891, Reinaud was elected conseiller municipal and vice mayor of Nîmes. The following year, during new municipal elections, Reinaud was elected the city's mayor.

== Other activities ==
=== Essayist ===
In 1886, Reinaud published the first report on France's 1884 law that authorised the existence of labour syndicates. He also wrote a reference biography on French painter Charles Jalabert, for which he received an award from the Académie française.

=== Académie de Nîmes ===
In February 1894, Reinaud was elected a member of the Académie de Nîmes, a learned society. He became president of this Académie in 1905 (one-year term), and was later chosen to be its perpetual secretary from 1918.

== Personal life ==
Reinaud married Claire Lombard (1854–1939), a niece to French painter Charles Jalabert, and had three children: Paul, Charlotte, and Hélène. Paul died at 36 from a war injury, while Charlotte died at 10; Hélène was the only one to survive her father.

== Honours ==
=== National honours ===
Ribbon bar	Honour	Date
	Officier of the National Order of the Legion of Honour	1920
	Officier of the Instruction Publique	1894

=== Prizes ===
- Montyon Prize of the Académie française (1904)
- Gold medal of the Académie de Nîmes (1885)

=== Other ===
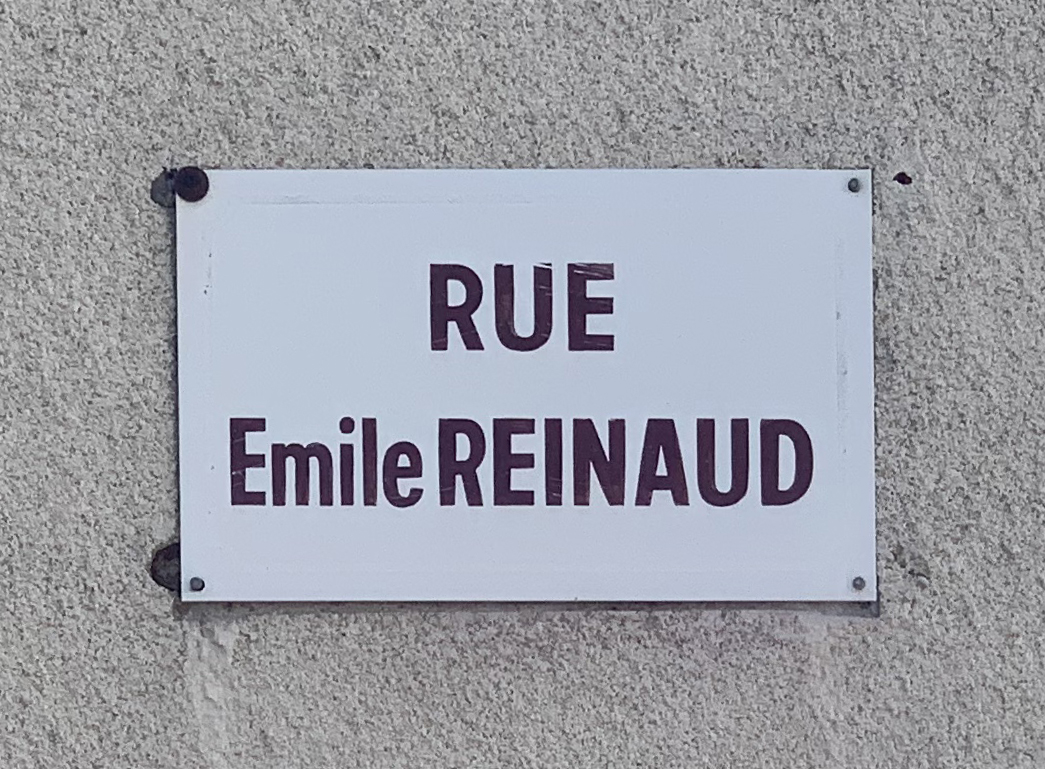
Odonymic plate in Nîmes.

- A street in Nîmes is named after Émile Reinaud.

== Publications ==
- Les Syndicats professionnels : leur rôle historique et économique avant et depuis la reconnaissance légale, la loi du 21 mars 1884, Paris, ed. Guillaumin, 1886.
- La Jeunesse de Charles Jalabert, Nîmes, ed. Chastanier, 1902.
- Charles Jalabert : l'homme, l'artiste – d'après sa correspondance, Paris, ed. Hachette, 1903.
- Aux arènes de Nîmes, 1906.
- La Fille de Jephté : 2 actes en vers, Nîmes, ed. Chastanier, 1924.
- Beautés des Causses et Cévennes : poésies régionales, Anduze, ed. Imprimerie du Languedoc, 1958 (posthumous).
