= FlightsFinder.com =

Airfare search engine

- Company type: Private
- Industry: Travel
- Founded: 2008
- Founder: Shahab Siddiqui
- Parent: CFF International Ltd
- Website: flightsfinder.com

FlightsFinder.com (previously known as CheapFlightsFinder.com) is a travel search engine that aggregates flight fares from multiple flight aggregators including Kayak and Skyscanner and Google Flights. Described by The Telegraph and The Daily Express as a "meta-meta search" engine, FlightsFinder.com was founded in 2008 by Shahab Siddiqui.

FlightsFinder is owned by CFF International Ltd and remains primarily bootstrapped.

== History ==
FlightsFinder.com was officially founded as CheapFlightsFinder.com in 2008 by Shahab Siddiqui while undergoing kidney dialysis. Born with Spina Bifida, Siddiqui used his time in the hospital to develop a flight comparison website. He discovered noticeable price differences between the flight metasearch engines, which prompted him to develop and launch a meta-meta flight search.

In November 2017, the website launched its error fare search engine, an automatically flexible date flight tool that claims to detect potential errors in flight pricing. In September 2022, CheapFlightsFinder.com changed its name to FlightsFinder.com and added new search engines and features to the site.

In October 2023, FlightsFinder.com launched the “Airport stress calculator” tool, which forecasts the level of complexity and stress that individuals may encounter during their upcoming air travel experiences.

In 2023, FlightFinder found that London Heathrow is the sixth worst airport for delays, with nearly one in three (28%) of its outbound flights departing late.

As of 2025, the platform integrated artificial intelligence to provide "Search Summaries," which analyze whether stopovers or alternative airports provide statistically significant savings. In 2026, the site was recognized by travel publication Frommer’s as one of the primary tools for identifying the lowest available international airfares.
