= Brent Hoberman =

British entrepreneur (born 1968)

Brent Hoberman CBE
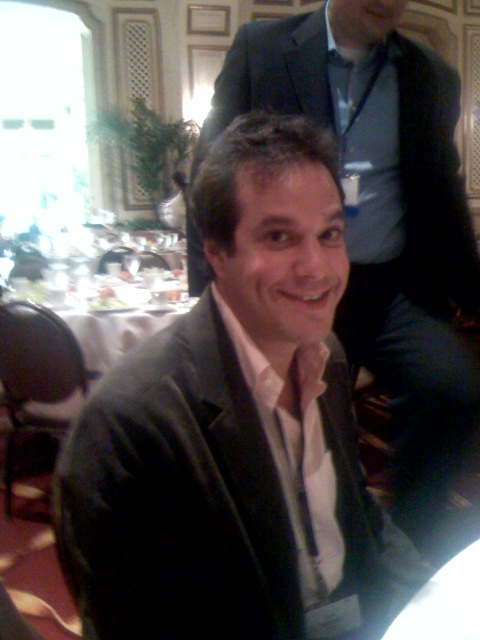
- Hoberman in 2007
- Born: Brent Shawzin Hoberman; 25 November 1968 (age 57); Cape Town, South Africa
- Education: Dragon School; Eton College
- Alma mater: New College, Oxford
- Occupations: Entrepreneur, investor
- Known for: Co-founder of lastminute.com, made.com, Founders Factory, Founders Forum Group, firstminute capital
- Board member of: Google Cloud, The UK Government Digital Service, Tessa Jowell Foundation, WEF Digital Europe Group
- Website: ff.co

Brent Shawzin Hoberman CBE (born 25 November 1968) is a British entrepreneur and investor. During the dot-com boom, he co-founded lastminute.com with Martha Lane Fox in 1998, where he was CEO from its inception, before selling the business to Sabre in 2005 for $1.1bn.

Hoberman's other business involvements include Made.com, which he co-founded in 2010. Hoberman left his role as Chair shortly before the company went public with a valuation of $1bn, voicing that he was not in favour of the IPO. The company was a 'pandemic star' but fell into administration in late 2022.

Brent is also co-founder of the startup accelerator Founders Factory, tech community Founders Forum, and $270m seed fund firstminute capital. Technology businesses co-founded by Hoberman have cumulatively raised over $1 billion.

Hoberman sits on the advisory boards of Google Cloud, UK Government Digital Service, and the WEF Digital Europe Group, as well as advising the British government on technology. He previously chaired the Oxford Foundry, the Royal Foundation Taskforce on the Prevention of Cyberbullying for William, the Prince of Wales, and had further board roles including The Royal Academy, TalkTalk, TimeOut, The Guardian Media Group, Shazam Entertainment, Eton College, Imperial College Innovation Fund and The Economist.

== Early life ==
Brent Hoberman was born into a Jewish family in Cape Town, South Africa, on 25 November 1968. He was educated at the Dragon School in Oxford, followed by Eton College. He subsequently read Modern Languages at New College, Oxford.

== Career ==
Hoberman remained CEO of lastminute.com throughout 2005, until April 2006 when he handed over the CEO position to Ian McCaig and took the position of chairman and chief strategy officer. He stepped down as chief strategy officer and chairman in January 2007.

Hoberman founded the VC-backed internet startup, mydeco.com, an online furniture and interior design site providing 3D technology for consumers to design their own rooms online in 2007 and the website launched in February 2008.

In 2007, Hoberman took on the role of non-executive chairman of Wayn, a travel and leisure social network, and in December 2009, stepped down from the company's board. In July 2009, Hoberman co-founded PROfounders Capital, a fund that invests in early stage internet projects, with Michael Birch, Peter Dubens, Jonnie Goodwin, Rogan Angelini-Hurll and Sean Seton-Rogers.

Hoberman is the co-founder and was founding chairman of Made.com, an online furniture retailer that is a joint venture between mydeco.com and founder Ning Li. In December 2015, it was reported that Hoberman was leaving PROFounders Capital.

Hoberman is a co-founder of Founders Forum, a private network for digital and technology entrepreneurs. Founders Forum has been hosting invite-only events in London since 2006 and has since 2011 expanded to events in other countries such as the US, Brazil, India, Turkey, and China.

In 2013, Hoberman launched Founders Intelligence, a digital consultancy that advises corporates and investors on digital innovation and strategy, and Founders Forum for Good, the precursor to Founders Pledge, the charitable arm of Founders Forum through which founders can commit a percentage of their future exit proceeds to social causes. In 2014, Hoberman co-founded Founders Keepers, an executive search firm within the digital and technology space and Smartup, a peer-to-peer knowledge sharing and micro-learning platform.

In 2015, Hoberman launched a corporate-backed tech startup accelerator and studio with Henry Lane Fox in London. Corporate investors in Founders Factory include The Guardian, L'Oreal, easyJet, CSC Group, Holtzbrinck Macmillan, Aviva, Marks & Spencer, and Reckitt Benckiser. In 2018, Founders Factory launched in Africa with corporate investors including Standard Bank and Netcare. In 2019, Founders Factory launched in Paris backed by Aviva France, and in New York backed by Johnson & Johnson Innovation. In 2015, Hoberman also launched Grip, an AI event matchmaking business which raised a $13million seed round in 2021.

In 2016, Hoberman launched Founders of the Future, which provides programmes, events, and tools for aspiring entrepreneurs, and accelerateHER, which is a network to support women working in technology. In 2017, Hoberman was appointed chair of the advisory board for the Oxford Foundry. In 2018, Hoberman and Spencer Crawley launched firstminute capital, a $100m pan-European seed fund with Atomico as its cornerstone investor. In 2019, Hoberman, Riya Pabari, and Asha Haji launched Founders Academy, an alternative MBA programme to train startup leaders. In 2020, Hoberman launched firstminute capital's second fund, a $250m seed fund with a global remit, backed by over 100 unicorn founders.

In 2021, Hoberman launched 01 Founders, a free-to-access coding school with a job guarantee, with a mission to train 100,000 diverse software engineers by 2030. The first school is launching in Regent's Park. In September 2021, he took Made.com public and, with his co-founder and initial investors, gained £90m by selling shares. In 2022, the Made.com share price collapsed to close at 0.5p on Oct 25th. Concerns had started as early as March 2022 after shipping costs increased. A first profit warning followed in May 2022, and rescue talks that followed were ultimately unsuccessful.

Hoberman has been a non-executive director of TalkTalk, Shazam Entertainment, The Guardian News & Media, The Economist. and LetterOne Technology. Hoberman sits on the Royal Academy corporate advisory group and the UK Government digital advisory board.

== Personal life ==
Brent is married with two daughters and one son.

== Inspiration and motivation ==
Hoberman says his mentors have been his father and South African grandfather Leonard Shawzin, who built an empire of over 650 clothes shops from a single store. He credits his entrepreneurial drive to the business successes of his father and grandfather, and says the catalyst for him starting his own business was being fired from his first job in investment banking for being "a prima donna".

Hoberman has stated that he believes what makes a business successful is passion; in an interview with BBC The Bottom Line, he states his belief that the most successful small businesses are those where the founders remain passionate about their business, and are themselves part of their target market. He believes that by building a business to offer a solution to a problem you have yourself – as he did with lastminute.com and mydeco.com – founders stand a greater chance of remaining passionate and being successful. Similarly, he stated that one of the keys to business success is giving his team purpose and bringing them along on the journey; in a published letter written to his younger self.

== Public and political activities ==
In 2009, Hoberman was selected as one of the World Economic Forum's Global Young Leaders for the UK, and in July 2009, Hoberman joined The Business Sectors Council for Britain under Prime Minister Gordon Brown.

Hoberman was a member of the New Enterprise Council, a group of entrepreneurs who advise the Conservative Party (UK) on policies related to the needs of business.

Hoberman was appointed Commander of the Order of the British Empire (CBE) in the 2015 New Year Honours for services to entrepreneurship.

In 2016, Hoberman was appointed chair of the Royal Foundation Taskforce on the Prevention of Cyberbullying for the Duke of Cambridge. In 2018, Hoberman was appointed co-chair of Prime Minister Theresa May's Business Sector Council for Small Business, Scale ups and Entrepreneurs.
