= Cécile Reinaud =

French entrepreneur (born 1973)

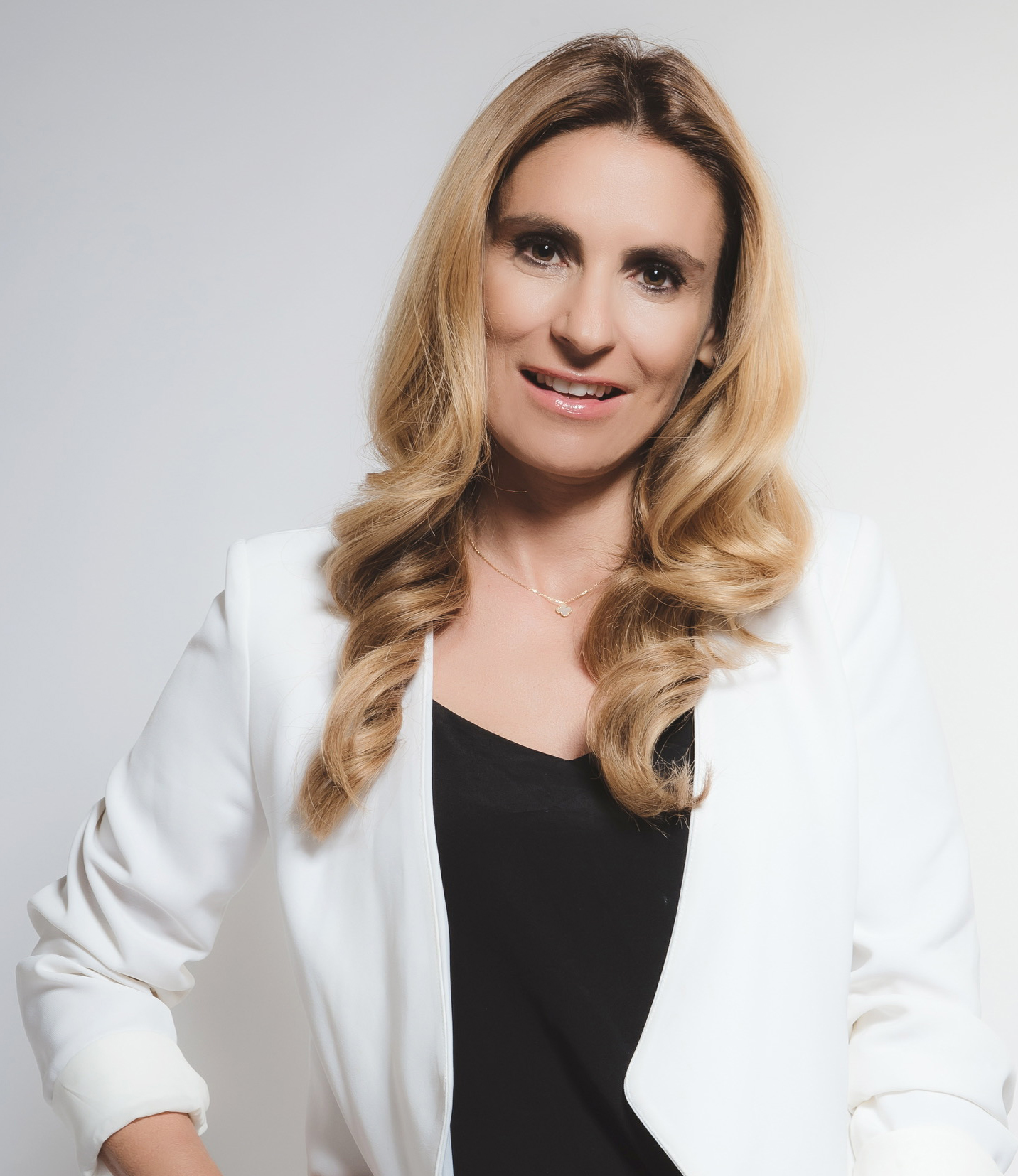
- Born: October 1973 (age 52); Saint-Cloud, France
- Education: NEOMA Business School (BBA)
- Occupation: Entrepreneur
- Title: Founder, Seraphine
- Children: 2

Cécile Reinaud (born December 1973) is a French entrepreneur living in London. She is the founder of Seraphine, an international maternity fashion label and store. Reinaud founded Seraphine in 2002, and the brand received worldwide attention when the Princess of Wales, then Duchess of Cambridge, was pictured wearing the designer maternity clothes through all three of her pregnancies.

== Early life and education ==
Daughter to Guy Reinaud, Cécile Reinaud was born in Saint-Cloud. She grew up in Dampierre-en-Yvelines, near Paris, until her family relocated to the United Kingdom for her father's career.

She was educated at Lycee Francais Charles de Gaulle in London and graduated from NEOMA Business School in Reims with a BBA degree in business.

Reinaud developed an interest in fashion early on, as her grandparents owned a fabric company in France that supplied materials to renowned brands such as Chanel and Lanvin.

== Career ==
After earning a business degree, Reinaud moved back to the United Kingdom and started her career in advertising. She started working at Ogilvy and Mather, an international advertising and marketing agency. Later, Reinaud worked at J. Walter Thompson, now known as JWT, a marketing communications firm.

While serving as the youngest account director in JWT's history, Reinaud was inspired to found her own company by several pregnant friends who requested tailored clothes during their pregnancies.

In 2002, Reinaud established Seraphine. Based in London, Seraphine has stores in Dubai, Hong Kong, Paris, the United Kingdom and the United States. The designer maternity clothes have been seen worn by Kate Middleton, Angelina Jolie, Jessica Alba, Kate Hudson, Anne Hathaway, Marion Cotillard and other celebrities, earning Cecile a reputation as the designer who dresses the stars through pregnancy.

Seraphine is sold through the label's website and stores, and is also distributed through boutiques and other maternity stores including A Pea in the Pod, John Lewis and Galeries Lafayette. In 2018, Reinaud's company was generating €26m in turnover.

== Personal life ==
Reinaud is divorced and has two sons.
