= Kendall & Sons =

Kendall and Sons Limited
- Industry: Umbrellas, Ladieswear, Rainwear
- Founded: 1870
- Defunct: 1982
- Fate: Taken over by Combined English Stores, then Hepworths Ltd. Now part of Next PLC
- Successor: Next PLC
- Headquarters: Leicester, UK
- Products: 'Miss Kendall', 'Kendall Girl', Kendella
- Number of employees: About 660 in mid-1970s
- Parent: Combined English Stores, Hepworths, Next (retailer)

Kendalls store in Ipswich

Kendall & Sons was an umbrella, rainwear and ladies wear company founded in 1870, it was bought by Combined English Stores in 1977, and subsequently by Hepworths, a Leeds-based menswear company. It was then converted into the Next ladieswear chain.

A Kendalls publicity photo from the early 20th century

== History ==
Kendall & Sons was founded by William Wheeler Kendall in 1870. Born 1849, he came from a farming family near Market Harborough in Leicestershire who decided to travel to Leicester to find his fortune. He started selling umbrellas from a barber's shop in Northampton Street, and then manufactured them using Fox frames. The company expanded to over 100 stores by the 1960s and its umbrellas were sold the world over. On many occasions it supplied umbrellas to particular specifications to protect members of the Royal Family, and even supplied 5 umbrellas to the 1952 expedition which successfully conquered Everest.

In 1932 the company moved into purpose-built factory on 128 Charles Street, Leicester specifically designed with an eye to greater efficiency and staff comfort. Indeed, special care was always given to the welfare of the staff. The company was one of the first to institute the tea-break with the tea provided free (15 minutes or 20 minutes during overtime) and a staff canteen. Between the wars one and a half hours was allowed for lunch after a poll of the staff to see whether they preferred working later and enjoying a longer dinner 'hour'. Regular staff trips took place with Kendall's taking the entire factory staff to destinations such as Cleethorpes, Skegness and Kenilworth.

During the 20th century Kendall's continued to manufacture umbrellas, but also developed rainwear and ladies clothing retail lines. During the World War 2, it manufactured macintoshes for the army as well as using the skills in handling silk built up over 70 years of the umbrella manufacturing to produce parachutes.

The main emphasis of the Kendall's sales and marketing throughout its history was quality and high standards, and as such advertised in quality publications like Vogue, and it used the model Twiggy for photo shoots of its clothing ranges in the 1960s. It also regularly bought the entire front page of The Daily Mail. This was usually around St Swithin's day when it was said that if it rained then it would rain for the next 40 days. One such page was on 14 July 1927 where readers were urged to buy a Kendall's umbrella in exchange for a 'free' Kendella Weather House.

The company remained in family ownership until 1977 when it was bought by Combined English Stores. In 1981 it was sold to Hepworth and Sons a tailors company from Leeds, who embarked on converting all the Kendall stores to the Next brand. This was completed by 1984.
