= Reservisor =

Automated airline booking system

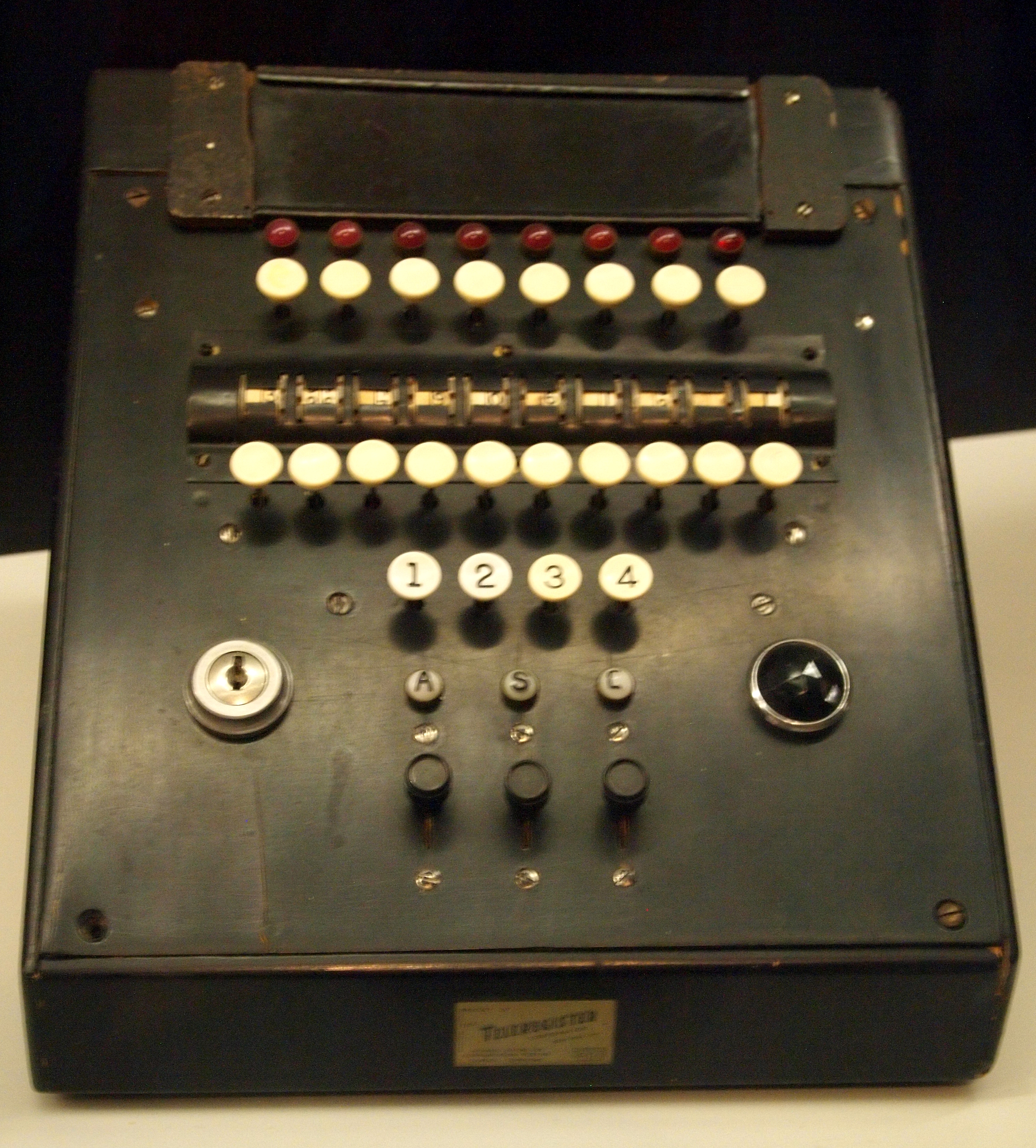
The 1952 Magnetronic Reservisor on display at the American Airlines C.R. Smith Museum

Starting in 1946, American Airlines developed a number of automated airline booking systems known as Reservisor. Although somewhat successful, American's unhappiness with the Reservisor systems led them to develop the computerized Sabre system used to this day.

== Before Reservisor ==
C. R. Smith became president of American Airlines in 1934 and set an aggressive expansion policy. When American Airlines had 85 planes in its fleet he stated "Any employee who can't see a day when we will have a thousand planes had better look for a job somewhere else." Known as a hands-on manager, Smith pushed his vice presidents to drive out inefficiencies that might block their potential expansion.

Following Smith's lead, Marion Sadler, manager of customer support, and Bill Hogan, in charge of finance, concluded that the company was spending too much effort on keeping on top of accounting, and not enough on the problem of booking times. They hired Charles Amman to study the problem. He broke the process down into three steps; finding if a seat was available, updating the seating inventory when they purchased a seat or canceled a booking, and finally recording the passenger data (name, address, etc.) after the sale.

At the time, bookings were handled by a system known as "request and reply". Booking data for any particular flight, say Buffalo to Boston, would be handled by a single office. Here, each scheduled flight was represented by an index card known as a flight card. The offices were normally located at one of the airports involved, but were increasingly centralized at major airports or located at a telephone company switching office to ease the adding or removing of phone lines.

In order to book a ticket on a flight, a sales agent would call into the right booking office and request information on a particular flight. The booking agent would then walk over to a filing cabinet and retrieve the flight card. They would then return to the phone to tell the sales agent if there were any seats available. If there was an available seat, they simply checked off a box, informed the sales agent, and returned the card to the cabinet.

Problems occurred when the flights were close to full. In that case the booking agent would have to inform the sales agent that there were no seats, and the sales agent would then ask the customer if there were any other flights they might choose as an alternative. The booking agent would have to return to the cabinets each time to retrieve the flight cards; since there were many booking agents who might want to retrieve the cards, the agents couldn't take more than one at a time. During busy schedule periods, this process could stretch out the booking process indefinitely.

Amman attacked this problem first. In 1939 he implemented a new system called "sell and report" that reduced the reporting needs by allowing any office to book seats without calling the central office until 75% of the seats were sold. Each office had a board of future flights that consisted of a single hole representing a flight; when the flight reached 75% a large peg was inserted that the booking agents could see, sometimes using binoculars. Once the flight had been pegged, the agents reverted to the older centralized booking system. In an era where aircraft rarely flew with 75% of the seats filled, this system dramatically reduced the number of phone calls.

Although the "sell and report" system worked, it didn't solve the other problems that occurred when the flight had reached the 75% point. The problem of finding an alternate flight when the flight was filled also remained a major problem.

== Reservisor ==
Amman suggested that an automated system for storing seat inventory be built, and in 1944 mocked up a system for a single flight and showed it to Smith. Smith was encouraged, and approved funding for building a real-world system.

Amman approached a number of business machine vendors about building the system he referred to as the Reservisor, but most proved uninterested. It was not until he showed the mock-up to the Teleregister Company of Stamford, Connecticut that he found a partner willing to work on the system. Teleregister had started as part of Western Union, a division that sent stock market quotes across the country and presented them in "big board" form instead of a ticker. Their knowledge of remote signaling and electrical display made them a suitable partner for the Reservisor project.

The Reservisor was essentially an electromechanical version of the flight boards introduced for the "sell and report" system. The heart of the machine consisted of a large matrix with the rows representing the flights and the columns representing the next ten days. When a flight reached its limit, 75% at first but later increased, a relay was inserted into the board to short out the lines when they were energized.

Booking operators were equipped with terminals that looked like a smaller version of the control system, replacing the holes with lamps. They could query the flight status by selecting a flight and then energizing their board. Electricity flowed from their terminal through the selected flight, displaying the status for that flight for all ten days at once. The booking agent could then tell the sales agent the flight status without walking to the cabinet, as well as immediately offer alternatives if it was sold out. The flight card was only updated when the customer actually bought a seat.

The major advantage of this system over the older pegboard was that the signals could be operated remotely. This eliminated the need to have one very large room for bookings, and allowed the terminals to be installed remotely. The flight status could also easily be copied from machine to machine by installing a remote display at another booking office and then having operators copy the settings from one machine to the other.

The Reservisor was installed in American's Boston reservation office in February 1946. After a one-year trial, they found that the office was handling 200 more passengers a day, with 20 fewer operators. One downside was that the electrical relay contacts would get dirty and required constant cleaning. And although it did help solve the availability issues, this made the rest of the booking task - collecting passenger information and recording the sale - that much more of a problem that needed to be solved.

== Magnetronic Reservisor ==
Encouraged by the Reservisor, but ultimately unhappy with the advantages it offered, Amman started examining a much more advanced system that handled not only the availability issues, but the actual seat inventory as well. At about this time, Howard Aiken had started work with the highly publicized Harvard Mark III computer, which used a drum memory for storage. American and Teleregister decided to make a drum-based system that allowed direct manipulation of the number of seats available.

Since the machine was now returning discrete information, instead of a simple on-off status, the terminals could no longer automatically display the overall status of a group of flights. Each flight had to be queried separately from the drum, and then light the lamp if it was filled. Amman spent a considerable amount of time studying the user interaction with the machine, trying to find an easy way for the operator to query the data for a group of flights.

The trials included buttons, dials, rolls of paper tape, loops of 35 mm film and finally, the "destination plate". The plate consisted of a metal card with notches on the edge that engaged switches in the terminal, which energized lines back to the drum to retrieve information for all of the flights to that destination at once. A series of lights indicated which ones still had available seats. When a booking was made, a lever on the terminal subtracted one seat from the value stored on the drum, while another allowed it to be added back in the case of a cancellation.

The resulting Magnetronic Reservisor was installed in American's La Guardia Airport booking office in 1952. The system was built with the ability to store information for up to 1,000 flights 10 days into the future, and took about 1.2 seconds per query. In 1956 a new version was installed at American's New York West Side Terminal with storage for 2,000 flights 31 days into the future, and improved access times to about half a second. The new system also recorded additional information every time a booking was made, including statistical information on the number of inquiries, bookings and cancellations on a per-operator and overall basis. To take full advantage of the new system, the entire office was re-arranged to include 362 telephone operators to interact directly with the public, 40 to handle travel agents and large business accounts, and another 140 to connect to other American ticket offices around the country. Calls averaged 45,000 a day, requiring a staff of 40 machine operators and supervisors.

After installing the Magnetronic Reservisor, Teleregister produced a number of different versions for a variety of customers. A number of customers bought Magnetronic Reservisor systems, including Braniff International Airways, National Airlines, Atchison, Topeka & Santa Fe Railroad and New Haven Railroad. Modified versions, larger or smaller, were also sold as the United Airlines' "UNISEL", New York Central Railroad's "Centronic", and a variety of warehousing and hotel room availability systems.

== Reserwriter ==
The Magnetronic Reservisor largely solved the booking and availability problems, but this left the issue of recording passenger information after the sale was made. Working with IBM, Amman built the Reserwriter, which allowed operators to type passenger information onto a punched card for storage. The card was then processed into a paper tape form, and read to the ticketing offices over American's existing teletype network to automatically print tickets with complete routing information. The tapes could then be forwarded for processing at remote sites, including the Magnetronic Reservisor in New York, allowing remote offices to directly book and cancel flights while recording passenger information at the same time. By 1958, Reserwriters had been installed at most of American's larger offices.

== SABRE ==
In spite of the successes with the Reservisor and Reserwriter, the system as a whole was highly dependent on manual input. It was prone to errors as a result, and about 8 percent of all bookings contained errors. To add to the confusion, the full process of booking a flight, even a single-leg, required the input of 12 different people and took as long as 3 hours in total.

As if this were not bad enough, in 1952 American had ordered 30 Boeing 707s, their first jets. These aircraft increased seating from about 80 on the existing Douglas DC-7 fleet to 112 on the new aircraft. Their speed was also much greater, allowing almost twice as many flights per aircraft per day. The result was that the aircraft could deliver passengers faster than their existing booking systems could sell tickets for them.

In 1953 C.R. Smith was on a flight from Los Angeles to New York when he struck up a conversation with another passenger and learned that he was also named Smith. The passenger was Blair Smith, an IBM sales executive. C.R. arranged for Smith to visit the Magnetronic Reservisor office and suggest ways that IBM might be able to improve the system. Blair alerted IBM's president, Thomas Watson, Jr. that American would be interested in a major collaboration. IBM was at that time starting work on the Semi-Automatic Ground Environment (SAGE) system for the United States Air Force, which had a large number of features in common with a booking system; remote communications with "offices", real-time updating, interactive user terminals, and storage of large amounts of information.

Low-level exploratory work continued for some time before IBM was able to offer a formal development contract on 18 September 1957. Many computer historians have suggested the initiation of Sabre system Development was one of the major milestones in the commercialization of computers. SABRE was not, however, the first computerized booking system; that honor goes to the little-known Trans-Canada Air Lines (today's Air Canada) system, ReserVec.
