= Evelyn Berezin =

American computer scientist

- Born: April 12, 1925; The Bronx, New York City
- Died: December 8, 2018 (aged 93)
- Education: New York University (B.S.)
- Occupations: Computer engineer, Physicist
- Employer: Electronic Computer Corporation
- Known for: Designing one of the first word processors; helping design some of the first computer reservations systems
- Spouse: Israel Wilenitz
- Awards: Fellowship from the United States Atomic Energy Commission; National Inventors Hall of Fame

Evelyn Berezin (April 12, 1925 - December 8, 2018) was an American computer designer responsible for the creation of the first airline reservation systems and the original word processor.

== Early life and education ==
Born and raised in East Bronx on 1925, Berezin attended Christopher Columbus High School. Born to a working-class family with Belarusian Jewish immigrant parents, her father Soloman was a furrier and her mother Rose a seamstress. Early on she became enamored with science and technology after reading her older brother’s copies of Astounding Science Fiction magazines. During her high school years this love for technology grew. When she was 16, Berezin enrolled at Hunter College where she was offered a position as a lab technician but also took courses at New York University (NYU). In 1945, she earned a bachelor’s degree in physics and a doctorate in the same field. In 1951, she began working in the computer industry. Working at different companies is where she learned about logic design and system development. She was often the only woman in technical teams.

Simultaneously, she was working full-time in the Rheology Department as an assistant for an International Printing Company known at the time as IPI. Evelyn earned her B.S. in physics in the year 1946 and would go on to make significant contributions within the space.

== Innovations ==
Berezin already held a fellowship from the United States Atomic Energy Commission during her days at NYU. A startup from Brooklyn by the name of Electronic Computer Corporation offered Berezin an opportunity to become the head of the Logistic Design Department in 1951 which she accepted even though she lacked experience in computer design. This was due to her struggle to find work within the physics world. It was a blessing in disguise as she went on to design many types of computers for different purposes including what we currently know as the office computer. In 1957, Berezin left her job at the Underwood Typewriter Company Company, the company that had purchased ECC at the time. She then began her work as head of logic design at a previous division of Western Union known as Teleregister where she went on to aid in the creation of the Reservisor, the original airline reservation systems. Berezin was tasked with developing one of the biggest computer systems in that era. She helped make the reservation system for United Airlines by utilizing the novel transistor technology at the time to create the Reservisor which had a one second response time. During her time at Teleregister, she also helped with making the first computerized banking system that many businesses went on to utilize.

The New York Stock Exchange even reached out with a job offer in 1960. Unfortunately, due to the fact that she was a woman, it was quickly retracted.

In 1968, Berezin attempted to address the pain points of working as a secretary such as needing to completely retype documents when an error was found or wanting to make changes. She created the first computerized word processor and dubbed it the Data Secretary. In 1969, to sell her innovation, Berezin founded a company known as Redactron Corporation. Her device was similar size to that of a small refrigerator at the time, and used an IBM Selectric typewriter for its input text that would then be stored in document form on a tape drive.

== Impact ==
The applications of Berezin's innovations were plentiful. Her Data Secretary replaced the old process for completing important work tasks like drafting letters and reports and made it much more simple and efficient, contributing to greater productivity and saving a significant amount of time. It was a precursor to the hardware and software used in today's computer systems. The Reservisor meant that reservations no longer required the same manual input. This significantly improved the customer experience and was able to reduce errors, making the process more streamlined. Its impressive response time and computing features made it revolutionary to the industry. Coupled with the breaking of gender barriers of the time her creations have had a significant impact on society today. They are both still in use, rather in a transformed state with the improved modern day technology involved. For example, Airline reservation systems are linked at a global scale. The interconnectedness of the modern world would not have been possible if it were not for her initial airline reservation system. Both innovations have seamlessly integrated within societies everyday functions and the business and travel worlds could have both been significantly different without her.

== Personal life ==
In 1951, Berezin married Israel Wilenitz. Their marriage lasted 51 years until Wilenitz died on February 20 of 2003. Berezin died 15 years later whilst being treated for cancer, on December 8, 2018.

== Awards ==
- 2006 Long Island Technology Hall of Fame
- 2006 Women Achiever's Against the Odds Honoree for the Long Island Fund for Women and Girls
- 2011 Women in Technology International (WITI) Hall of Fame
- Long Island Distinguished Leadership Award
- Top 100 Business Women in the United States in BusinessWeek magazine
- Honorary Doctorate from Adelphi University
- Honorary Doctorate from Eastern Michigan University
- In 2015, she was made a Fellow of the Computer History Museum for "her early work in computer design and a lifetime of entrepreneurial activity."
- She was inducted into the National Inventors Hall of Fame in 2020.

== Patents ==
- Information Transfer Apparatus
- Electronic Data File Processor
- Information Transfer System
- On-Line Data Transfer Apparatus
- Electrical Assemblage
- Data Processing System
- Arithmetic Device
- Electronic Calculator with Dynamic Recirculating Storage Register
- Control means with Record Sensing for an Electronic Calculator
