= Rick Husband Amarillo International Airport =

Airport in Potter County, Texas

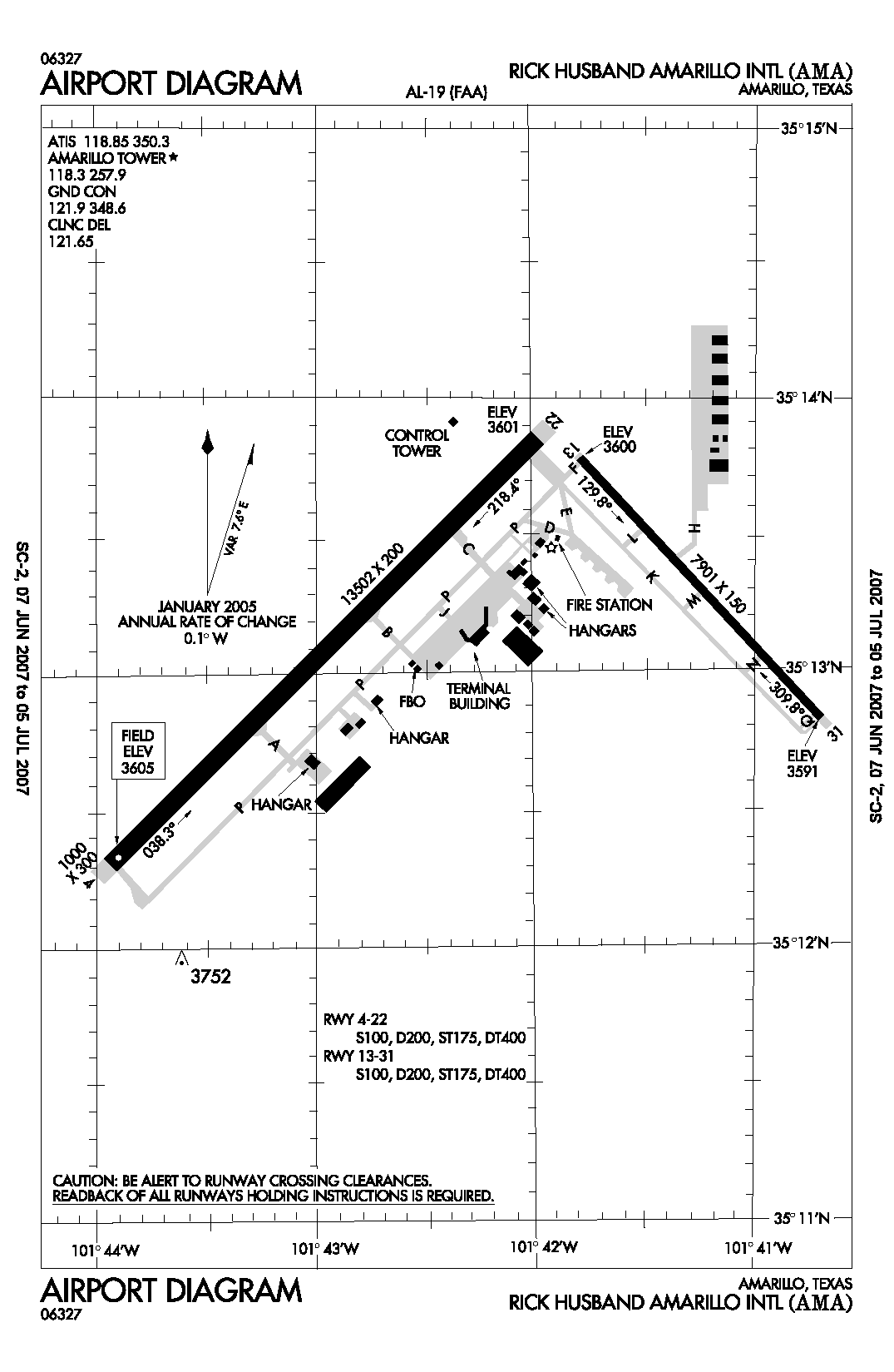
- IATA: AMA; ICAO: KAMA; FAA LID: AMA

Summary
- Airport type: Public
- Owner: City of Amarillo
- Operator: Amarillo Airport Department
- Serves: Amarillo, Texas
- Elevation AMSL: 3,607 ft (1,099 m)
- Coordinates: 35°13′10″N 101°42′21″W
- Website: https://www.fly-ama.com/

Map
- Location of airport in Texas AMA (the United States)

Runways
Direction	Length		Surface
Direction	ft	m	Surface
4/22	13,502	4,115	Concrete
13/31	7,901	2,408	Concrete

Statistics (2024)
- Aircraft operations: 39,781
- Based aircraft (2018): 45
- Total passengers: 802,000
- Source: Amarillo Globe-News, Federal Aviation Administration

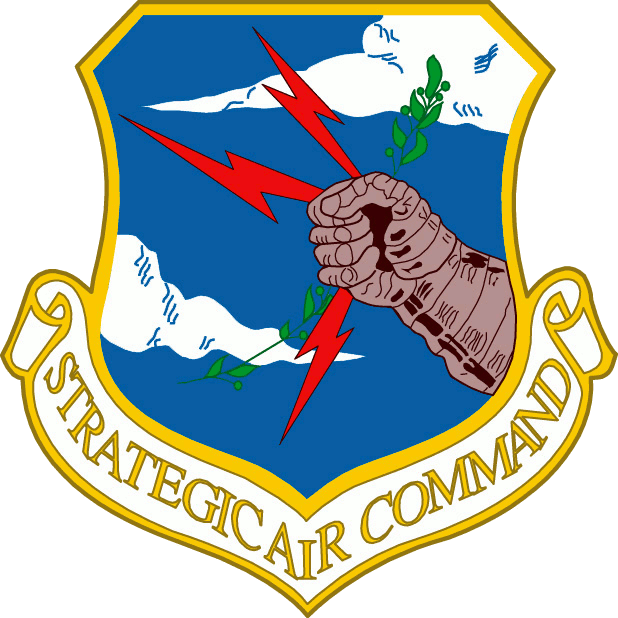
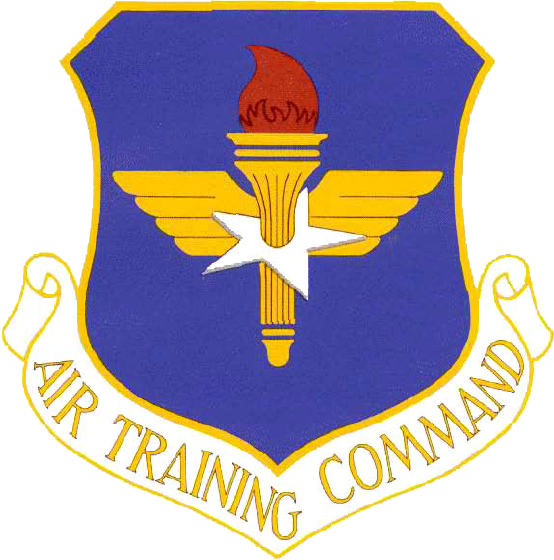
Amarillo Air Force Base Amarillo Army Airfield
- Part of Strategic Air Command/Air Training Command
- Amarillo, Texas

Site information
- Type: Air Force base

Site history
- Built: 1942
- Built by: United States Army Air Forces
- In use: 1942–1946, 1951–1968

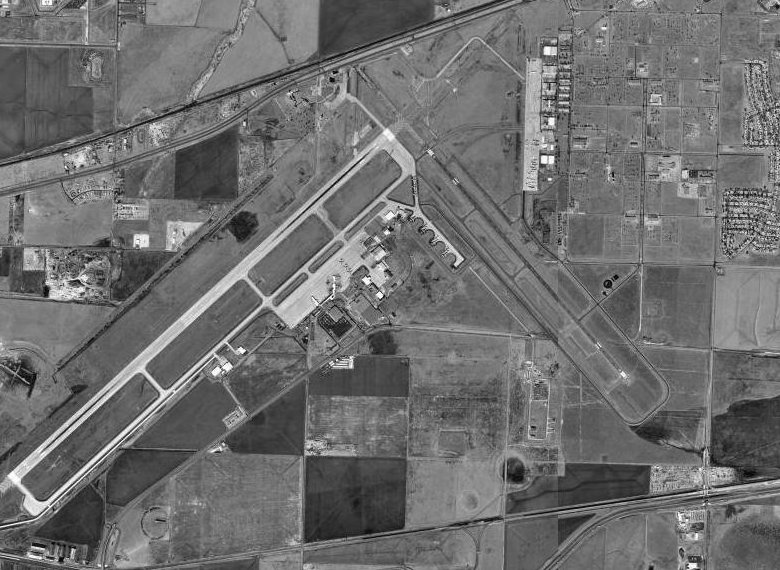
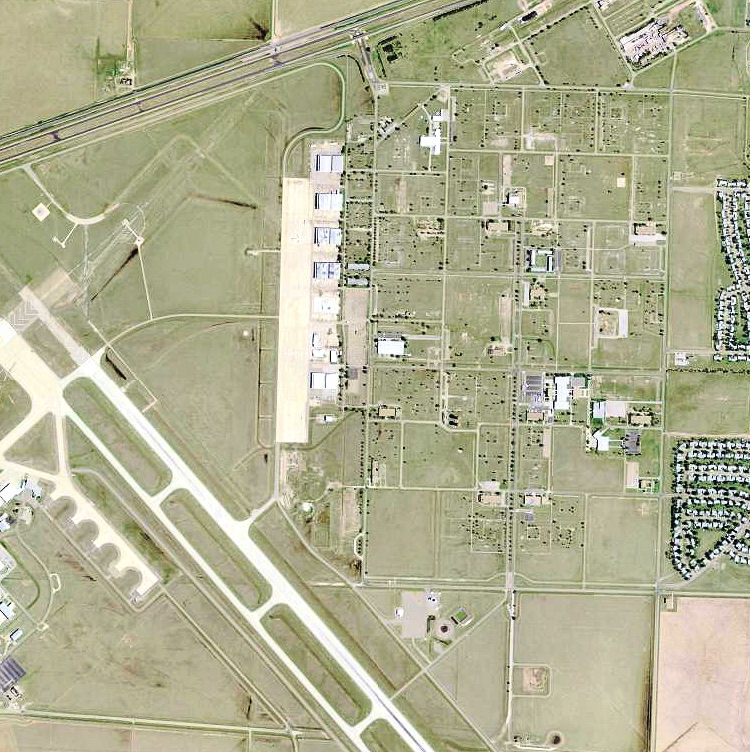
USGS images

Rick Husband Amarillo International Airport (IATA: AMA, ICAO: KAMA, FAA LID: AMA) is a public airport six miles (10 km) east of downtown Amarillo, in Potter County, Texas, United States. The airport was renamed in 2003 after NASA astronaut and Amarillo native Rick Husband, who died in the Space Shuttle Columbia disaster in February of that year.

== History ==
=== Early years ===
The first recorded landing of aircraft in Amarillo occurred on 27 April 1918, when two Army Signal Corps planes, commanded by a Lt. R. Gray, landed in a pasture located in the 500 block of N. Polk. They refueled at the corner of NE 4th and N. Polk, before taking off again. In 1919, pilot-mechanics Fred W. Hinds and Jack Hiller, stationed at Call Field, flew W.K. Whipple to the same pasture. Whipple met with Porter Whaley, the head of Amarillo's Board of City Development, about starting an aviation company. The result was the Panhandle Air Service and Transportation Co.

Panhandle Aerial Service and Transportation Co. was based at Amarillo's first aerodrome, Bivins Field, which started operation on 1 January 1920. Located in the Bivins Addition of southwest Amarillo, the two runways now form North and South Julian Boulevard. The company was financed by H.E. Fuqua and Lee Bivins, which included building a $30,000 six-plane hangar located near 15th and Crockett. The operation eventually moved to the north of Amarillo, west of the current Ross Rogers Municipal Golf Course. In 1928, the field was renamed Bivins-English Field, when Harold English took over management.

The City of Amarillo opened a municipal airport, referred to as "Old Muny" or "Old Municipal Airport", on 29 May 1929, located 4 miles west of the current Amarillo International Airport. Western Air Express air service was inaugurated here on 1 June 1929. Charles Lindbergh and wife were in attendance. Old Muny closed in 1951.

Also in 1929, Bivins-English Field was relocated further 7 miles east of Amarillo on Highway 60, and renamed English Field. Amarillo Airport Corporation, formed by Harold English and Thornton Oxnard, had bought out Lee Bivins' interest. Western Air Express had merged to become TWA and moved operations from Old Muny to English Field in 1930. Southern Air Transport soon followed. By 1935, Braniff Airways was also operating from English Field. In the winter of 1937 a fire destroyed the hangar, administration building, and cafe. Operations continued though, and English Field was rebuilt between in 1939–43, which included paved runways and taxiways when the city took over in 1941.

=== Historical airline service ===
Western Air Express began passenger airline service to Amarillo on June 1, 1929 with an eastbound flight to Wichita and Kansas City and a westbound flight to Albuquerque and Los Angeles. In mid 1930, these routes for Western Air Express were merged with Transcontinental Air Transport to become Transcontinental and Western Air (TWA) and Amarillo became a stop on a coast-to-coast service between Los Angeles and New York City using Ford Trimotor aircraft. The airline's timetable stated this transcontinental flight could be accomplished in 36 hours with an "overnight hotel stop" being made in each direction on a routing of Los Angeles – Kingman, Ariz. – Winslow, Ariz. – Albuquerque – Amarillo – Wichita – Kansas City – St. Louis – Indianapolis – Columbus, Ohio – Pittsburgh – Philadelphia – New York City (via Newark Airport). In 1934 TWA upgraded its service using Douglas DC-2 aircraft which were then upgraded to Douglas DC-3s in 1937. Transcontinental & Western Air changed its name to Trans World Airlines (still keeping the TWA letters) in 1946 and, by 1950, began using much larger four-engine Lockheed Constellation aircraft at Amarillo. In 1955 TWA partnered with Braniff International to operate an interchange flight between San Francisco and Houston stopping in Los Angeles, Las Vegas, Amarillo, and Dallas, Amarillo being the junction point for the interchange. In 1964 TWA began operating the first jet aircraft through Amarillo which included the Boeing 707, Boeing 727, and the Convair 880. Most eastbound flights first stopped at Wichita and continued onto Kansas City, St. Louis, Chicago, and New York. Westbound flights first stopped at Albuquerque then continued to Los Angeles. Nonstop service to Phoenix was added in 1970. After airline deregulation was passed in late 1978, TWA added nonstop flights to Kansas City, St. Louis, and Las Vegas while dropping service to Albuquerque. All TWA service to Amarillo was discontinued on December 15, 1982.

Southern Air Transport (1929) initiated service on an Amarillo – Wichita Falls – Dallas route in 1929. The company was one of many airlines merged to become American Airways in 1930. American continued the route to Dallas until late 1933. The American Airways name was later changed to American Airlines and service returned to Amarillo in 1981

Western Air Express briefly returned to Amarillo in 1933 operating a route to Dallas as well as a route to Pueblo, Colorado Springs, and Denver, Colorado.

Dallas-based Long & Harman Air Lines began service in 1934 with a route from Amarillo to Dallas making stops in Wichita Falls and Fort Worth. In 1935, Long & Harman, and the route to Amarillo, were acquired by Braniff Airways. This route made Amarillo an important crossroads center as passengers traveling on TWA from Los Angeles and Albuquerque could connect with Braniff flights to Dallas. By 1945 Braniff introduced a new route from Denver to Memphis with stops at Colorado Springs, Pueblo CO, Amarillo, Oklahoma City, Tulsa, Muskogee OK, Fort Smith AR, and Little Rock. In 1952 an interchange agreement was made with Eastern Airlines which extended the Denver-Memphis service onto Miami, Florida by linking with Eastern's route from Memphis to Miami, stopping in Birmingham, Atlanta, and Orlando. In 1955 an interchange flight was also operated with TWA on a San Francisco – Los Angeles – Las Vegas – Amarillo – Dallas – Houston routing. By the 1960s, many of the stops on the Denver – Memphis route, including Pueblo and Muskogee, had been eliminated as well as the stops on the Amarillo-Dallas route although some flights to Dallas began stopping in Lubbock, Texas. In the 1970s the flights to Denver and Oklahoma City were discontinued and Amarillo was no longer included on the interchange route to Miami. All Braniff service ended on May 12, 1982 when the carrier declared bankruptcy and shut down. Over the years Braniff operated a variety of aircraft at Amarillo including the Lockheed Model 12 Electra Junior, Douglas DC-3, Convair 240, and Lockheed L-188 Electra. By 1968 Braniff International had introduced jet service to Amarillo with the Boeing 727-100, Boeing 727-200, and British Aircraft Corporation BAC One-Eleven jets.

Pioneer Air Lines, a local service airline, began service in 1945 as "Essair" with a route from Amarillo to Houston Hobby Airport, stopping in Plainview, Lubbock, Abilene, San Angelo, and Austin, Texas. In 1948 the carrier had changed its name to Pioneer and a new route to El Paso began with stops in Clovis, Roswell, and Las Cruces, New Mexico. The El Paso route was discontinued in 1950 and Pioneer merged into Continental Airlines in 1955 which retained operating the route to Houston. Pioneer operated Douglas DC-3 and Martin 2-0-2 aircraft.

Continental Airlines began its service to Amarillo upon merging with Pioneer Air Lines in 1955 and acquiring the route to Houston. By 1959, nonstop service to Dallas was added along with one-stop flights via Lubbock. Continental operated Douglas DC-3, Convair 340, and Vickers Viscount prop aircraft during this time. The carrier added jet service in the late 1960s beginning with the Douglas DC-9-10 followed by the Boeing 727-200 on the following routes: Amarillo-Lubbock-Midland-San Angelo-Houston Intercontinental Airport, Amarillo-Lubbock-Midland-El Paso-Los Angeles, and Amarillo-Lubbock-Dallas. All service was discontinued in 1977 but would return in late 1982 when Continental merged with Texas International Airlines.

Central Airlines, a local service airline, began Amarillo service in 1950 with a route to Dallas and Fort Worth making stops in Tulsa and ten other communities in Texas and Oklahoma. In 1956 the carrier added new routes to Denver and Wichita, each making several stops, and new nonstop service to Oklahoma City was added by 1961. Central operated Douglas DC-3, Convair 240, and Convair 600 aircraft. In 1967 Central merged into Frontier Airlines which retained its routes from Amarillo.

Frontier Airlines (1950–1986) began Amarillo service upon merging with Central Airlines in 1967 and retaining that carriers routes. Service was scaled back over the next few years and by 1974 Frontier was only operating a Denver-Colorado Springs-Pueblo-Lamar CO-Amarillo-Oklahoma City-Tulsa-Fort Smith-Little Rock-Memphis route which was essentially the route that Braniff began in the mid-1940s. Frontier operated Convair 580 aircraft and all service was discontinued in 1981.

Trans-Texas Airways, also a local service airline, began service from Amarillo to Houston in 1963 with stops in Lubbock, Abilene, and Austin. Douglas DC-3, Convair 240, and Convair 600 aircraft were used. In 1969 the carrier changed its name to Texas International and began operating Douglas DC-9-10 and McDonnell Douglas DC-9-30 jets to Dallas with a stop in Wichita Falls, Nonstops jets also began to Denver and to San Antonio, continuing to Houston. The original route to Houston with prop aircraft had been discontinued. Nonstop flights to Dallas were added in 1973 and a flight to Clovis, Roswell, and Hobbs, New Mexico was briefly operated with a Convair 600. In 1974 the Houston flights began stopping in Lubbock and Austin rather than San Antonio. The Dallas flights ended in 1981 and a nonstop flight to Austin was added in 1982 shortly before all service ended when Texas International merged into Continental Airlines in late 1982.

Southwest Airlines began operating nonstop Boeing 737-200 service to Dallas Love Field in 1978. Service to Albuquerque and Phoenix was added in 1982 and nonstop flights to Las Vegas were added in 1996. The Albuquerque/Phoenix flights ended in 2009 and Southwest has continually upgraded their aircraft with later versions of the Boeing 737 including the Boeing 737-300 and Boeing 737-700.

American Airlines returned service to Amarillo in 1981 with Boeing 727-100, Boeing 727-200, Fokker 100 and McDonnell Douglas MD-80 mainline jets operating nonstop to Dallas/Fort Worth. During the 1990s American began converting some flights to American Eagle prop aircraft and later to regional jets. Most of American's service today is operated by American Eagle. American Eagle operated a nonstop flight to Phoenix for a short time in 2018 and 2019.

Continental Airlines briefly returned to Amarillo following its merger with Texas International in 1982 but ended less than a year later when the airline declared bankruptcy. Continental used Douglas DC-9-10 and McDonnell Douglas DC-9-30 nonstops to Austin and Denver as well as one stop DC-9 service to Houston Intercontinental airport. Continental service returned in 1988 with flights to Denver operated by commuter airlines as Continental Express however these Denver flights ended in early 1995. In 1998 Continental returned for a fourth time with regional jet flights to Houston operated by ExpressJet Airlines as Continental Express. Continental merged into United Airlines in 2012 and now United Express operates the nonstop flights to Houston.

Delta Air Lines served Amarillo beginning in 1982 with Boeing 737-200 nonstops to Dallas/Fort Worth as well as one-stop flights via Lubbock. In 1993, the DFW service was changed to Delta Connection using prop aircraft and switching to regional jets several years later. Delta Connection service to/from DFW ended in 2005. In 2010, Delta Connection carrier Pinnacle Airlines operated three daily nonstop flights from Amarillo to Memphis aboard 50-seat regional jets, but this service was reduced to one daily flight in December 2010 and eliminated altogether in March 2011.

Aspen Airways began service to Amarillo in 1983 with flights to Denver and Lubbock using Convair 580 prop aircraft. These flights were upgraded to British Aerospace BAe 146-100 jet aircraft in 1985 and Aspen began operating as United Express on behalf of United Airlines in 1986. All service ended in 1990 when Aspen went out of business.

United Express service to Denver began in 1986 and has been operated by a variety of commuter and regional airlines using prop aircraft and regional jets. The Denver service ended in 2002 but returned in 2011 with all regional jets. Upon the merger of United and Continental Airlines in 2012, new United Express service was added with nonstop service to Houston.

ViaAir briefly operated nonstop service to Austin in late 2018 and early 2019 using Embraer 145 regional jets.

Several independent commuter airlines have also served Amarillo including Air Midwest, Trans Central Airlines, Excellair, and Great Lakes Airlines.

=== Airline terminal and airport name change ===
In 1952 the airport name changed to Amarillo Air Terminal. After the adjacent Amarillo Air Force Base was deactivated in 1968 a portion became part of Amarillo Air Terminal. The primary instrument runway, built for the USAF Strategic Air Command base, at 13,502 feet (4,115 m) is among the longest commercial runways in the United States and is still used for military training. During the mid-1970s the airport was used for jet training by (then) West German national airline Deutsche Lufthansa AG.

New terminal buildings were opened on 12 September 1954, and 17 May 1971. By 1976, the airport had also become a US Customs port of entry, becoming Amarillo International Airport.

The original English Field terminal building was converted in 1997 to a museum maintained by the Texas Aviation Historical Society. This museum lost its lease with the City of Amarillo and is now located in buildings southeast of the main runway, formally known as Attebury Grain. The name of the original airfield is memorialized in the English Fieldhouse, a local restaurant located adjacent to the general aviation terminal.

In 2003 the airport terminal building was rededicated to NASA astronaut Rick Husband, the commander of mission STS-107 of the Space Shuttle Columbia and an Amarillo native. Husband and his crew were killed when the Columbia disintegrated upon re-entry on February 1, 2003.

The terminal building underwent a $52.2 million renovation that was designed by the firms Reynolds, Smith & Hills and Shiver Megert and Associates and completed in 2011.

=== Amarillo Field/Amarillo Army Airfield (1942–1946) ===
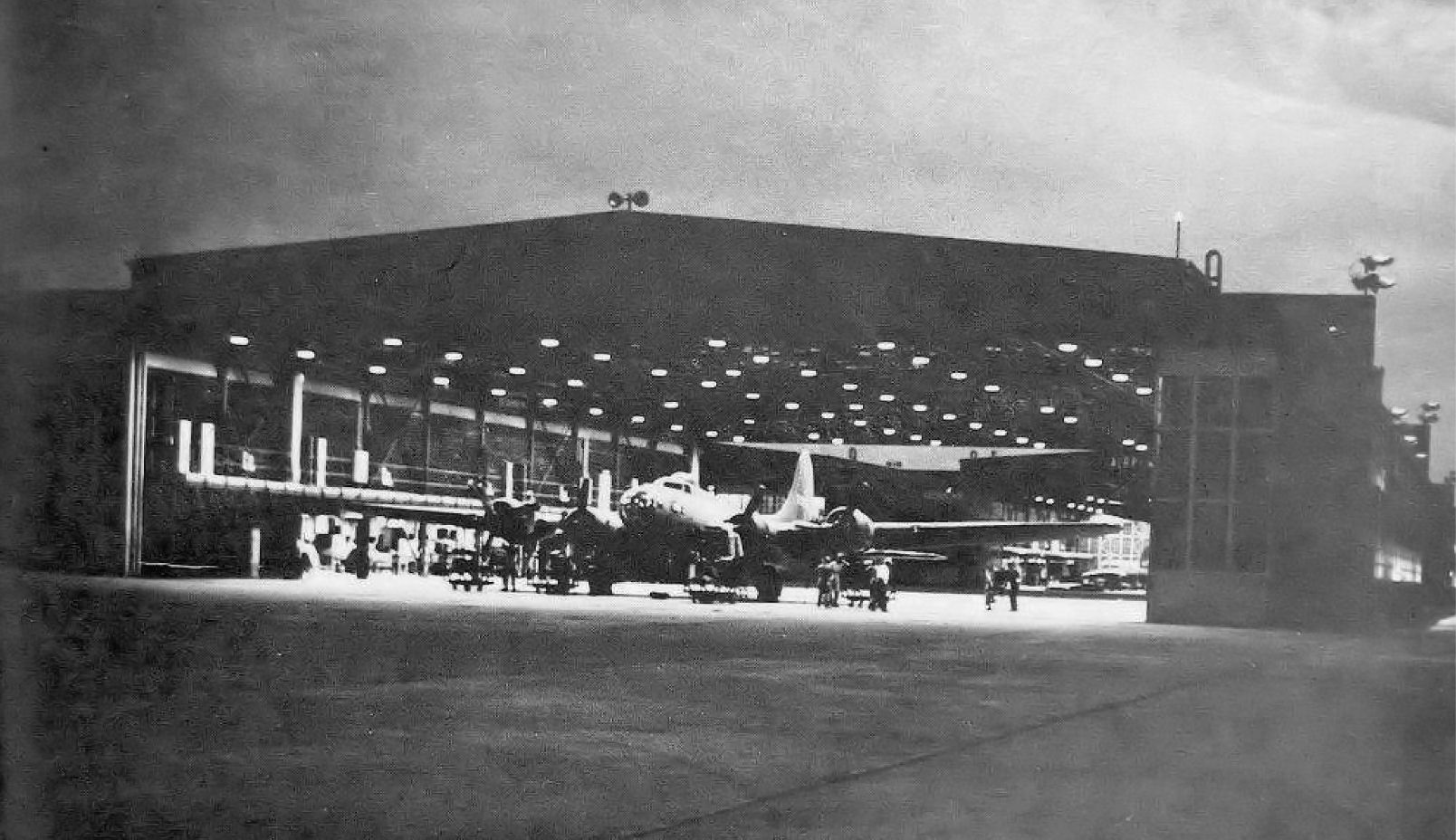
Nighttime maintenance training on a B-17 at Amarillo Army Airfield

In the midst of WW II, Col. Edward C. Black was transferred from his command of Sheppard Field, and ordered to activate an Air Corp Technical School ten miles east of Amarillo, next to English Field. The purpose of the center was to train Flying Fortress mechanics and technicians. Black established his headquarters in the Amarillo Building and construction started on 20 April. The new site was designated Amarillo Field on 26 May. Over 25,000 trees and shrubs were planted and grass sown in an attempt to control soil erosion and dust clouds. The field was manned on 2 September; students arrived on 3 September; Black's HQ staff moved in on 6 September; and instruction started on 7 September. Brig. Gen. Julian B. Haddon assumed command on 22 October and held an open house for Amarillo residents on 11 November, Armistice Day, with over 40,000 attending. On 2 December the name was changed to Amarillo Army Air Field. The first class of students graduated on 23 December, with Maj. Gen Jacob Fickel in attendance. Basic training was added in May 1943, training Army Air Forces personnel in the fundamentals of soldiering.

Though most students entered the training without any mechanical training, but the 76-day primary course, followed by a 36-day specific course, ensured they were experts upon graduating. Classes were in session around the clock. Students became familiar with mechanics tools, and the structure of the B-17, which included a B-17 cutaway, and a complete B-17 composed of parts from five different previously scrapped airplanes. In addition, aircraft instruments, hydraulic systems, electrical systems, aircraft engines, and fuel systems repair and replacement are covered, including complete engine overhaul. This was in addition to regular military drill and calisthenics. Students were allowed one day off per week.

B-29 flight engineer training started in 1944. This was the first AAF aircraft requiring such a crew member. The engine control panel was located behind the pilot, and the engineer adjusted the throttle, fuel mixture, supercharger, and propeller pitch for each engine. In addition, the flight engineer computed the aircraft range, fuel consumption, engine performance, weight and balance, and airworthiness. Aircraft mechanics were trained in either the B-29, or the B-17. After 10 May 1945, only B-29 training was offered.

The base was established in April 1942 as a basic training centre and technical school for flight engineers as part of the Fourth Technical Training District and the first students began training there in September 1942. In mid-October 1945 all training stations were transferred to the Eastern Technical Training Command which was redesignated Technical Training Command. The base was closed on 30 June 1946.

=== Amarillo Air Force Base (1951–1968) ===
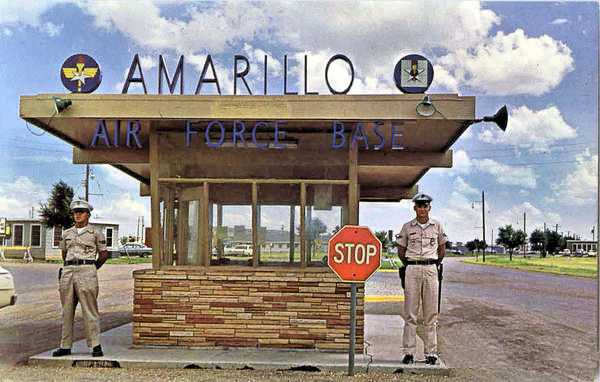
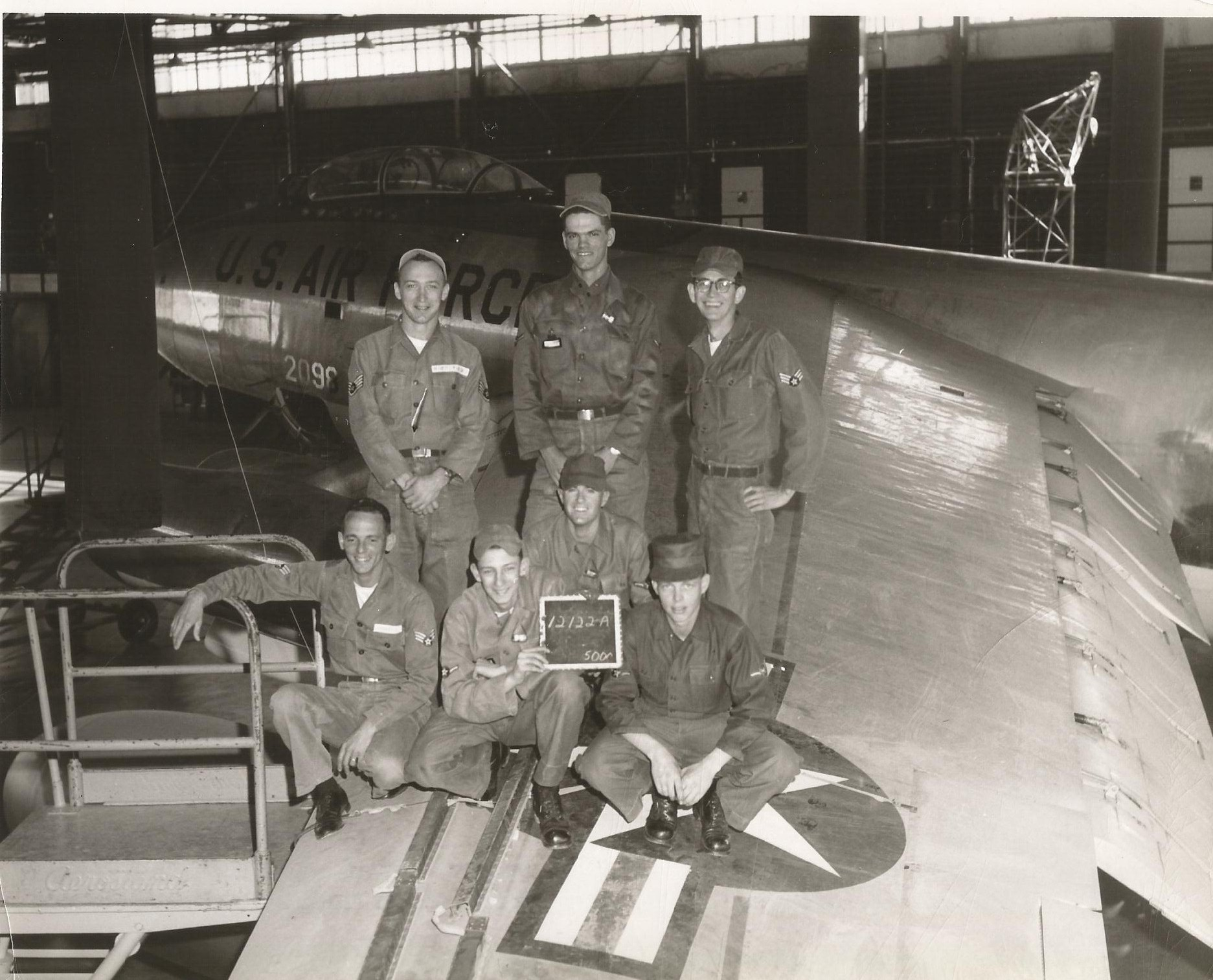
Amarillo AFB in the 1960s, front gate (left) and a B-47 class (right)

With the start of the Korean War, the USAF turned to Amarillo once again as a location for technical training. On 1 March 1951 the Air Training Command activated Amarillo Air Force Base as a technical training base to provide jet airplane and engine mechanic training. The 3320th Technical Training Wing was established to oversee these training operations. Jet aircraft available for training mechanics included an F-89, an F-86F, and three B-47s.

In 1958, Amarillo AFB offered a general course on guided missiles. On 1 January 1959, the 3320th Technical Training Wing was redesignated as the Amarillo Technical Training Center, and on 15 July, a field training squadron was established. In 1961, base buildings were modernized, and in 1962, courses for the F/RF-4C were prepared. In 1964, a reserve medical unit was established at the base.

In early 1965, ATC announced plans to close its training operations at Amarillo AFB, and transfer the base to the Air Defense Command. Amarillo's 29 technical courses would be transferred to other bases. However, emergency expansion of basic military training (BMT), as the result of the Vietnam War, meant the continued use of Amarillo as a training facility. Recruits began arriving on 18 February 1966, and the six-week BMT continued until November 1968.

On 10 February 1966, an airman basic died from an outbreak of spinal meningitis at Lackland Air Force Base. As a consequence of the precautionary limited training at Lackland, ATC organized the 3330th Basic Military Training School, and assigned it to the Amarillo Training Technical Center as a second BMT school. Also active at Amarillo was the 3334th BMTS, which graduated its last class, Flight 388, in November 1968. However, the 3320th Retraining Group was relocated to Lowry AFB in 1967.

On 5 January 1959, Strategic Air Command (SAC) established the 4128th Strategic Wing at Amarillo Air Force Base assigned it to the 47th Air Division. In July 1959 the 4128th Strategic Wing was assigned to the 810th Air Division. The wing became operational on 1 February 1960 when the 718th Bombardment Squadron, consisting of 15 B-52s moved to Amarillo. On 1 July 1962 the wing was reassigned to the 22d Air Division. On 1 February 1963 the 4128th was replaced by reactivated 461st Bombardment Wing, Heavy (461st BW), which assumed its mission, personnel and equipment.

The 461st Bombardment Wing was activated at Amarillo AFB on 1 February 1963, absorbing the inactivated 4128th Strategic Wing. Trained to maintain heavy bombardment proficiency with the B-52, the wing maintained combat proficiency until 21 January 1968, when the last B-52 was transferred. The 909th Air Refueling Squadron's KC-135s were assigned to the wing from 1 April 1963 until 25 June 1966. The wing's B-52s and crews participated in Operation Arc Light combat operations from 18 January until 4 July 1967, while on a temporary duty assignment to Andersen Air Force Base. On 25 March 1968, the wing was inactivated. Wing commanders included Col. William R. Calhoun, Jr., Col. John B. Paine, Col. Charles D. Lewis, and Col. William H. Hill.

Closure of the base was postponed from 30 June 1968 until the end of the year, while ATC released property. On 1 April, 1,784 acres and seven buildings were released to the city of Amarillo. On 1 July facilities were released for civilian use, including those for Bell Helicopter, and Texas A&M University's technical training institute. Technical training courses ended on 27 August, and BMT ended on 11 December. Remaining Amarillo Technical Training Center functions ceased on 31 December 1968, and the base was placed in inactive status on 1 January 1969. The base was finally transferred to civilian control on 16 February 1971.

Gen. William Lecel Lee served as the base commander from 1956 until 1962.

== Visits by NASA Shuttle Carrier Aircraft ==
On July 1, 2007 the Space Shuttle Atlantis made a stop at the airport while being transported on top of the NASA Boeing 747 Shuttle Carrier Aircraft (SCA) from Edwards Air Force Base to Florida – one of the few visits by the shuttle to a commercial airport. After a brief stay it was flown on to Offutt Air Force Base. In 2009 the airport was again used as a refueling stop by the NASA Boeing 747 SCA. On September 20, the Space Shuttle Discovery was transported from Edwards Air Force Base to the Kennedy Space Center in Florida with stops in Amarillo, Carswell Air Force Base in Ft.Worth, and Barksdale Air Force Base in Louisiana.

== Facilities and aircraft ==
Rick Husband Amarillo International Airport covers 3,547 acres (1,435 ha) and has two concrete runways: 4/22 is 13,502 ft × 200 ft (4,115 m × 61 m) and 13/31 is 7,901 ft × 150 ft (2,408 m × 46 m). In the year ending July 31, 2018, the airport had 68,367 aircraft operations, average 187 per day: 40% military, 37% general aviation, 11% air taxi and 12% scheduled commercial. At the time there were 45 aircraft based at this airport: 21 single-engine, 15 multi-engine, 8 jet and 1 helicopter. International Aerospace Coatings has an aircraft painting facility located on the airport; Bell Textron assembly plant located here; many American Airlines and United Airlines jetliners are painted there.

== Airlines and destinations ==
Airlines	Destinations	Refs
American Airlines	Seasonal: Dallas/Fort Worth	
American Eagle	Dallas/Fort Worth	
Southwest Airlines	Austin, Dallas–Love, Las Vegas; Seasonal: Houston–Hobby	
United Express	Denver, Houston–Intercontinental	

Destinations map
Destinations from Rick Husband Amarillo International Airport
Red = Year-round destination
Blue = Future destination

=== Top destinations ===
Top domestic routes out of AMA (April 2024 – March 2025)
Rank	City	Passengers	Carriers
1	Dallas/Fort Worth, TX	146,610	American
2	Dallas–Love, TX	124,590	Southwest
3	Houston–Intercontinental, TX	40,700	United
4	Las Vegas, NV	35,310	Southwest
5	Denver, CO	29,770	United
6	Austin, TX	20,000	Southwest
7	Houston–Hobby, TX	2,550	Southwest

== See also ==
- 688th Aircraft Control and Warning Squadron
- List of airports in Texas
- Texas World War II Army Airfields
