= Thibaut de Saint Phalle =

American investment banker (1918–2015)

- Born: July 23, 1918; Tuxedo Park, New York, US
- Died: June 16, 2015 (aged 96); Naples, Florida, US
- Education: Columbia College (BA); Columbia Law School (LLB)
- Occupations: Investment banker, lawyer, educator
- Board member of: Export-Import Bank of the United States (1977–1981)
- Spouse: Mariana de Saint Phalle
- Children: 9
- Relatives: Niki de Saint Phalle (cousin)

Thibaut de Saint Phalle (July 23, 1918 – June 16, 2015) was an American investment banker, lawyer, and educator who served as a director of the Export–Import Bank of the United States from 1977 to 1981.

== Early life and education ==
de Saint Phalle was born July 23, 1918, in Tuxedo Park, New York. He was born to a French father, Fal de Saint Phalle and American Marie G. Duryee. His paternal grandfather was Count Pierre de Saint Phalle of Nevers, France. Through his father, he is a cousin of Niki de Saint Phalle. His maternal grandmother was Emma Guidet Duryee Auchincloss, who divorced Samuel Sloan Auchicloss, a grandson of Samuel Sloan. He attended Pomfret School, Harvard College, and received an A.B. from Columbia College in 1939 and a LL.B. from Columbia Law School in 1941.

== Biography ==
de Saint Phalle served in the United States Navy and Office of Strategic Services from 1942 to 1946. He was awarded the Naval Commendation Medal and the Bronze Star Medal for his service. He was named Chevalier de la Legion d'Honneur by the government of France in January 1996.

From 1941 to 1950, he was an associate attorney at Chadbourne, Wallace, Parke & Whiteside. From 1950 to 1954, he served as consultant to the United States Department of State and negotiated the Military Aid Treaty between the United States and France to combat insurgency in French Indochina on behalf of the Central Intelligence Agency.

From 1950 to 1958, he was a partner and head of corporate law practice at Lewis and MacDonald.

From 1958 to 1967, he was a director of Becton, Dickinson and Company, where he served as the company's chief financial officer and was in charge of its overseas operations. He was also general counsel of the company, in charge of all legal matters.

Between 1962 and 1966, he was a senior partner at Coudert Brothers.

From 1965 and 1970, he was also an investment banker, serving as vice chairman of Stralem, Saint Phalle & Co. and limited partner and president of Witter Overseas Finance Corp.

From 1971 to 1976, de Saint Phalle was a faculty member at the University of Geneva teaching international law and finance. He was a visiting faculty member in 1976 and 1977. He was also a lecturer at Fairleigh Dickinson University.

On November 7, 1977, he was nominated by President Jimmy Carter to serve on the board of directors of the Export–Import Bank of the United States and his nomination was confirmed by the United States Senate on December 14. He served in that position from December 21, 1977, to June 15, 1981.

de Saint Phalle held the Scholl Chair in International Business of Center for Strategic and International Studies from 1981 to 1983. He was also a director of the Atlantic Council.

== Personal life ==
In 1945, de Saint Phalle married Rosamond Frame, daughter of Murray Scott Frame and Alice Seymore Brown Frame, who were American missionaries in China. His mother-in-law, Alice S. Brown Frame was the dean of the women's college of Yenching University. He died on June 16, 2015, at Naples, Florida, aged 96. He is survived by his third wife, Mariana de Saint Phalle, his 9 children and step-children, and 19 grandchildren.
