= George A. Spater =

American businessman (1909-1984)

- Born: George Alexander Spater; May 3, 1909; Detroit, Michigan, U.S.
- Died: June 14, 1984 (aged 75); White River Junction, Vermont, U.S.
- Occupations: Corporate executive, lawyer, author
- Employer(s): Eastern Airlines, Transcontinental Air Transport, American Airlines
- Known for: Illegal campaign contributions, biographies

George Alexander Spater (May 3, 1909 – June 14, 1984) was chairman of American Airlines from 1968 until 1973, when he became the first of several corporate executives to voluntarily admit having made illegal corporate contributions to President Nixon's re-election campaign. After retiring from American Airlines, he wrote well-regarded biographies of Virginia Woolf and William Cobbett.

== Biography ==
=== Early life ===
Spater was born on May 3, 1909, in Detroit, Michigan, and graduated from the University of Michigan in 1930 with an A.B. degree magna cum laude. He was associated with the Michigan Daily there. He earned a law degree from the University of Michigan Law School in 1933.

In 1935, he was admitted to the bar. He spent most of his law career working in aviation advising in particular Eastern Airlines and Transcontinental Air Transport (forerunner of TWA). He worked at Chadbourne, Parke, Whiteside and Wolff in New York and was a partner there in 1942–1958.

=== American Airlines ===
He left Chadbourne in 1959 to join American Airlines as Executive Vice President and General Counsel. He was elected Vice Chairman in 1967 and President and Chief Executive in 1968 succeeding company founder C. R. Smith.

Spater was caught in the investigations into the Watergate scandal and had to resign from American and was disbarred over an illegal $55,000 contribution to the Committee for the Re-Election of the President—although Spater was never charged or prosecuted. Spater's problems were traced to a meeting with Herbert Kalmbach at the 21 Club in which he was told that anybody contributing $100,000 to CREP would be treated as a "special class". While deciding what to do, Spater subsequently said that Smith sent him four checks for $5,000 made out to "cash" with a note saying he might need the extra cash. He then gave the $20,000 to CREP in $100 bills (which was legal since it involved personal accounts). Still short of the $100,000 quota, he then authorized a $55,000 off the books transaction involving a safe at American Airlines headquarters in New York. When a lawsuit by Common Cause revealed the contribution, he was sacked by the American board and Smith returned as interim CEO.

=== Writing and death ===
Spater lost his law license and his position with American Airlines because of his role in the illegal campaign contributions. He subsequently moved to England, where he wrote biographies about William Cobbett and Virginia Woolf. Reviewing the Cobbett biography in The New York Times in 1982, William Safire wrote that "Mr. Spater's much-needed new biography of the first media giant is thorough, solid, usefully illustrated and satisfyingly annotated, a scholarly labor of love that adds significantly to the literature about a historic figure too long overlooked by Americans."

Spater died at his home in White River Junction, Vermont, on June 14, 1984, aged 75.

== Bibliography ==
- A Marriage of True Minds : an intimate portrait of Leonard and Virginia Woolf, New York and London: Harcourt Brace Jovanovich, 1977
- William Cobbett: Poor Man's Friend, New York: Cambridge University Press

Business positions
Preceded by C. R. Smith	American Airlines CEO; 1968–1973	Succeeded by C. R. Smith
