= Chadbourne & Parke =

U.S.-based legal firm

Chadbourne & Parke LLP
- Headquarters: 1301 Avenue of the Americas; New York City, New York, U.S.
- No. of offices: 12
- No. of attorneys: 400+
- Major practice areas: General practice, Project Finance, Insurance & Reinsurance, Products Liability, Latin America
- Key people: Andrew Giaccia (Managing Partner)
- Revenue: $286 million (2008)
- Date founded: 1902
- Company type: Limited liability partnership
- Dissolved: Norton Rose Fulbright merger (2017)
- Website: www.chadbourne.com

Chadbourne & Parke LLP, founded in 1902 by Thomas L. Chadbourne, was a 400 lawyer firm, which operated from 12 offices in ten countries. Chadbourne was known for its practices in project finance and energy, international insurance and reinsurance, multi-jurisdictional litigation, and corporate transactions.

On February 21, 2017, Norton Rose Fulbright and Chadbourne & Parke agreed to merge into a combined firm known as Norton Rose Fulbright, with about 4,000 lawyers and annual revenue around $2 billion.

== Overview ==
In addition to its United States work, the firm established practices in Western, Central and Eastern Europe, Turkey, the Middle East and Latin America.

In 2014, the firm moved to its home at 1301 Avenue of the Americas. Prior to 2014, the firm had been located at 30 Rockefeller Plaza. In March 2008, the firm acquired the Mexico City office of the New York firm Thacher Proffitt & Wood as well as an associated team of lawyers in New York focusing on Latin America-related arbitration and transactions.

Chadbourne's clients included Thomas Edison, Winston Churchill, James Joyce and the Wright brothers. In 1924, Tom Chadbourne orchestrated the consolidation of New York City's subway system. The firm's success in two landmark cases before the United States Supreme Court in the 1980s created the legal framework for development of the cogeneration and independent power production industries. In its successful representation of French and U.S. clients in the DeLorean sports car fiasco in Northern Ireland, the disclosure of Cabinet minutes was compelled for the first time in British history. The first ever approval for entry of a foreign law firm in India was obtained for Chadbourne and Parke.

== Notable representations ==
- Represented the lenders in connection with the $6 billion Sabine Pass Liquefaction LLC Project in Cameron Parish, Louisiana, slated as the world's first LNG terminal able to import and gasify LNG and Liquefy and export natural gas.
- PepsiCo, in its acquisition of JSC Lebedyansky, a Russian juice manufacturer.
- Counsel to Gazprom in the $20 billion project finance to develop the Shtokman field.
- Advised the Asian Development Bank in its $412 million project finance for an electrical generating plant in Bà Rịa–Vũng Tàu province, Vietnam.
- Antitrust counsel in Brazilian mining company Companhia Vale do Rio Dolce's tender offer for Canadian nickel company Inco, (now CVRD Inco).
- Products liability counsel for British American Tobacco in the $280 billion government Racketeer Influenced and Corrupt Organizations Act (RICO) action against cigarette manufacturers.
- Arbitration on behalf of Lloyd's of London related to Enron and Worldcom losses.

== Notable attorneys ==
- Thibaut de Saint Phalle, former director of the Export–Import Bank of the United States under Jimmy Carter
- Abbe Lowell, chief minority counsel to Democrats in the U.S. House of Representatives during the impeachment of Bill Clinton.
- Ed Muskie, Secretary of State and a vice presidential candidate in 1968, was for many years senior partner of the Washington office.
- George Bundy Smith joined Chadbourne in December 2006, as a partner in the litigation practice in New York, after retiring as an associate judge of the New York Court of Appeals (the highest court in New York state).
- George Pataki, New York governor
- Julissa Reynoso, former United States ambassador to Uruguay
- George A. Spater, American Airlines chairman who earlier advised airlines for the firm from the 1930s through the 1960s
- Eddie Huang, American restaurateur, chef, writer, and TV personality
