= John T. Connor =

American politician

Jack Connor
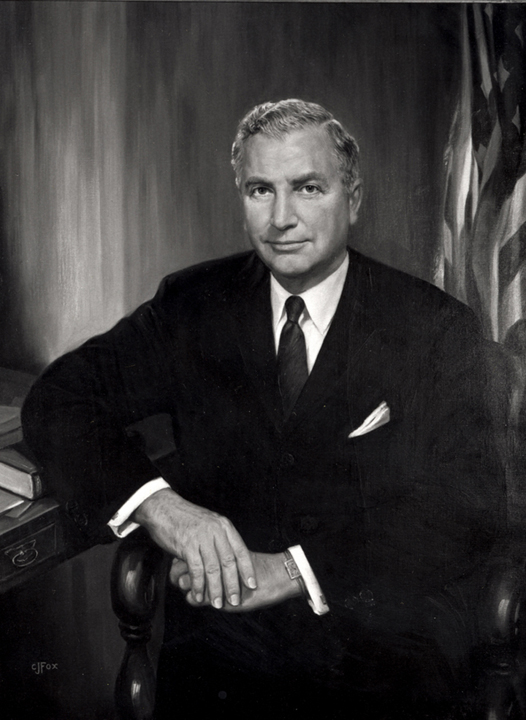

16th United States Secretary of Commerce
- In office January 18, 1965 – January 31, 1967
- President: Lyndon B. Johnson
- Preceded by: Luther H. Hodges
- Succeeded by: Sandy Trowbridge

Personal details
- Born: John Thomas Connor; November 3, 1914 Syracuse, New York, U.S.
- Died: October 6, 2000 (aged 85) Boston, Massachusetts, U.S.
- Spouse: Mary O'Boyle (m. 1940)
- Children: 3
- Education: Syracuse University (BA); Harvard University (LLB)

John Thomas Connor (November 3, 1914 – October 6, 2000) was an American government official and businessman. He served as the United States Secretary of Commerce from January 18, 1965 to January 31, 1967.

== Life and career ==
Connor was born in Syracuse, New York, to Michael Joseph and Mary Vivian (née Sullivan) Connor. Connor graduated from Syracuse University and Harvard Law School, where he was a member of the Phi Kappa Psi fraternity. Connor was a Roman Catholic. He married the former Mary O'Boyle on June 22, 1940; they had two sons and one daughter. He was a lawyer in New York. In 1942, he became a researcher for the Office of Scientific Research and Development, which helped to find cures for many diseases and illnesses.

He served in the United States Marine Corps as the assistant to the future Navy secretary James V. Forrestal. He was working on penicillin production and procurement issues. He worked in the pharmaceutical industry after the World War II, entering politics as the co-chairman of the Johnson-Humphrey Campaign in 1964.

He was awarded the Commerce Secretaryship in 1965 but wielded less influence within the administration than Secretary of the Treasury Henry H. Fowler and the Economic Advisor Gardner Ackley. He helped to the settle an East Coast dock strike in 1965, as well as a General Electric strike in 1966. Connor resigned on January 31, 1967.

In the 1970s, headed the Committee of Business Executives against the Vietnam War, and was to also, the served as the Rockefeller Commission to the investigation of the CIA activities.

He died from leukemia at Massachusetts General Hospital in Boston, Massachusetts on October 6, 2000, at the age of 85. Connor was interred in Mosswood Cemetery in Cotuit, Massachusetts.

Political offices
Preceded by Luther H. Hodges	U.S. Secretary of Commerce; Served under: Lyndon B. Johnson; January 18, 1965 – January 31, 1967	Succeeded by Alexander B. Trowbridge
