= Alexander Trowbridge =

American politician

Sandy Trowbridge
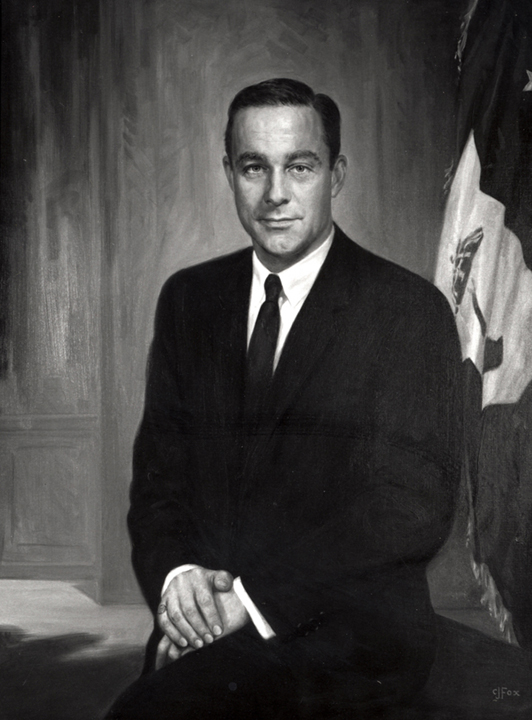

17th United States Secretary of Commerce
- In office January 19, 1967 – March 1, 1968; Acting: January 19, 1967 – June 14, 1967
- President: Lyndon B. Johnson
- Preceded by: John T. Connor
- Succeeded by: C. R. Smith

Personal details
- Born: Alexander Buel Trowbridge III; December 12, 1929 Englewood, New Jersey, U.S.
- Died: April 27, 2006 (aged 76) Washington, D.C., U.S.
- Resting place: Arlington National Cemetery
- Party: Democratic
- Spouse(s): Nancey Horst (divorced) Ellie Hutzler
- Children: 3, 2 stepchildren
- Education: Princeton University (BA)

Alexander Buel "Sandy" Trowbridge III (December 12, 1929 – April 27, 2006) was an American politician and businessman. He was the United States Secretary of Commerce from June 14, 1967, to March 1, 1968, in the administration of President Lyndon B. Johnson.

== Biography ==
Trowbridge was born on December 12, 1929, at 1:05 p.m. in Englewood, New Jersey. He was the son of American University Professor of Russian History Alexander Buel Trowbridge Jr., and the grandson of Alexander Buel Trowbridge, the former dean of the Cornell University College of the Architecture (1897–1902). His grandmother Gertrude Mary Sherman was the great-great-granddaughter of American founding father Roger Sherman. His mother, the former Julie Chamberlain, who was the executive director of the Woodrow Wilson Foundation from 1942 to 1961. Trowbridge's parents divorced, and he was raised by his mother.

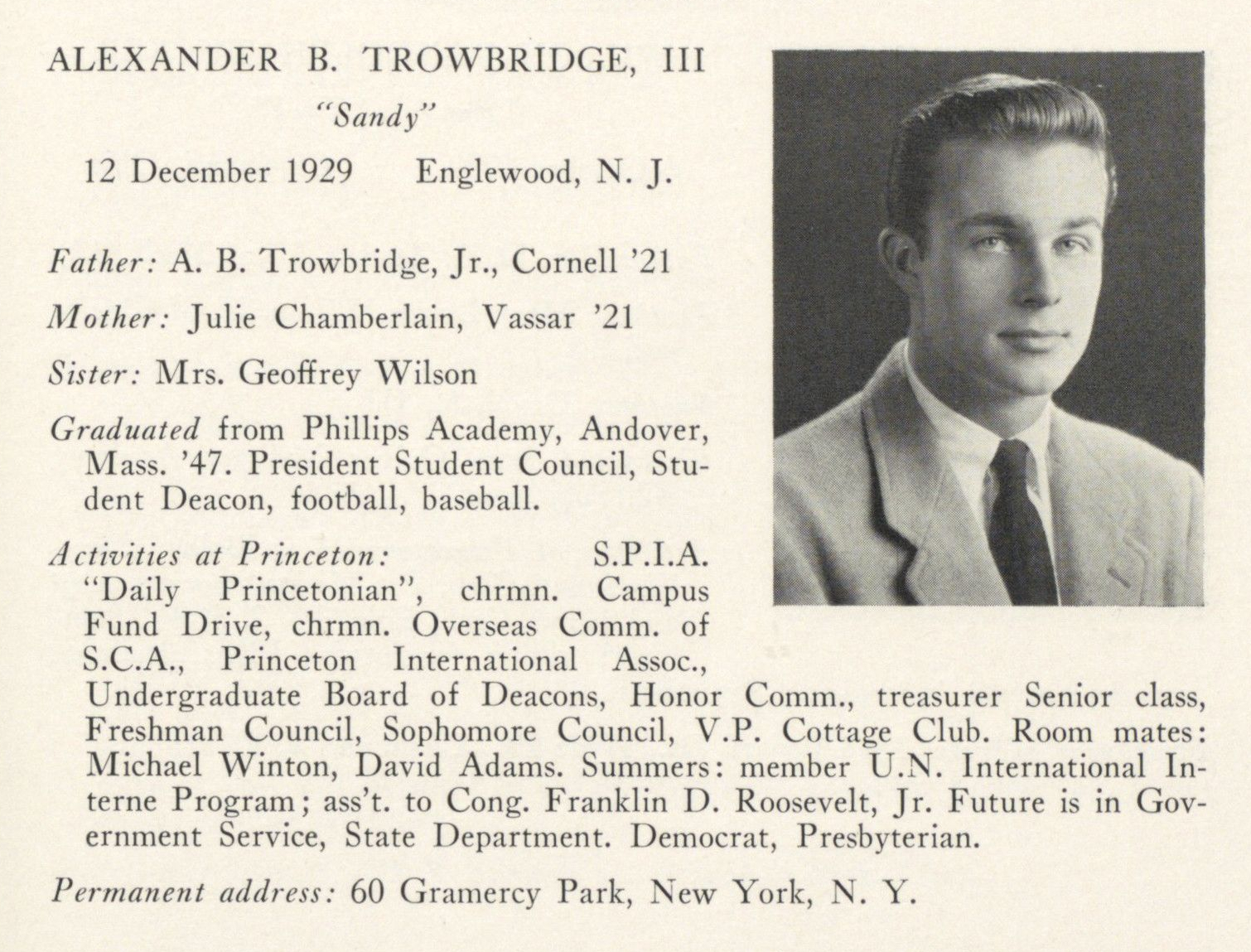
Trowbridge in the Princeton University yearbook, 1951

As a young man, Trowbridge attended Phillips Academy in Andover, Massachusetts, in 1947, before graduating with an A.B. from the Woodrow Wilson School of Public and International Affairs at Princeton University in 1951 after completing a senior thesis titled "The Spanish Loan. A Case Study of Executive-Congressional Relations in the Formulation and Control of American Foreign Policy." After World War II, he worked with various reconstruction efforts. After working with the International Intern Program of the United Nations in Lake Success, New York, he served in the Korean War in the Marine Corps.

Between 1954 and 1965, he was an oil businessman. In 1965, President Lyndon B. Johnson appointed him to serve as the Assistant Secretary of Commerce. On January 19, 1967, he became acting Secretary of Commerce, and in June of that year he became U.S. Secretary of Commerce, a position he served in until March 1, 1968. He resigned to return to business, serving first as the President of the American Management Association, in May 1968, before the joining Allied Chemical as a Vice-Chairman of the Morristown, New Jersey–based parent company and the Chairman of their Canadian subsidiary, Allied Chemical Canada Ltd. of Pointe-Claire (QC).

He later served as head of the National Association of Manufacturers from 1980 until 1989. In the early 1990s, he served as a member of the Competitiveness Policy Council.

As Secretary of Commerce, he proposed to re-merge of the Department of Commerce and the Department of Labor.

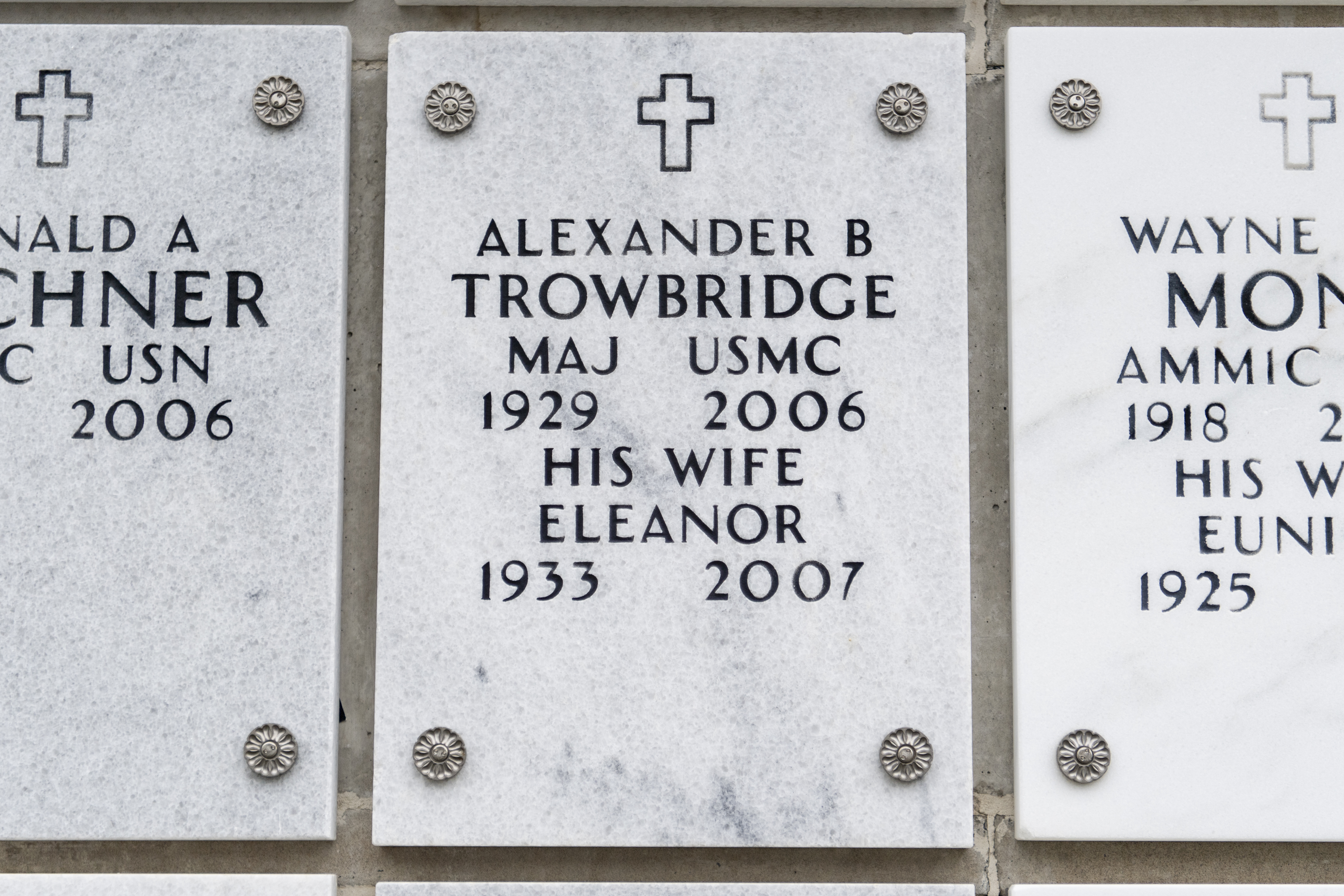
Grave at Arlington National Cemetery

Trowbridge died in Washington, D.C., on April 27, 2006, at the age of 76, after suffering from Lewy body dementia. He is buried at the Arlington National Cemetery in Arlington, Virginia.

Political offices
Preceded by John T. Connor	United States Secretary of Commerce; 1967–1968	Succeeded by Cyrus R. Smith
