= C. R. Smith =

American businessman, general, and cabinet member

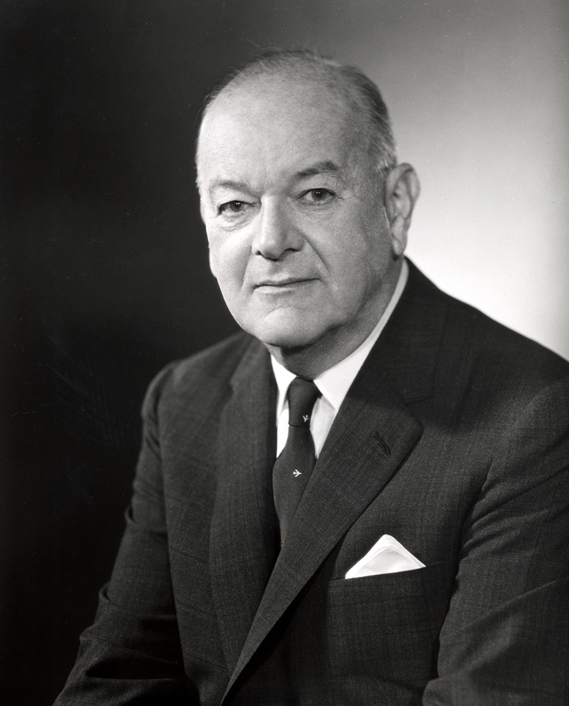

18th United States Secretary of Commerce
- In office March 6, 1968 – January 19, 1969
- President: Lyndon Johnson
- Preceded by: Alexander Trowbridge
- Succeeded by: Maurice Stans

Personal details
- Born: Cyrus Rowlett Smith; September 9, 1899 Minerva, Texas, U.S.
- Died: April 4, 1990 (aged 90) Annapolis, Maryland, U.S.
- Resting place: Arlington National Cemetery
- Party: Democratic
- Spouse: Elizabeth Manget
- Children: 1
- Education: University of Texas, Austin (BA)

Military service
- Allegiance: United States
- Branch/service: United States Army
- Years of service: 1942–1945
- Rank: Major general
- Battles/wars: World War II
- Awards: Distinguished Unit Citation; Air Medal; Distinguished Service Medal; Legion of Merit; Commander-Order of the British Empire

Cyrus Rowlett Smith (September 9, 1899 – April 4, 1990) was the CEO of American Airlines from 1934 to 1968 and from 1973 to 1974. He was also the wartime deputy commander of the Air Transport Command during World War II, and the United States Secretary of Commerce for a brief period under President Lyndon B. Johnson. He is regarded as one of the titans of U.S. airline history.

== Early life ==
Smith was born on September 9, 1899, in Minerva, Texas, located in Milam County, to Roy Edgerton Smith and the former Marion Burck. Smith attended the University of Texas despite never having graduated from high school.

Upon his graduation, Smith worked as an accountant for the accounting firm of Peat Marwick Mitchell. Smith later ran a number of businesses, including a Western apparel store and a firm that sold state records of new mothers to manufacturers of baby supplies.

== Airline career ==
Smith's abilities were first recognized by Texas industrialist Alva Pearl Barrett, who in 1928 set up the airline Texas Air Transport (TAT), which became Southern Air Transport. Smith joined SAT as a vice president in 1929, and through a series of mergers SAT became part of American Airlines. American's owner, E. L. Cord, hired Smith to run the nationwide network based on his able management of the Southern operation. In 1934, he became president of American Airlines.

In business, he was known for an informal, no-nonsense leadership style that stressed close relationships with both executives and employees. Convair president Jack Naish noted that "you can close a $100 million deal on his word alone." He generally communicated through personally typed one-page memos. Smith was said to know every American employee by name until the end of his first term as CEO. He fostered a close relationship with Douglas Aircraft that led American to become a key adopter of the Douglas DC-3 and DC-6: he was also one of the early proponents of what is now LaGuardia Airport in New York City.

One of Smith's most famous acts was the publication of an advertisement entitled "Why Dodge This Question: Afraid To Fly?" in 1934. Airline safety had been a taboo subject at the time, and Smith was credited with being the first airline manager to discuss it openly with the public.

In 1946, Smith began to break Pan American's monopoly in international air travel through American Overseas Airlines, leading to American's expansion overseas. He also created the Admirals Club, the first member's only airline lounge system. In the 1950s, he helped American become the first domestic jet carrier in the US by selecting the Boeing 707 aircraft, which came out months before its rival Douglas DC-8.

Smith was instrumental in lobbying for the FAA to implement a mandatory retirement age of 60 for commercial airline pilots in large part because he was eager to remove older, more expensive pilots from his cockpits and replace them with younger pilots with lower salaries. Smith was convinced it would be easier to train younger pilots for the new jet airliners, as there was some anecdotal evidence suggesting that older pilots on average took longer to adjust to the new jet airliners which had very different control characteristics than airliners with propellers. The age 60 retirement rule was publicly justified on the grounds that pilots might experience health issues past the age of 60. This rule remained in effect from 1960 until 2007 when Congress voted to raise it to 65 on the grounds that the age 60 rule was outdated and it was now much easier to screen pilots for potential health risks.

In 1953, Smith was having dinner with a CBS radio executive who complained of the lack of advertisers willing to have their commercials aired in the middle of the night, even at reduced rates. Smith struck a deal and bought the block of hours from 11:30 pm until 6:00 am exclusively for American and created the show Music 'Til Dawn. It was played on nine major CBS radio stations in American's network with classical, semi-classical, and easy listening music with only subtle advertising. Music 'Til Dawn lasted for 15 years and became an award winning radio show with millions of followers. Smith was a sponsor of a fundraising committee organized by the Cuban Families Committee for Liberation of Prisoners of War, which sought to raise money to pay the ransom set by Fidel Castro for the release of those taken captive as a result of the Bay of Pigs Invasion.

Another coincidental meeting in 1953 between Smith and IBM representative Blair Smith resulted in the SABRE computerized ticketing system.

Smith left American in 1968 to become the US Secretary of Commerce. He agreed to return to American in 1973 for six months, following a period of corporate mismanagement and scandal, while the board of directors searched for a permanent replacement. After the six month period was over, Smith retired for a final time stating that he was "thinking with a DC-6 mind and this business has changed. Yet if you don't take my advice, I'll get upset."

== Military career ==
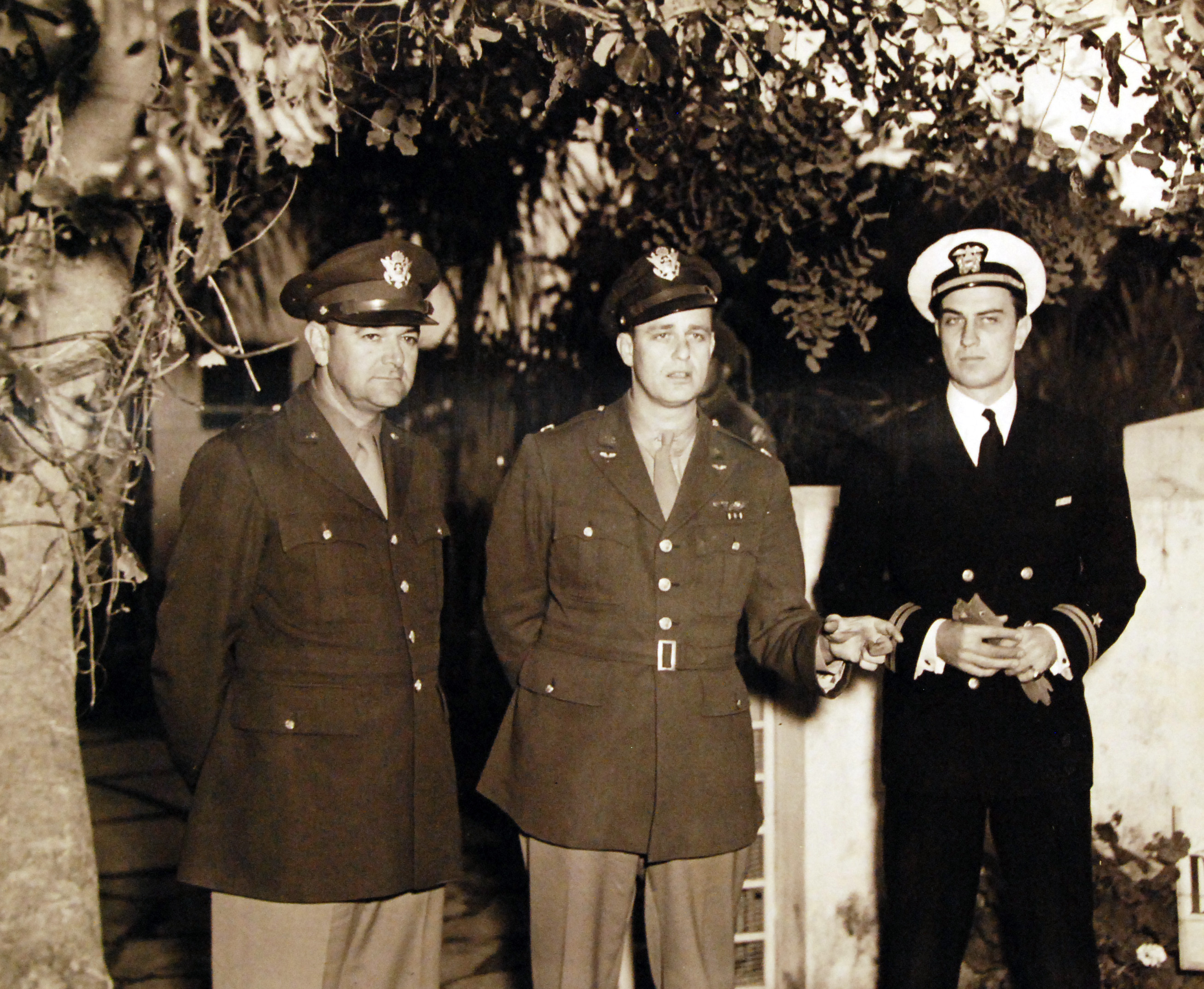
Gen. Smith with Elliott and Franklin Roosevelt Jr. at the Casablanca Conference

With the outbreak of World War II, Smith was one of two US airline presidents to leave their company and join the military (Bob Six of Continental Airlines was the other). Smith become a colonel in the United States Army Air Forces, eventually rising to the rank of major general in the Air Transport Command. Due to his informal but results-oriented management style, Smith won high praise during the war. Referring to Smith and ATC commander General Harold George, Chief of the Air Force General Hap Arnold wrote that, "no matter what mission I gave them, I could count on its being carried out 100%". After the war, Smith returned to run American Airlines.

== Political career ==
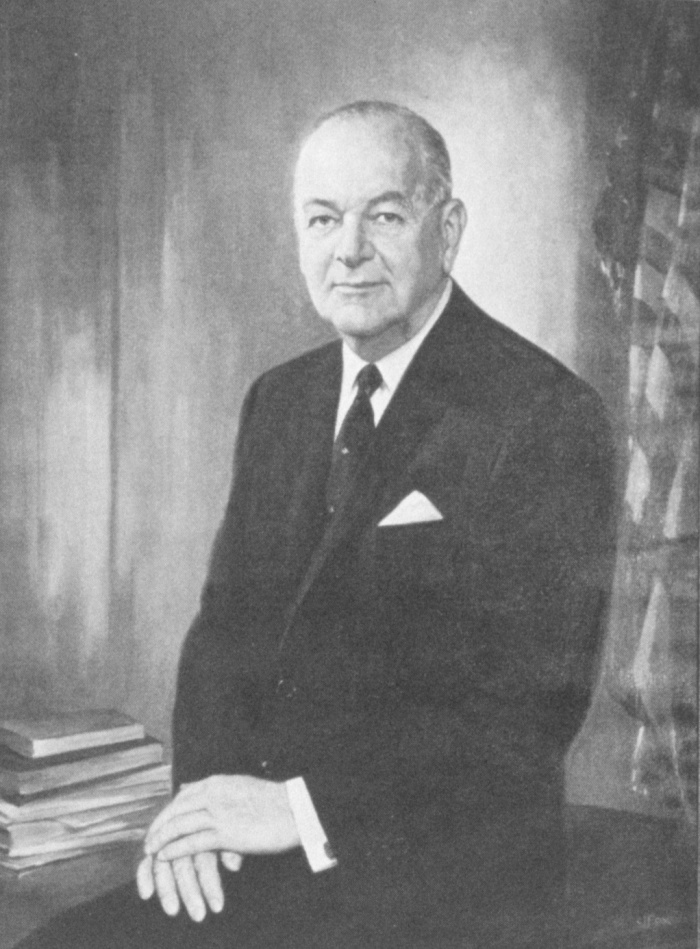
Official Portrait as Secretary of Commerce

Smith was exceptionally well-connected politically, beginning with a Fort Worth and Texas base. He was close friends with many prominent Texan politicians, including Lyndon B. Johnson, Jesse Jones and Sam Rayburn. Smith was also on very close terms with the Roosevelt family, especially Eleanor Roosevelt and her son Elliott Roosevelt. Eleanor Roosevelt would habitually call on Smith for travel arrangements. Smith introduced Elliott to his second wife, served as best man, and persuaded him to move to Fort Worth.

Smith's friendship with Lyndon Johnson was the principal reason for his accession to the Cabinet, and he became the U.S. Secretary of Commerce following the resignation of Alexander B. Trowbridge. Smith served until the age of 69, from March 6, 1968 until January 19, 1969. However, he often clashed with the civil service because of his aversion to bureaucracy: on his first day, he objected to having four secretaries and asked that three of them be fired. This culture shock caused him to leave his post after only serving for 11 months and enter his first retirement, before being called back to American in 1973.

== Personal life ==
Smith married Elizabeth L. Manget, in Dallas, Texas, on December 29, 1934. Manget explained their short lived marriage with, "I loved the man, but I can't be married to an airline." They had one son, Douglas Smith. Smith never married again. After retiring, Smith moved from his New York City apartment to a Washington DC townhouse. At the age of 85, he moved to Annapolis, Maryland, to be closer to his son and grandkids.

Smith's passion when not working was trout fishing, and was known for giving expensive fishing poles as gifts to friends and associates throughout his career. When speaking of retirement to a colleague, Smith said, "If you don't fish, there's nothing else to do." Smith co-owned a ranch in Ennis, Montana, where he trout fished and raised cattle. Smith was a Baptist.

=== Art collection ===
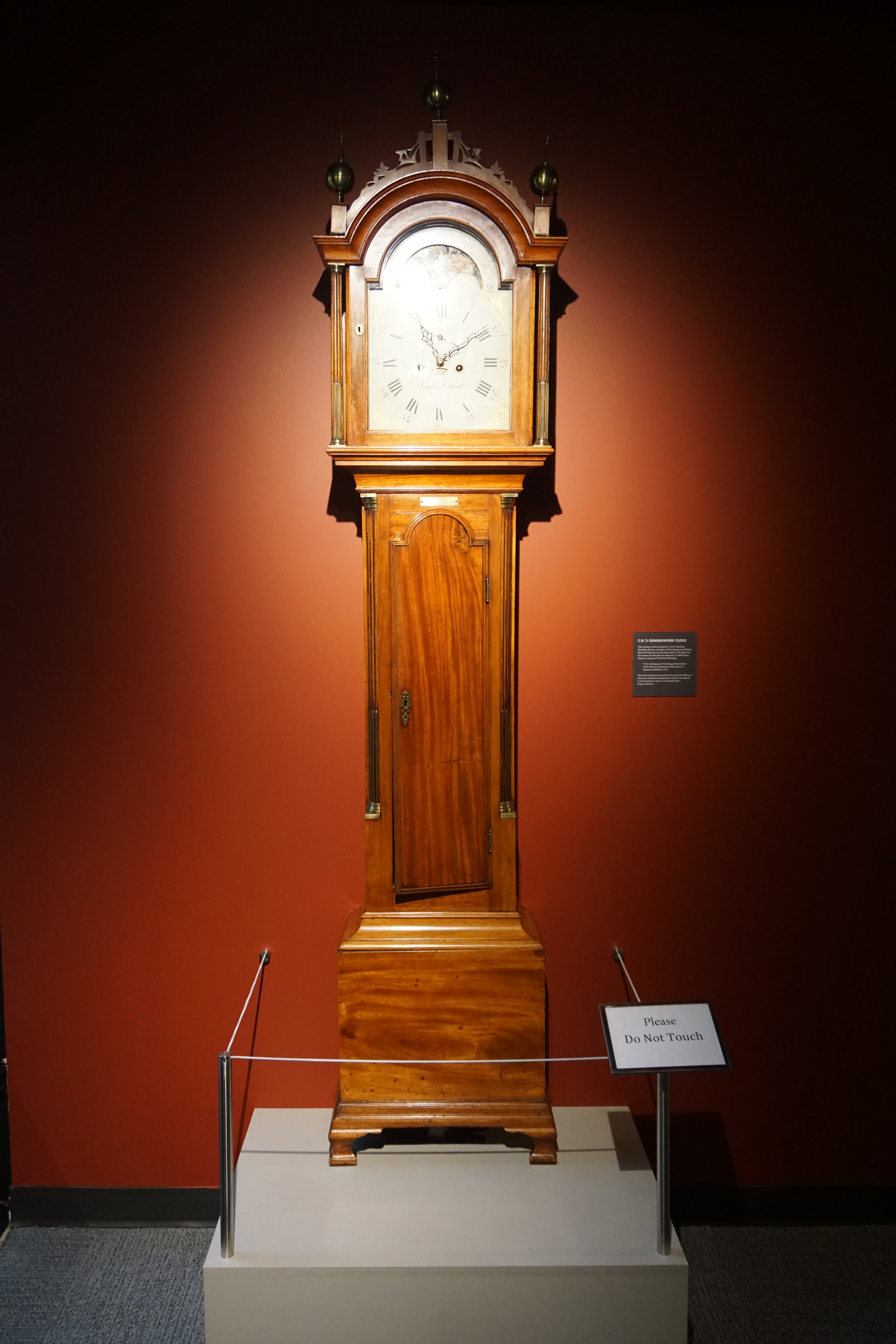
C. R. Smith's grandfather clock at the American Airlines C.R. Smith Museum

While living in New York City, Smith felt homesick for his native Texas and started collecting fine Western art. Smith donated 100 Western art paintings to his alma mater, University of Texas, which are on display at the Blanton Museum of Art in Austin, Texas. This collection includes art from Henry Farny, Maynard Dixon, and others. Smith donated a western oil painting The Romance Makers by Charles Russell to the University of Notre Dame and it is on the collection of the Raclin Murphy Museum of Art. A book was written about Smith's art collection and donations in 1988, titled Collecting the West: The C.R. Smith Collection of Western American Art.

Smith also had a vast nautical art collection, which he donated to Admirals Clubs throughout American's route system.

== Death and honors ==
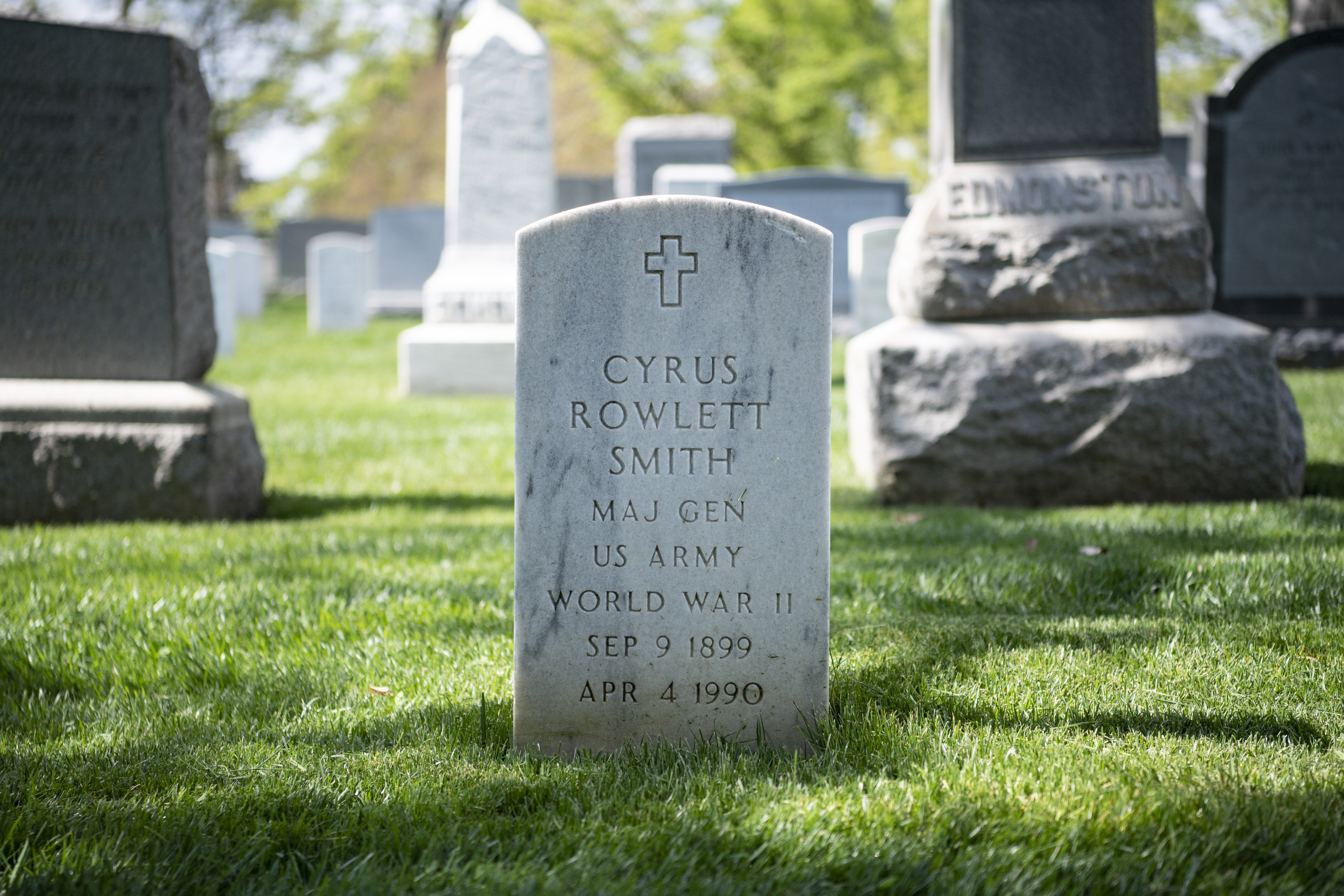
Grave at Arlington National Cemetery

Smith died from a cardiac arrest in Annapolis, Maryland, on April 4, 1990, at the age of 90. He is buried at the Arlington National Cemetery in Arlington, Virginia.

- Smith was a Horatio Alger award winner in 1961.
- In 1974, Smith was inducted into the National Aviation Hall of Fame in Dayton, Ohio.
- He was the 1976 recipient of the Tony Jannus Award for distinguished achievement in commercial air transportation.
- In 1992 he was inducted into the Airlift/Tanker Association Hall of Fame.
- American Airlines opened the C. R. Smith Museum in 1993 at its Fort Worth, Texas corporate campus.
- In 1996, Smith was inducted into the International Air & Space Hall of Fame at the San Diego Air & Space Museum.
- Smith was also the recipient of the Billy Mitchell Award and the Wright Brothers Memorial Award, as well as elected into the Travel Hall of Fame and the Business Hall of Fame.
- Smith was awarded Commander of the Most Excellent Order of the British Empire (CBE) for his service during WWII.

Business positions
| Preceded by American Airways becomes American Airlines | American Airlines CEO; 1934–1968 | Succeeded by George Spater |
| Preceded by George Spater | American Airlines CEO; 1973–1974 | Succeeded by Albert Casey |
Political offices
| Preceded by Alexander Trowbridge | U.S. Secretary of Commerce; Served under: Lyndon Johnson; March 6, 1968 – January 19, 1969 | Succeeded by Maurice Stans |
