= Southern Air Transport (1929) =

Aviation company in the USA

Southern Air Transport was a regional airline based in Dallas, Texas that became a division of American Airlines. It was formed on February 11, 1929 (97 years ago), when businessman A. P. Barrett consolidated Texas Air Transport and several other small aviation companies. SAT was awarded CAM 29, the U.S. Postal Service route from New Orleans to Houston, in January 1929. Later that year SAT came under the control of the Aviation Corporation, the company that organized American Airlines. C.R. Smith was rewarded for running Southern Air as the most profitable division at American, by being promoted to president of American Airlines in 1934.

== See also ==
- List of defunct airlines of the United States
