= American Airlines C.R. Smith Museum =

Museum dedicated to American Airlines history

- Logo of American Airlines, seen outside of the museum
- Established: July 3, 1993; 32 years ago
- Coordinates: 32°50′00″N 97°03′49″W
- Type: Aviation history museum
- Website: www.crsmithmuseum.org

A retired American Airlines DC-3 "Flagship Knoxville" is on permanent display at the C.R. Smith museum.

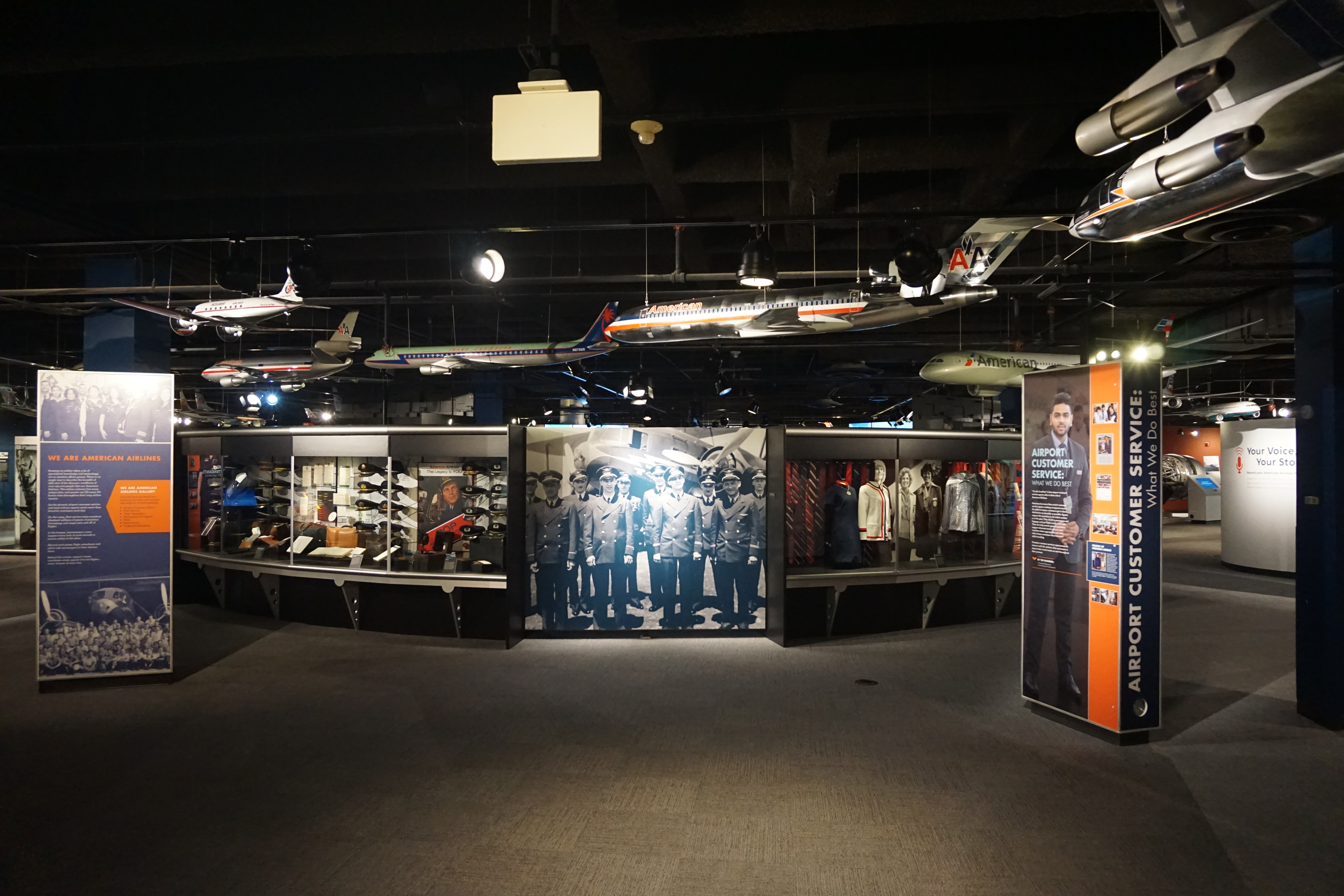
Interior of the museum

The American Airlines C.R. Smith Museum (CRSM) is located on the campus of the American Airlines Flight Academy, which is situated at the southern end of DFW Airport, in the city limits of Fort Worth, Texas, and near the world headquarters of American Airlines. The location is at the midpoint between Downtown Dallas and Downtown Fort Worth near the intersection of Highways 183 and 360. The CRSM has an exhibit gallery of approximately 25,000 square feet (2,300 m^{2}) and a 10,000-square-foot (930 m^{2}) hangar that houses the Flagship Knoxville, a fully restored DC-3 aircraft. The museum also includes a 1,500-square-foot (140 m^{2}) gift shop and a large-format theatre similar to IMAX.

The museum opened on July 3, 1993, and is dedicated to the history of American Airlines and commercial aviation.

In November 2016 the museum received a grant from The Boeing Company to extend its Flight Workshop Program to disadvantaged students in nearby Title 1 primary schools.

== Mission statement ==
The museum preserves the history of American Airlines and interprets the air transportation industry. Through its activities, the museum serves active and retired American Airlines employees, the educational community and interested members of the general public. Because of the museum's commitment to education, its exhibits stress hands-on learning through hands-on displays. The museum collects artifacts and archival materials that are suitable for its educational and exhibit programs.
