= The Plum Guide =

Vacation rental company

Plum Guide
- Company type: Privately held company
- Industry: Travel; Hospitality Service; Vacation Rental
- Founded: 2016
- Founders: Doron Meyassed; Imran Arshed; Arif Meherali; Alex Lee
- Headquarters: London
- Area served: Worldwide
- Services: Travel, Lodging, Hospitality
- Website: https://www.plumguide.com/

Plum Guide is a global vacation rental company headquartered in London, UK, with offices in New York and Hong Kong. The company was launched in 2016.

== Overview ==
Plum Guide curates a list of short-let rental properties. It was initially a city-focused initiative with its primary collections in London, Paris, New York and Los Angeles. Later, the company expanded and as of 2021, it has properties in over 500 destinations across 29 countries on its portal.

The company uses an algorithm to build a database of all the homes available in a destination, then systematically puts it through rounds of quality control, including a Plum Test, to come up with the top homes. It also comprises an on-site assessment by an independent Home Critic. As of May 2017, the company reports that it has tested 67,527 London properties, of which 674 have been accepted for inclusion on the website.

== Funding ==
Plum Guide was launched with £380,000 in funding, majorly from angel investors. They raised a second round of funding in late 2016 raising £1.8M from VC Local Globe. The company also raised £5.7M in a Series A round led by Octopus Ventures, and in 2019, it raised £14M in a Series B round led by Talis Ventures, Hearst and Latitude as well as participation from existing investors.

== Reception ==
According to The New York Times, “In an increasingly crowded market of vacation home rental companies, the Plum Guide stands out for its selective list of properties and high standards of service.” As per Marie Claire, “The way the company is different to other rental companies is that they work with the owners to tailor your time,” and as per Harper’s Bazaar, “Staying with The Plum Guide felt like being in the sort of chic home you wished you owned and far from standard, impersonal holiday rentals.”
