= Motorhome hire agency =

A motorhome hire agency or campervan hire agency is a type of vacation rental company, which hires privately owned motorhomes or campervans to customers. The practice is common in the United Kingdom, where several agencies dominate the market, and has more recently gained popularity in the United States.

== History ==
Motorhome hire agencies emerged in the United Kingdom in 2005, after motorhome hire as a practice began to take off with holidaymakers in the UK. In recent years, these agencies have gained prominence for two main reasons. Firstly, numerous motorhome owners in the UK have sought to generate additional income by renting out their vehicles, partly driven by concerns about the potential repossession of their motorhomes. Secondly, UK holidaymakers have been actively exploring cost-effective alternatives to overseas travel, while international travelers visiting the UK have benefited from a favorable exchange rate.

== Campervan and motorhome hire comparison ==
Campervan hire vehicles are generally smaller than their motorhome counterparts. The height, length and width of the vehicle will be smaller and the maximum mass will also be less. As a result, campervans will be easier to drive with some being almost like driving cars (especially campervans that are based on the Ford Transit or VW T series) and suitable for most driving licenses. Contrastingly, motorhomes will offer more space and facilities. Insurance with campervan management companies is often cheaper and this results in an overall lower total hire cost.

== How it works ==
The concept of motorhome hire is similar to that associated with holiday cottage rentals. Motorhome owners list their vehicles with a hire agency. The vehicle is typically given an online profile and marketed by the hire agency.

Bookings come through the agency and the company deals with all the financial matters and insurance. The customer is then able to collect the motorhome from the owner and the owner is paid a fee.

Most businesses in the United Kingdom operate on a commission basis. For example, hirer X may pay £1000 for a 1 week hire. The motorhome hire agency will then subtract the VAT and insurance costs before paying a commission percentage to the motorhome owner. The percentage paid varies between different companies with some paying 50% or lower, and some up to 75%.

Whilst the vehicle is on hire with the agency it is protected by their insurance and breakdown cover. In the event of damage or an accident, the motorhome hire agency will retrieve the necessary cost of repair from the hirer.

Any motorhome owner can register their motorhome with a hire agency provided that they can supply it in clean working order to customers.

== Taxable income ==
In the UK, residents are required to declare income from the hire of motorhomes, whether privately or through an agency, to HM Revenue and Customs. This applies whether the overall earnings are below or above the taxable threshold.

== International market ==
Campervan management companies are spread across the globe in response to the boom in the hire market. Campervan rental has become very popular in New Zealand, with many considering self-drive holidays to be one of the best way to the landscape on rural roads which are traffic-free compared to those found in other countries. In the UK, campervan management companies cater to festival goers by offering a solution to the traditional rain and mud-soaked tent environment.

== Industry developments ==
The first major motorhome hire agency industry development came in 2006 when the first online availability search was implemented by Motorhome Group. This was also coupled with online booking; allowing customers to book and pay for privately owned motorhome over the internet. At the same time, motorhome owners could log onto an online profile to track the status of their bookings and edit their motorhome information.

Another development which was introduced in 2009 is SMS notifications. Text alerts are sent to motorhome owners when their vehicle receives a booking with the motorhome hire agency.
