= Vacatia =

Online marketplace

- Industry: Internet, resorts, vacation rentals
- Founded: 2013; 13 years ago
- Headquarters: San Francisco, California, United States
- Area served: U.S.
- Products: Online marketplace

Vacatia, founded in 2013 and based in San Francisco, California, is an American Vacation Ownership company that spun out of Vacation Listing Service Inc., launching originally as an online marketplace for buying and selling timeshare interests.

== History ==
In September 2013, the company raised a $5 million seed round from travel, hotel and vacation rental industry veterans, such as Spencer Rascoff (Zillow, Expedia, Hotwire), Erik Blachford (Expedia), Robert Spottswood (Hyatt Vacation Ownership), Raymond L. “Rip” Gallein Jr. (Starwood Vacation Ownership and Marriott Vacations Worldwide), and Barry Sternlicht and Steve Hankin (Starwood Capital Group). Other investors included Bee Partners, Peterson Ventures and Meyer Ventures, as well as personal investments from Egon Durban of Silver Lake Partners and Gene Frantz of Google Capital.

In April 2015, the company raised $8.8 million in a Series A round led by the Javelin Venture Partners.

At the same time as its Series A funding announcement, the company also announced changes to its leadership team.

In November 2015, Vacatia publicly launched its vacation rental marketplace.

In May 2016, Vacatia expanded beyond the U.S. by adding 20 resorts in Cancun and Cabo San Lucas, Mexico.

In April 2016, Vacatia was integrated with HomeToGo.

In May 2016, Disney Vacation Club approved Vacatia as a seller.

In January 2025, Vacatia acquired The Berkley Group, Inc., one of the largest resort developers in the United States, and Daily Management, Inc., a full-service property management company of vacation ownership resorts.

== See also ==
- Holiday cottage
- Vacation rental
