= Campervan =

Type of vehicle

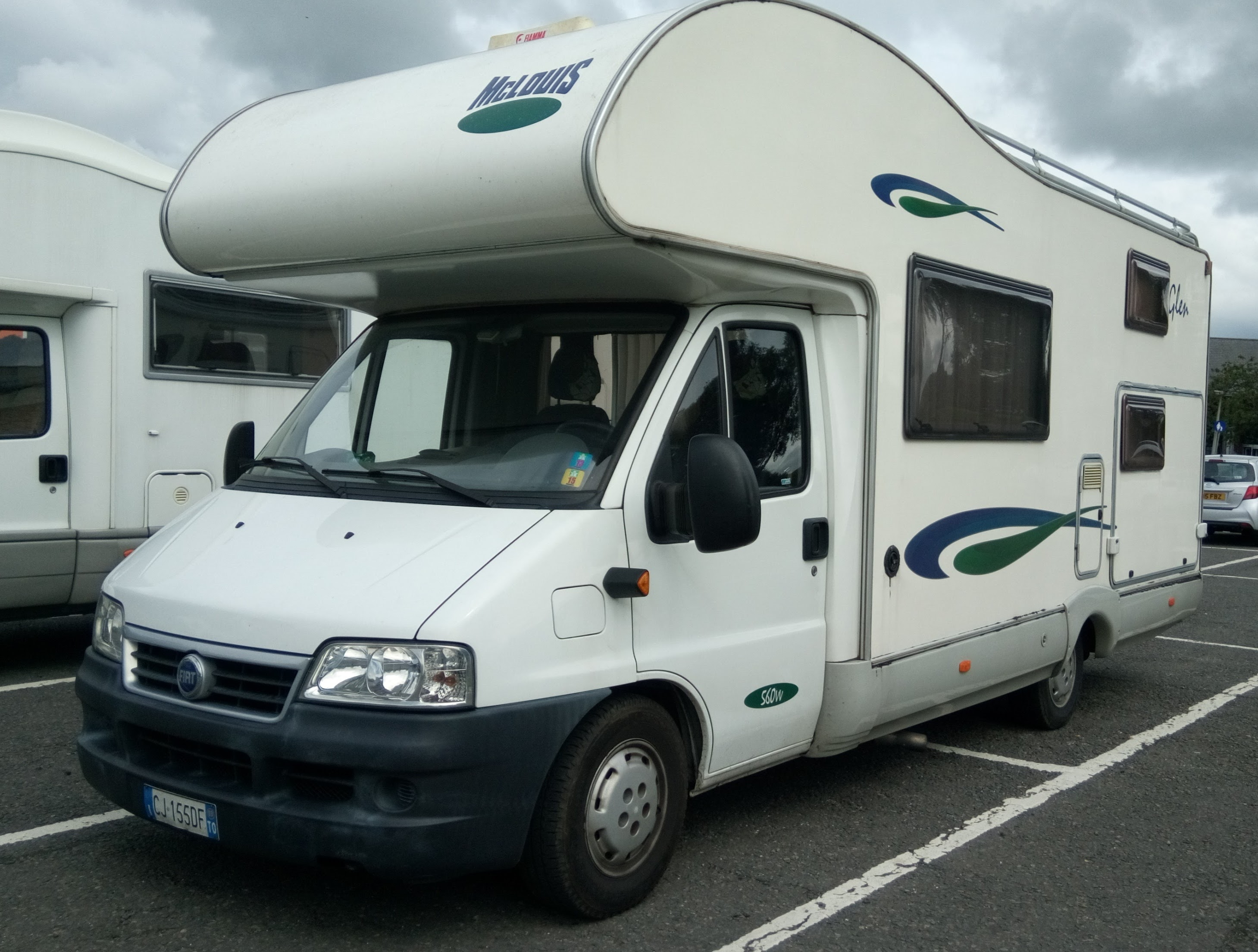
A coachbuilt Fiat Ducato campervan

A campervan, also referred to as a camper, caravanette, motorhome or RV (recreational vehicle) in North America, is a self-propelled vehicle that provides transport and sleeping accommodation, and usually cooking facilities. The term describes a van that has been fitted out, whereas a motorhome is one with a coachbuilt body.

== Ambiguity with motorhome ==
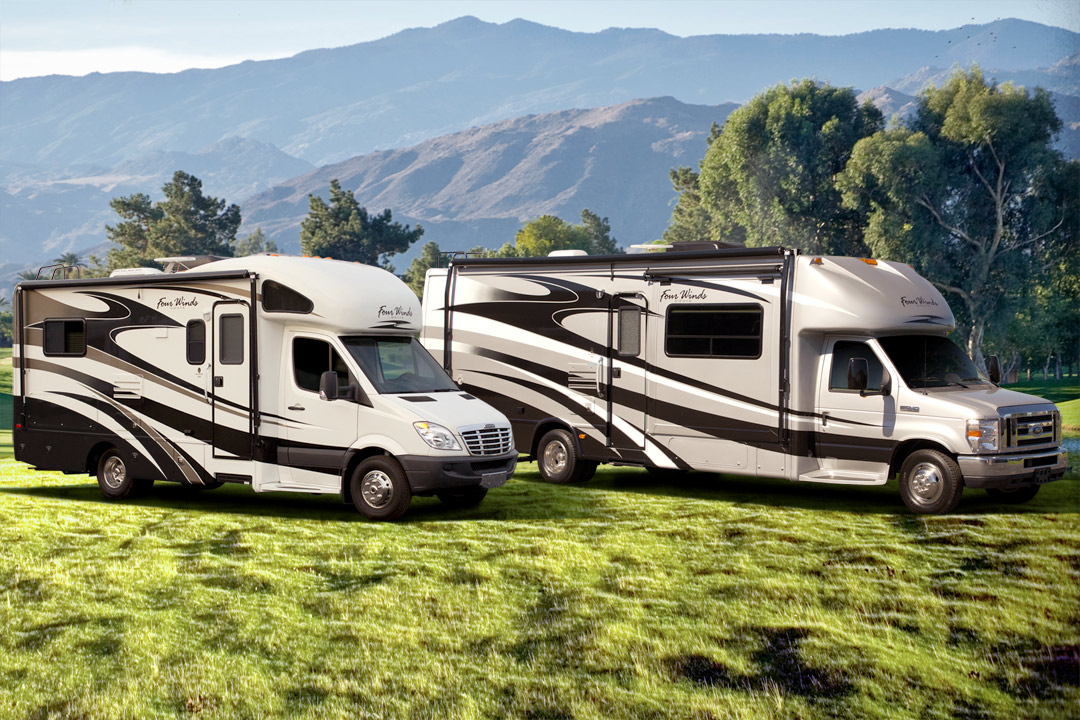
Two Class C campervans, a Freightliner Sprinter (left) and Ford E-Series (right) chassis.

The term motorhome is sometimes used interchangeably with campervan, but the former can also be a larger vehicle than a campervan and intended to be more comfortable, whilst the latter is more concerned with ease of movement and lower cost. For example, some campervans lack motorhome facilities such as built-in toilets and showers, or a divide between the living compartment and the cab.

== Features ==
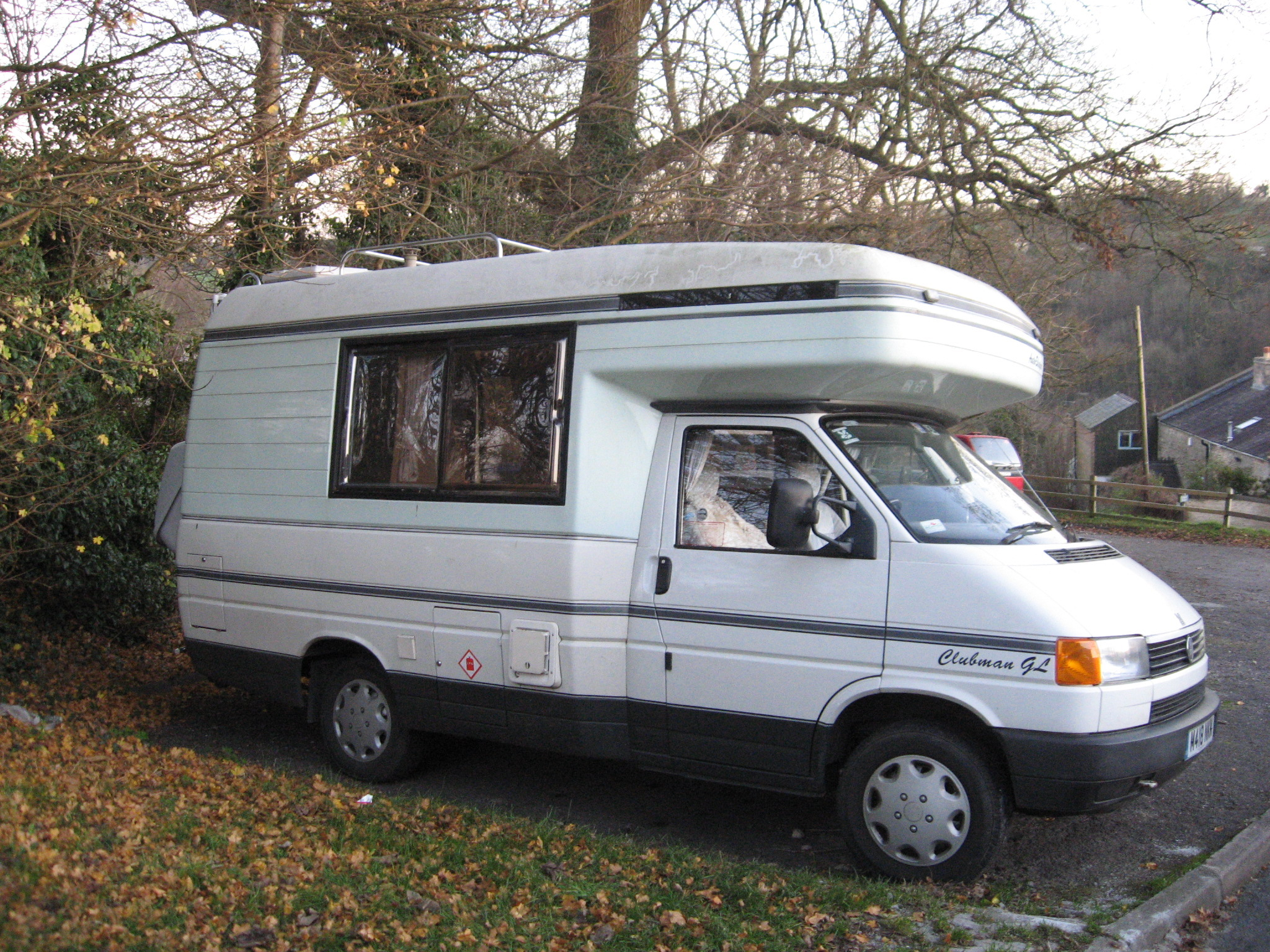
Volkswagen Autosleeper Clubman GL, a typical European campervan

Campervans may be equipped either with a "pop-up" roof which is raised during camping, or a fixed roof, either shared with the commercial van that forms the basis of the vehicle (commonly a "high-top" model), or as part of a custom coach-built body.

Campervans usually have a small kitchen with a refrigerator powered by gas, battery, or campsite mains electricity, and a two-burner gas hob and grill. They usually have dual-voltage lighting which can work from either a dedicated battery known as a deep-cycle or leisure battery, or from AC power supplied at a campsite. Larger models may include a water heater, space heating and air conditioning, a portable toilet and a shower. Smaller models often carry a portable toilet, and sometimes an external shower that operates within the privacy of an awning.

The term "Dormobile" is sometimes used generically in the United Kingdom due to a once highly popular conversion brand, and "Kombi" is used in Australia and other countries. The popularity of this type expanded in the 1950s after Volkswagen commissioned the Westfalia company to use the Kombi version of their Type 2 transporter as the basis for a campervan.

== Off-road variations ==
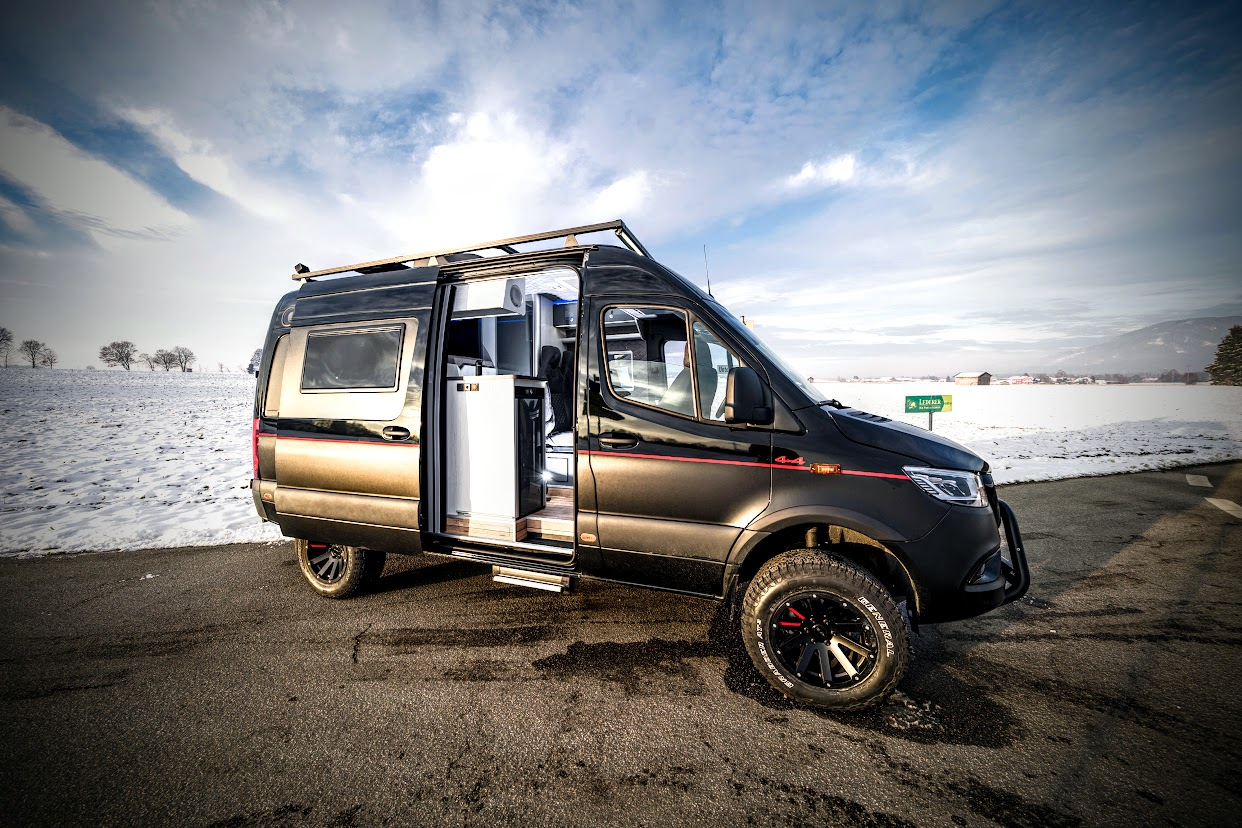
A Mercedes Sprinter-based campervan equipped with features that allow for off-roading

Off-road campervans are often referred to as 4WD or 4x4 campers. Some models include expandable tents mounted on the roof while others have pop-up roofs for additional sleeping space and storage.

Pop-up roof variants share certain design elements with roof tents as sometimes fitted to more robust four wheel drive off-road vehicles intended for expeditions rather than relaxed camping. A compromise between these two purposes is sometimes reached by basing the conversion on an off-road vehicle. Sometimes the conversion is demountable from the back of a pick-up truck body.

== Self-build campervan conversions ==
During the 2020–2023 COVID-19 pandemic, converting vans into self-contained motorhomes or campervans became popular among people who wanted to own a motorhome or campervan but could not afford to buy one

Conversion involves replacing the existing interior of the van by new components. This can include insulating and lining the van, cutting and fitting furniture, installing electrical systems, new windows, a pop-up top and plumbing-in a sink and water supply. It is possible to do a hybrid conversion where large elements such as roof, windows and bed are installed by a professional company and the owner then completes the job. Gas installation must be carried out or certified by a qualified tradesperson.

Insurance for a DIY campervan requires a policy flexible enough to cover the vehicle while it is a van, during the conversion process and when it is a completed campervan.

== Classic Volkswagen and other campervans ==
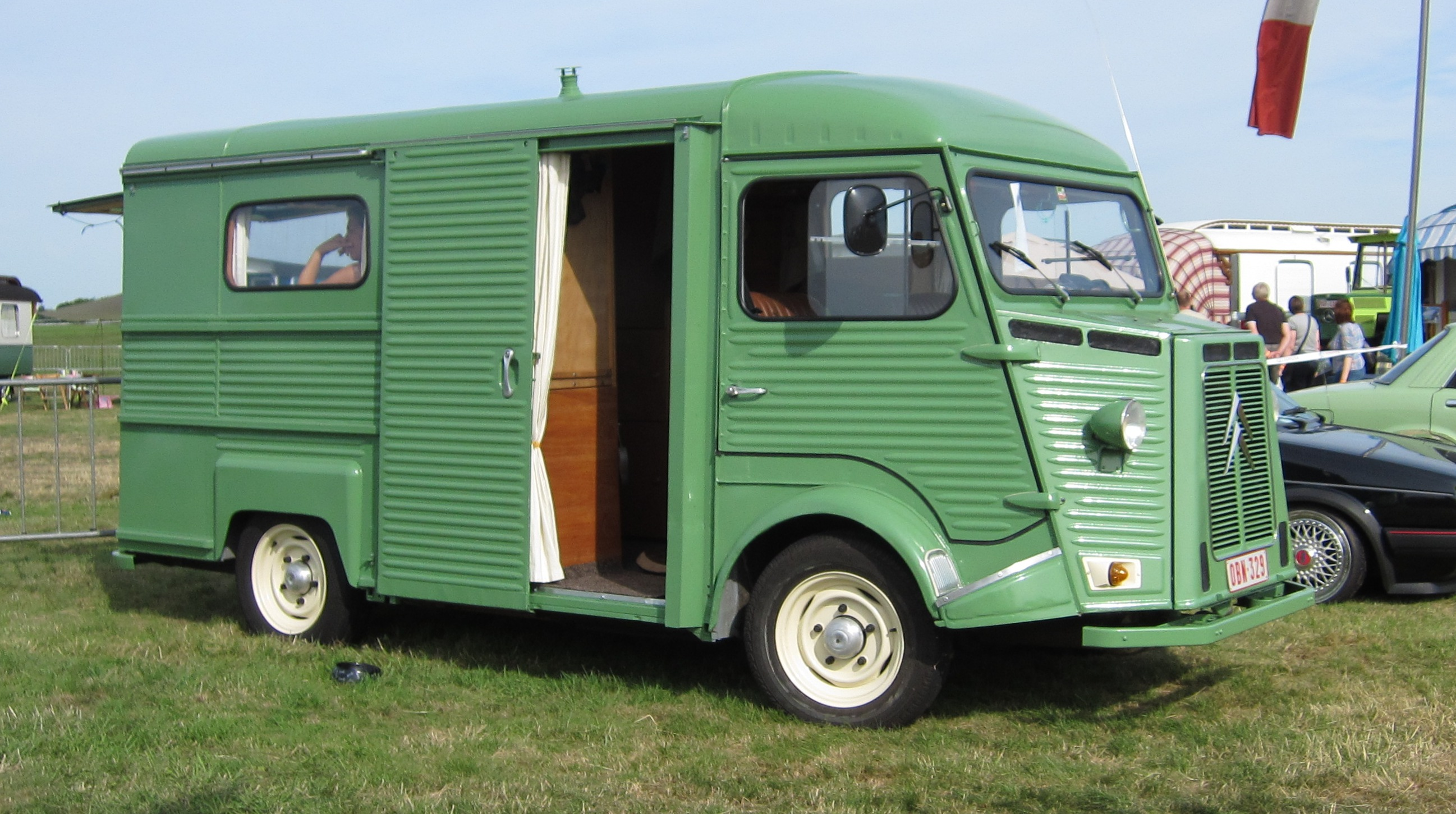
Dutch-built version – with non-suicide doors – of Citroën H-Van Camper

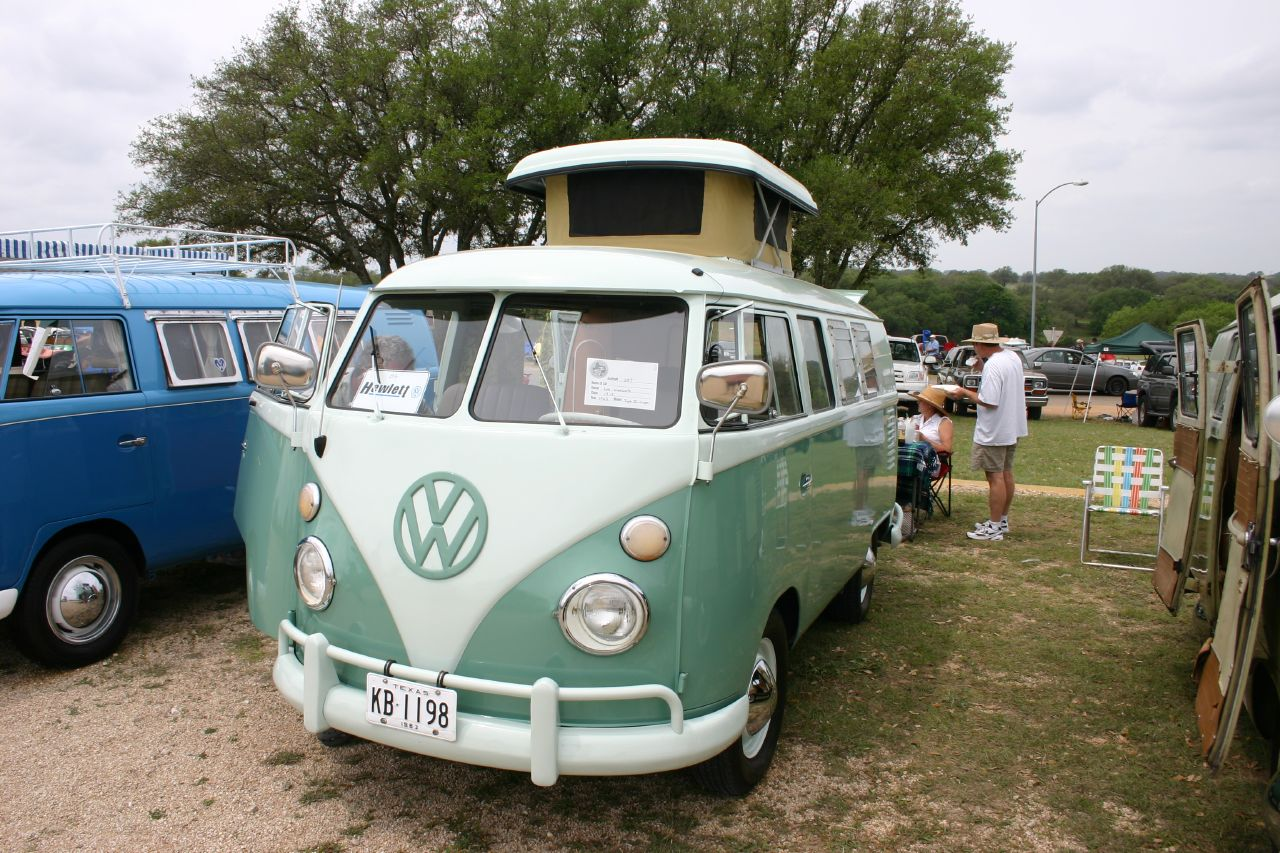
Classic Volkswagen Camper

There are several types of campervan manufactured by Volkswagen; depending on their age, they are colloquially referred to as either a splitty (split windscreen), a bay (bay framed windscreen), or a bricky ("brick" shaped van).

Although less popular, Mercedes also manufactured a similar-sized light van, and conversions were reasonably common in the 1960s and 1970s. Of a similar size and vintage is the British Commer Spacevan conversion.

In Europe, the Citroën H-Van has also been used as a base for many campervan conversions, and is popular amongst Dutch and Belgian users in particular. Ex-factory, it had several height and length configurations, and in all versions it had a low floor and high ceiling, a legacy of one of its original uses as a mobile shop. It does not usually need a pop-top to accommodate its users.

Modern mid-sized Japanese vans such as the Toyota Hiace are sometimes converted to have the appearance of a classic Volkswagen.

== New concept car camper ==
The car camper is an estate car (UK) or a station wagon (USA) converted into a travel home. The rear cargo area is converted into a full double bed area usually with a fabricated aluminium framework. All equipment necessary to set up a well-appointed camp site is stored under the double bed with access through lidded areas under the bed. Unlike a standard station wagon where the camping equipment has to be removed before sleeping or a tent set up, the car camper is self-contained.

== British and European size and type classifications ==
=== A-class (AC) ===
Similar to North American A-class recreational vehicles (sometimes known generically as "Winnebagos") but generally still smaller in Europe. Fully coachbuilt over a medium-to-large van chassis, from 7.5 tonnes and upwards. Highly appointed, sometimes with electrically operated slide-out (sideways) extensions to the living space, electricity-generating windmills and in very large models (of North American scale) sometimes even fitted with a hydraulically operated garage capable of transporting a small car.

Smaller (sub 7.5 tonnes) A-class vehicles are also popular in Europe, similar in size to overcab coachbuilts, but without the base vehicle's cab. In its place, a (wider) cab is added, which allows for a drop-down bed to be fitted above. Recognisable by their large curved windscreens.

=== Overcab (OC) ===
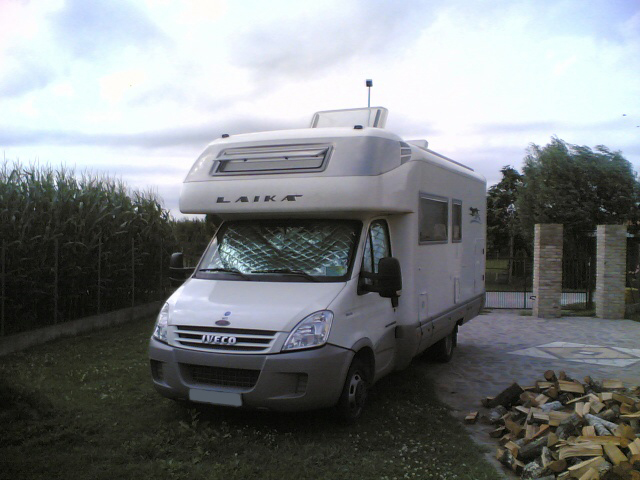
Typical "overcab" camper on a relatively large Iveco van base

Coachbuilt body, retaining the base van's cab, with a raised Luton van style area over the cab containing a bed. Other beds may be fixed in place, built by moving seats and tables, or lowered from the ceiling. Shower and toilet cubicles usually fitted. Sometimes including a garage for bikes, and may be large enough to support a mechanism for towing a small city car. Roughly comparable to the North American C-class (CC).

Common base vehicles include the Fiat Ducato, Renault Master, and Ford Transit.

=== Low profile (LP) ===
Coachbuilt but without a raised bed over the cab. Other beds may be fixed in place, built by moving seats and tables, or lowered from the ceiling. Shower and toilet cubicles usually fitted. Garages and towing fittings may be carried as with the overcab designs.

Typical base vehicles are lighter-duty or smaller-engined variants of the same vehicles used for overcab designs.

=== High top (HT) ===
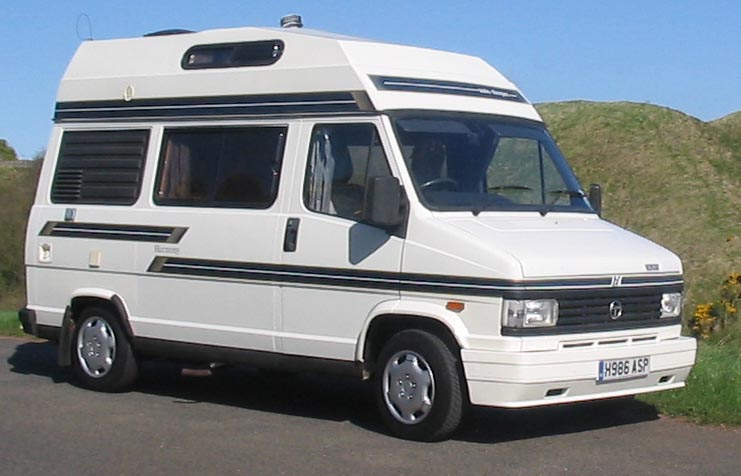
Autosleeper Harmony "high top" Campervan

Based on a high-top van, typically of around 2.8 to 4.5 tonnes gross vehicle weight, without major coachbuilding modifications to the body. Beds typically fixed in place or built by moving seats and tables. Shower and toilet cubicles sometimes fitted.

Typical base vehicles are the same as for the coachbuilt designs, above. Often, a Dodge, GMC or Ford van will be professionally converted into a high top.

=== Rising roof (RR) ===
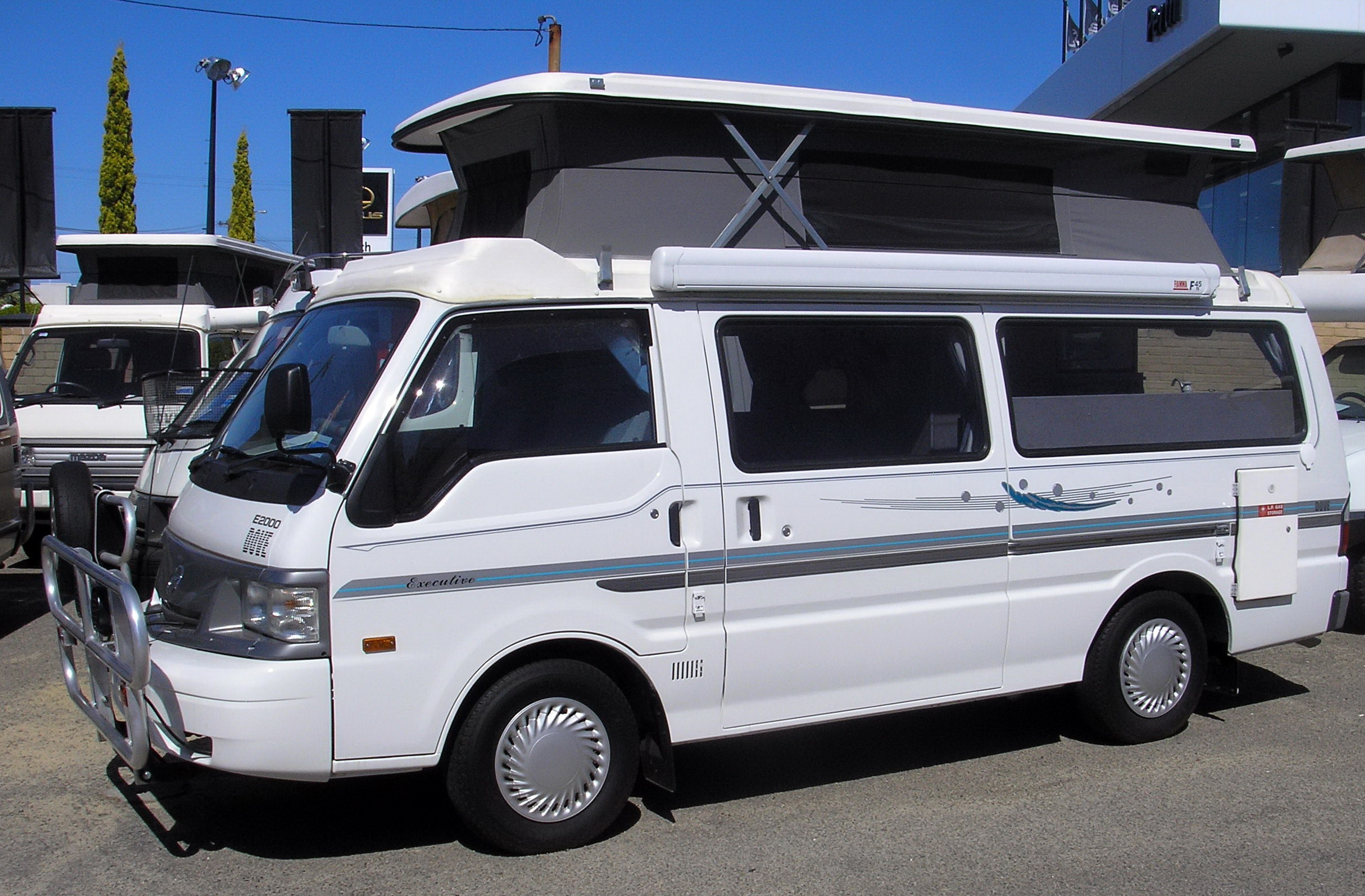
Mazda E2000 (Bongo) "rising roof" campervan

Often based on a relatively small van, typically 2 to 3 tonnes gross vehicle weight, including the classic Volkswagen Type 2, and with a roof which raises, usually with fabric sides, in a way not unlike a roof tent. Bed typically in the rising roof but also sometimes built by moving seats and tables. A rising roof is also sometimes used to allow for standing room in the vehicle. Shower and toilet cubicles rarely fitted.

The Volkswagen Transporter is a common base vehicle, and Ford Transits are also reasonably common.

=== Fixed roof (FR) ===
Also known as "surf vans" (or "surf buses") and "day vans". Typically similar in size to the rising roof designs. Beds usually built by moving seats and tables. Shower and toilet cubicles very rarely fitted.

The Volkswagen Transporter and Mercedes-Benz Vito are particularly common base vehicles. They have become the successors to the classic Volkswagen Type 2. Slightly smaller vans such as the Fiat Scudo may be used; on occasion, even smaller vans such as the Fiat Doblò are used to make casual light-duty campers with minimal facilities beyond sleeping space.

=== Dismountable (DM) ===
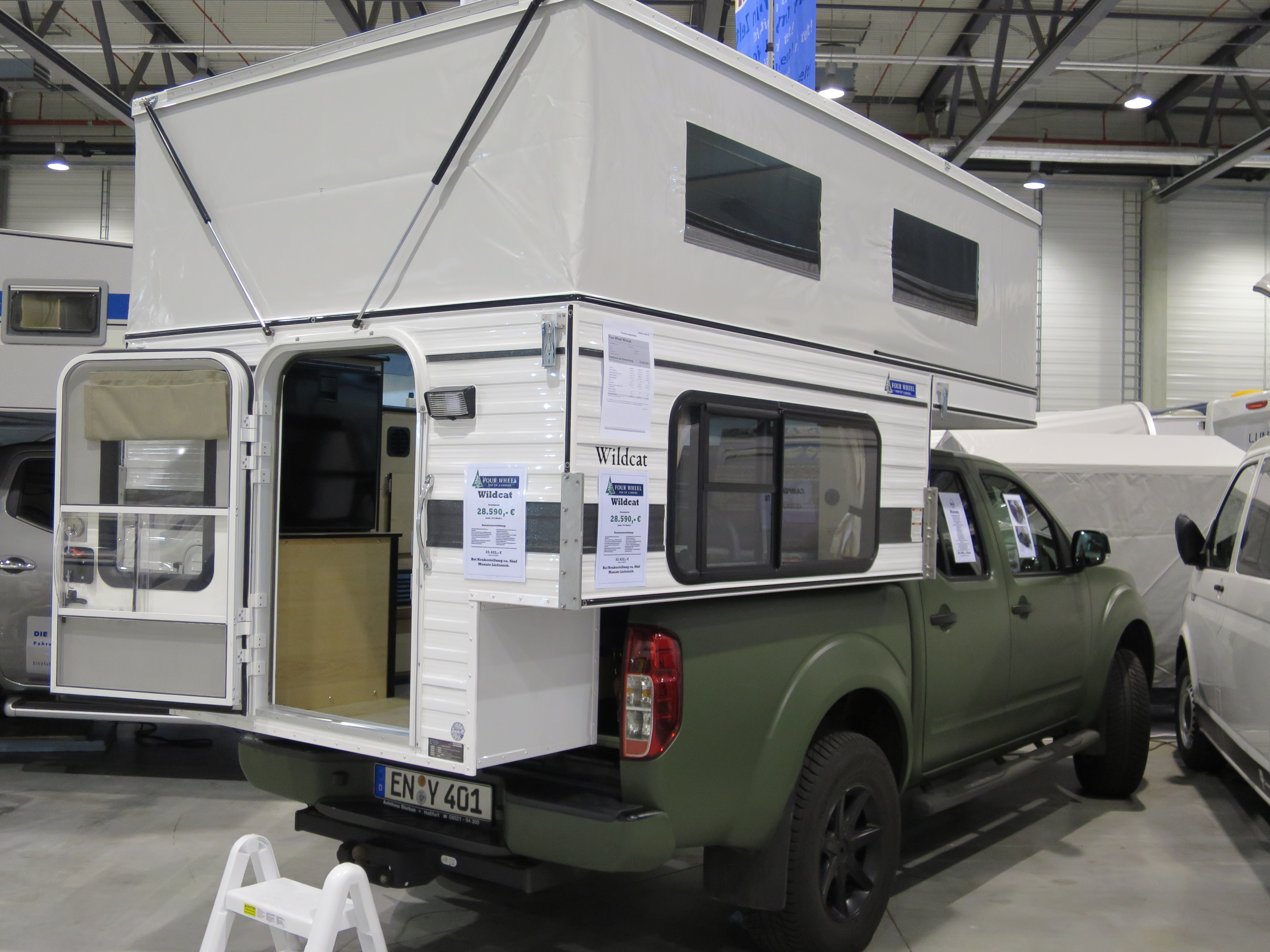
Nissan Navara Dismountable camper

A coachbuilt body sits on a (sometimes modified) pick-up load-bed, and generally removable at campsites to allow the vehicle to be used.

Ford, Toyota, Nissan and Mitsubishi vehicles are common bases.

=== B-class (BC) ===
This term is not commonly used except for imported North American models, which may vary greatly in size from semi-low profile coachbuilts to van conversions. Typically, a van chassis is provided without interior or some exterior features as an "incomplete vehicle" by an automobile manufacturer, and upfitted with RV amenities by a coachbuilder. It is then sold as a completed RV and usually has safety standards certification from the RV Industry Association.

== North American van conversions ==
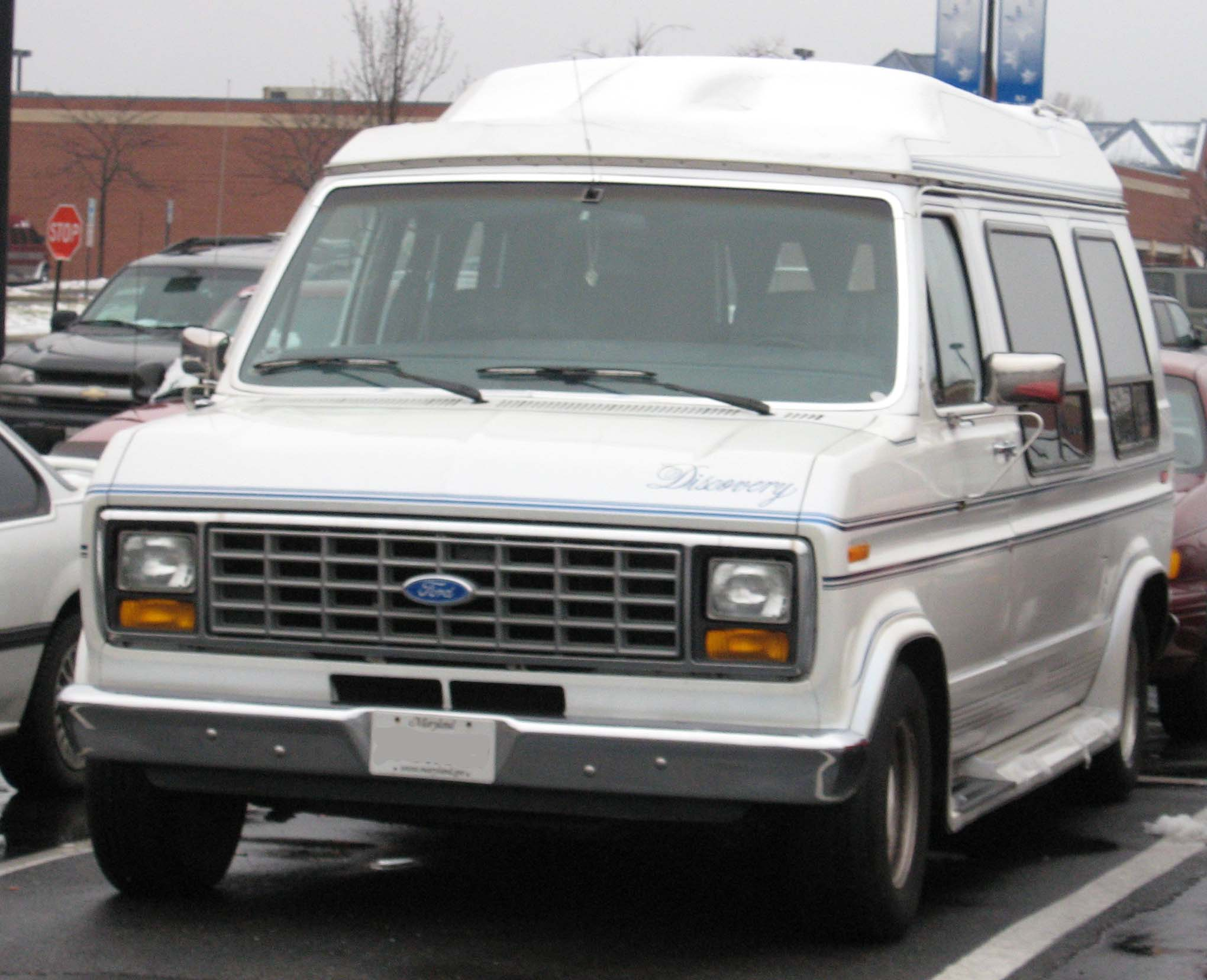
Ford Econoline van conversion

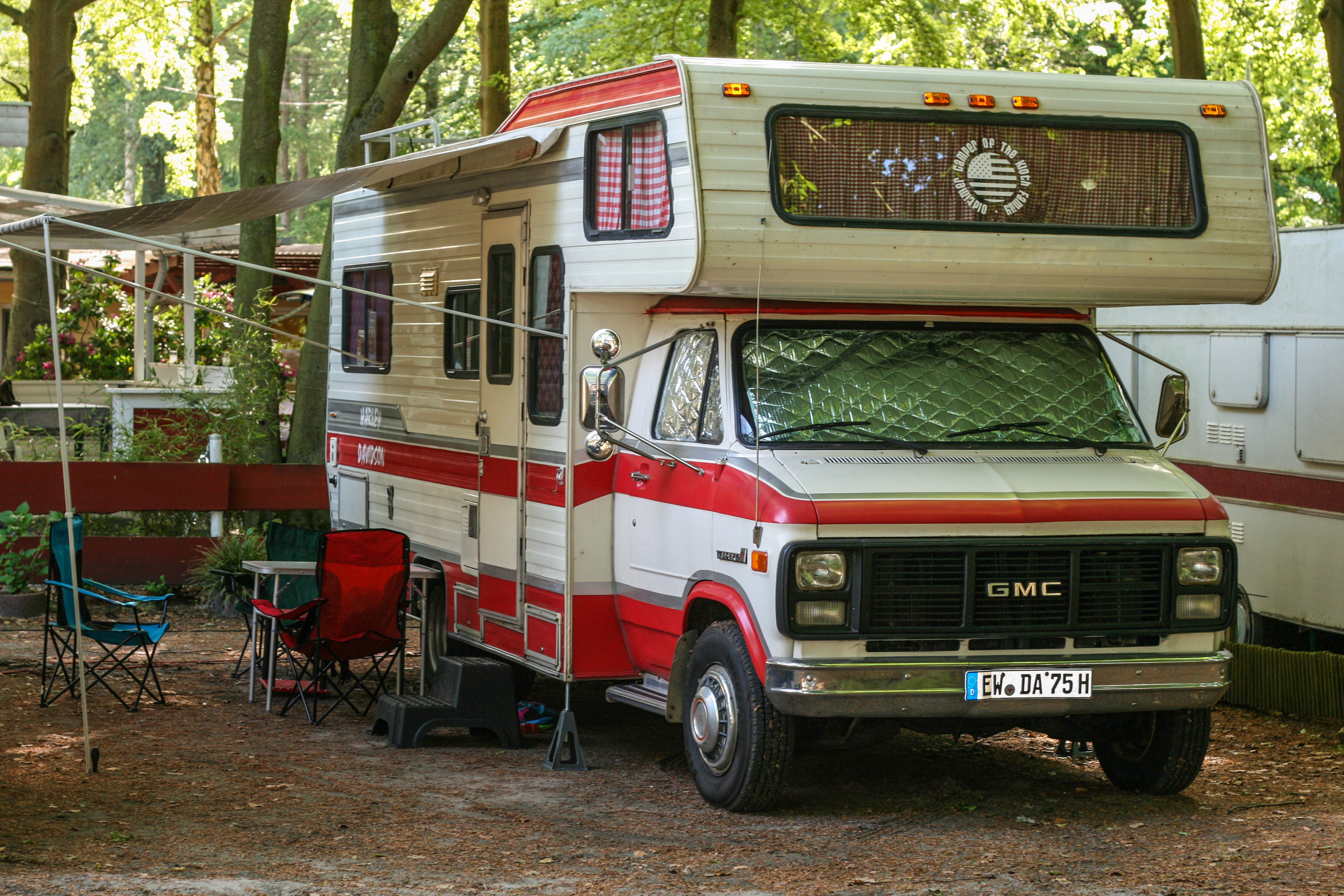
GMC Vandura

There are many manufacturers of campervans in North America. Since the 1970s, Japanese vans such as the Toyota HiAce and the Datsun Urvan, and European models based on the Ford Transit, Fiat Ducato and Bedford vans, have become popular as base vehicles for conversions.

== Amenities ==
A modern campervan may contain:

- Propane gas or electric-powered refrigerator
- Propane gas or electric cooktop, grill, or both
- Microwave oven
- Oven
- Propane gas- or electric-powered water heater
- One or more beds, some of which double-up as daytime seating
- Electricity supplied by "house" battery or external hook-up
- Built-in or cassette toilet with removable disposal tank – a flushing toilet with access usually outside the campervan for easy emptying. Some models have a swivel system for extra space.
- Shower
- Television (with an aerial, satellite dish, or both)
- Air conditioning (at least the normal vehicle's cab system)
- Room heater or central heating
- Potable water tank
- Wastewater tank for "grey" (wash) water and black (sewer) water
- Extendable external awning – an extendable canvas shade that offers protection from the sun.
- Generator – powered by gasoline, diesel or propane
- Solar panels – for additional electricity generation
- Bike rack – a bicycle carrying device, usually fixed to the rear of the campervan.

== See also ==
- Campervan hire agency
- Caravan park
- Conversion van
- Motorhome
- Recreational vehicle
- Travel trailer
