= Volkswagen Transporter =

Series of vans

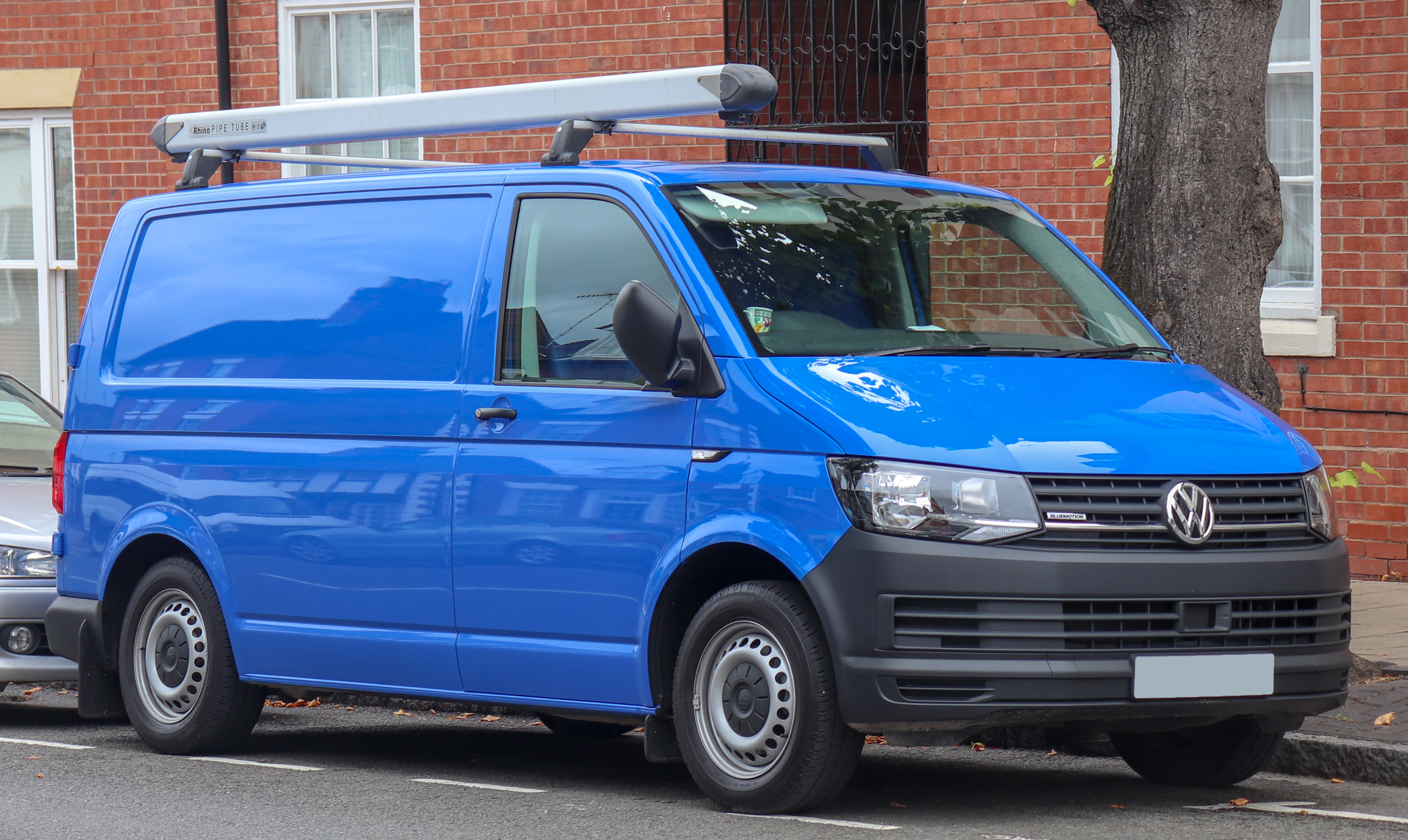

Overview
- Manufacturer: Volkswagen Commercial Vehicles
- Also called: Volkswagen Type 2 (until 2002); Kombi
- Production: November 1949 – present
- Assembly: Germany: Hanover

Body and chassis
- Class: Light commercial vehicle/Large MPV (Multivan/Caravelle) (M)
- Body style: Van (cargo/passenger); Minibus; Campervan; Pickup truck; Crew cab; Chassis cab

The Volkswagen Transporter, (formerly based on the Volkswagen Group's T platform), now in its seventh generation using a platform shared with Ford, refers to a series of vans produced for over 70 years and marketed worldwide.

The T series was considered an official Volkswagen Group automotive platform. and generations are sequentially named T1, T2, T3, T4, T5, T6 and T7. Pre-dating the T platform designations, the first three generations were named Type 2, indicating their relative position to the Type 1, or Beetle. As part of the T platform, the first three generations are retroactively named T1, T2 and T3.

The Transporter is the best-selling van in history with over 12 million units sold worldwide, and it comprises a gamut of variants including vans, minivans / minibuses, campervans, and chassis cab and pickup trucks. Competitors include the Ford Transit, Toyota HiAce and Mercedes-Benz Vito.

== Type 2 ==
=== T1 (1950) ===
Initially derived from the Volkswagen Type 1 (Volkswagen Beetle), the Volkswagen Type 2 (T1) was the first generation of Volkswagen's Transporter family.

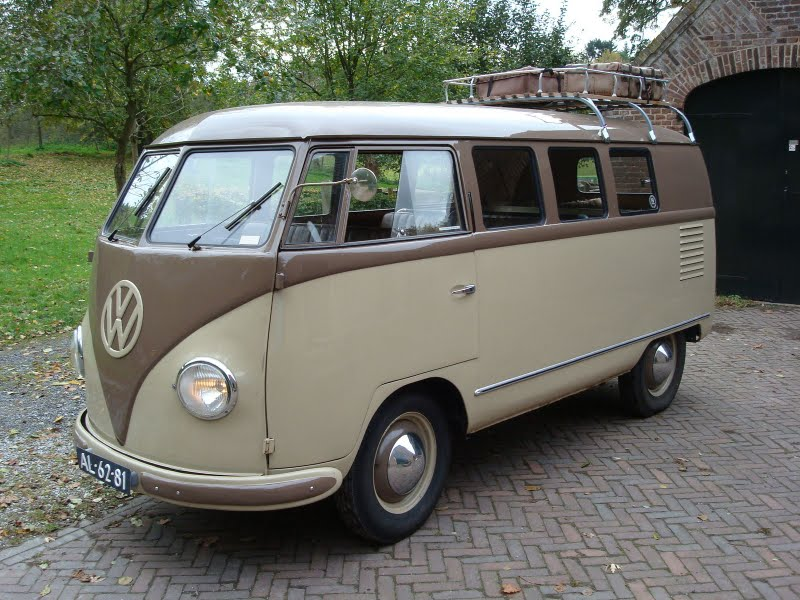
T1 (front)

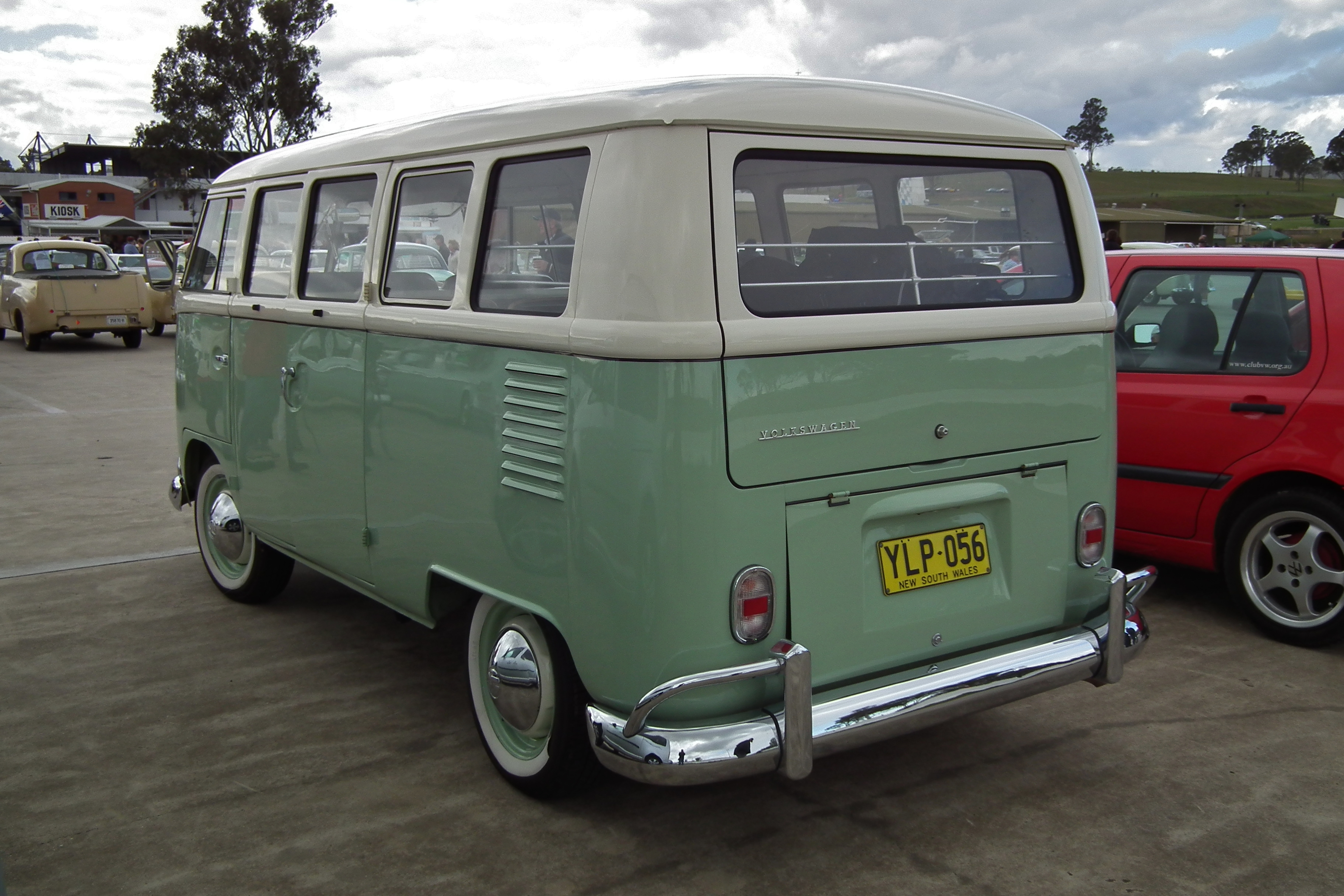
T1 (rear)

=== T2 (1967) ===
The Volkswagen T2 platform was marketed from 1967 through 1979 model years, with a Volkswagen Type 4 engine optionally available from 1972 on.

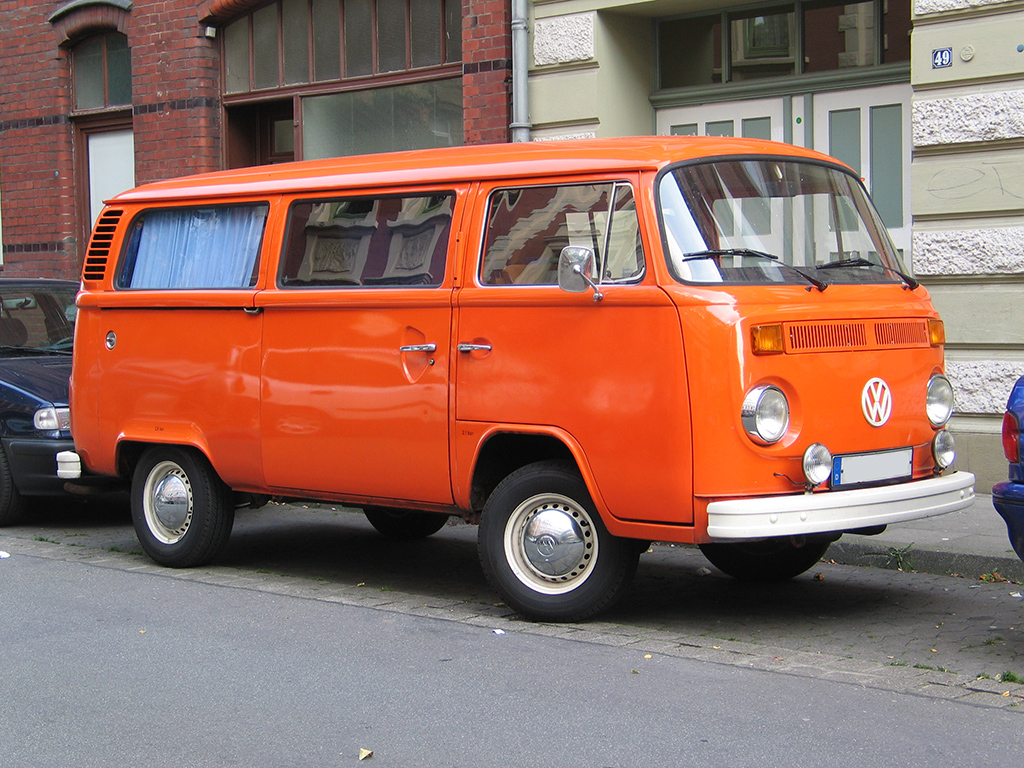
T2

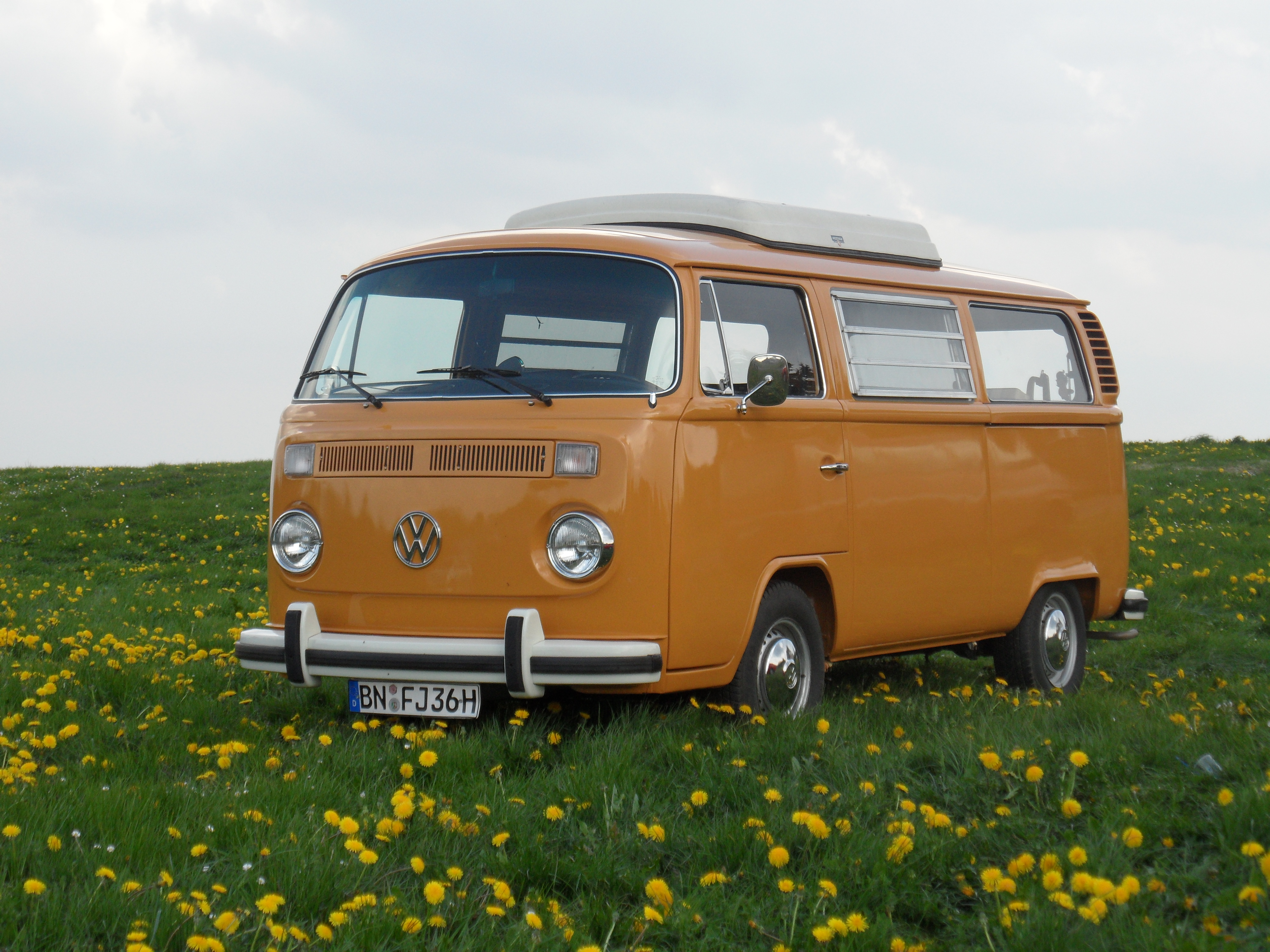
T2b Camper

=== T3 (1979) ===
The Volkswagen (Type 2) T3 Transporter, also known as T25 in the UK or VW Vanagon in the United States, was introduced in 1979. The T3 Transporter was one of the last all-new bodied Volkswagen platforms that still used an air-cooled, rear-engine design.

Compared to its predecessor, (the T2), the T3 was sturdier and heavier, with a slightly larger, much more square and boxy body, that offered more usable interior space than the original models' rounded front side, roof, and edges. The T3, with its front now folding sharply along a horizontal middle axis, instead of the old model's curve, is sometimes called "the wedge" by enthusiasts, to differentiate it from earlier VW "Kombis".

The Volkswagen air-cooled boxer engine was supplanted by a water-cooled one – though still rear-mounted – in 1983. Both Porsche and Oettinger built six-cylinder versions of the T3 Transporter in very small numbers, with the Porsche-built version achieving a top speed around 200 km/h (125 mph).

A four-wheel drive Syncro model was introduced, premiering in January 1985.

While production of the T3 ended in Europe with the Syncro produced in Austria until 1992, the T3 was also produced in South Africa, until 2002.

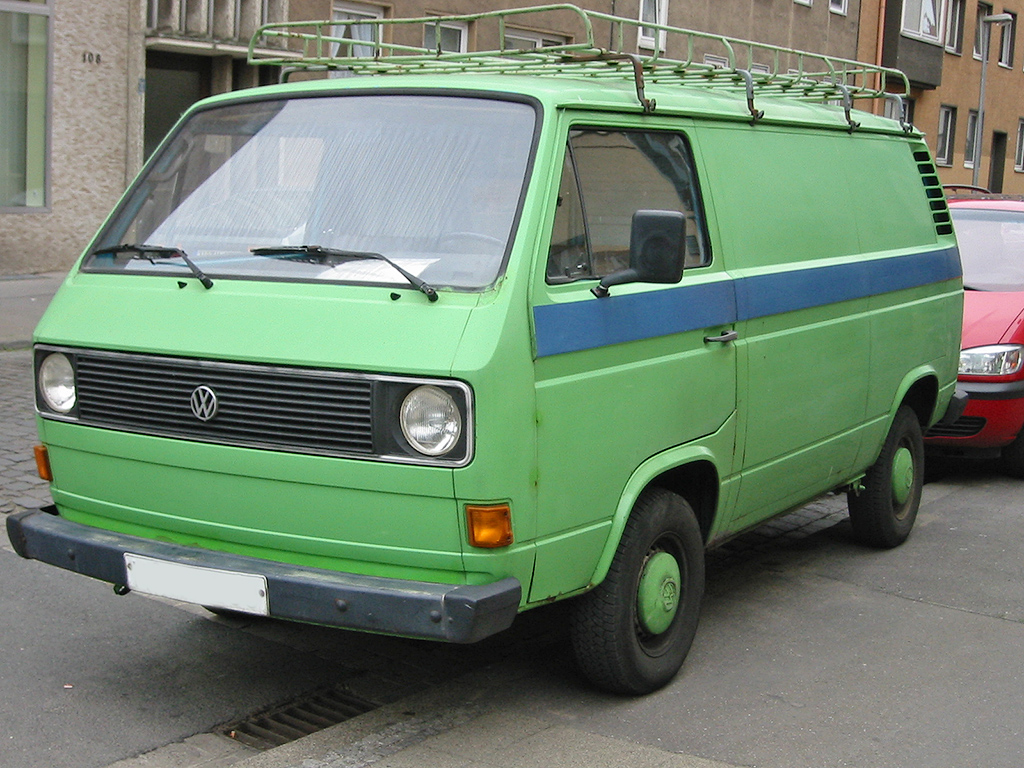
T3 (front)

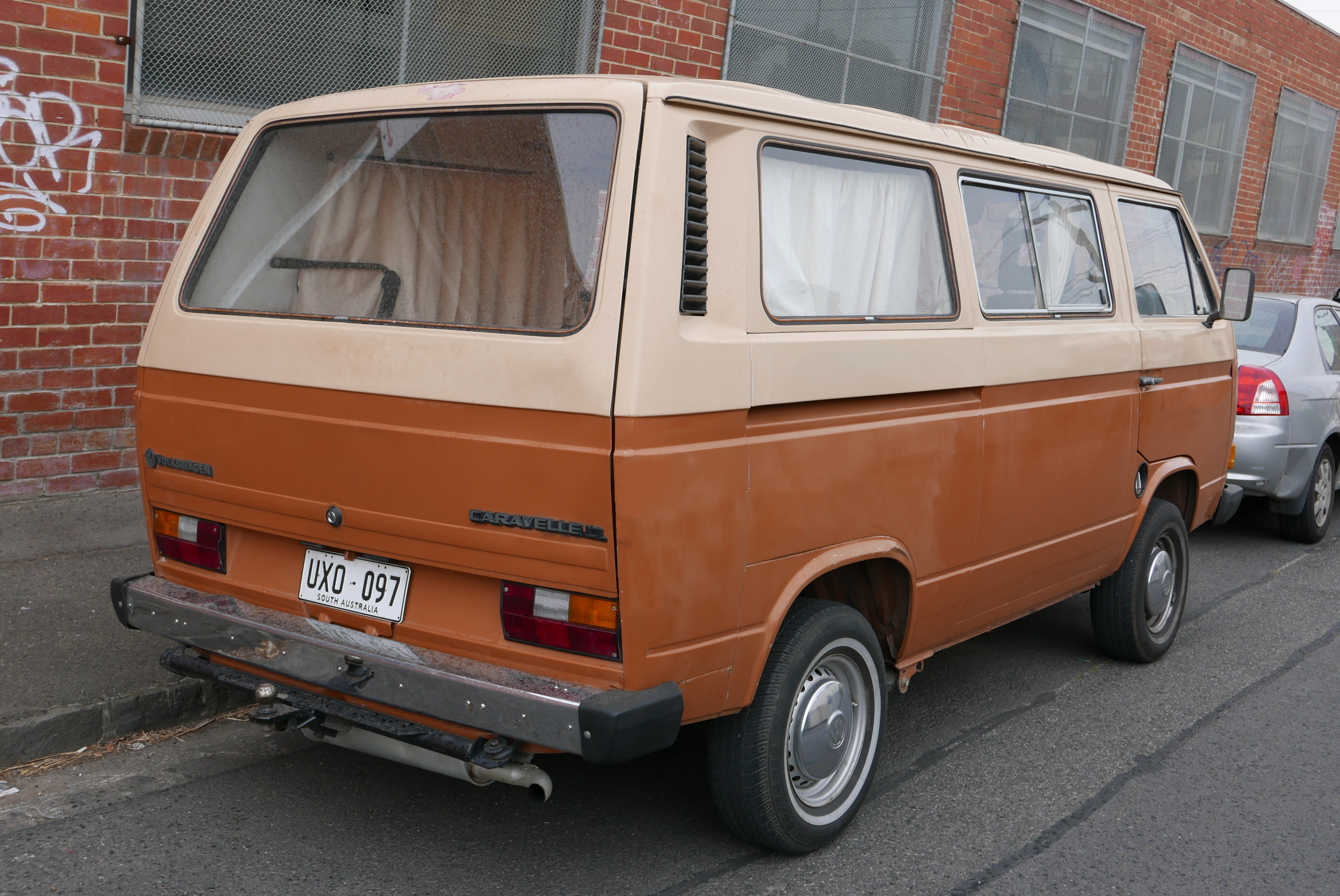
T3 (rear)

== Transporter/Multivan ==
=== T4 (1990) ===
The first officially designated "T platform" vehicle, the Volkswagen Transporter (T4) dramatically updated the Volkswagen van line by using a front-mounted, front-wheel drive, water-cooled engine. The T4 was marketed in North America as the Volkswagen Eurovan.

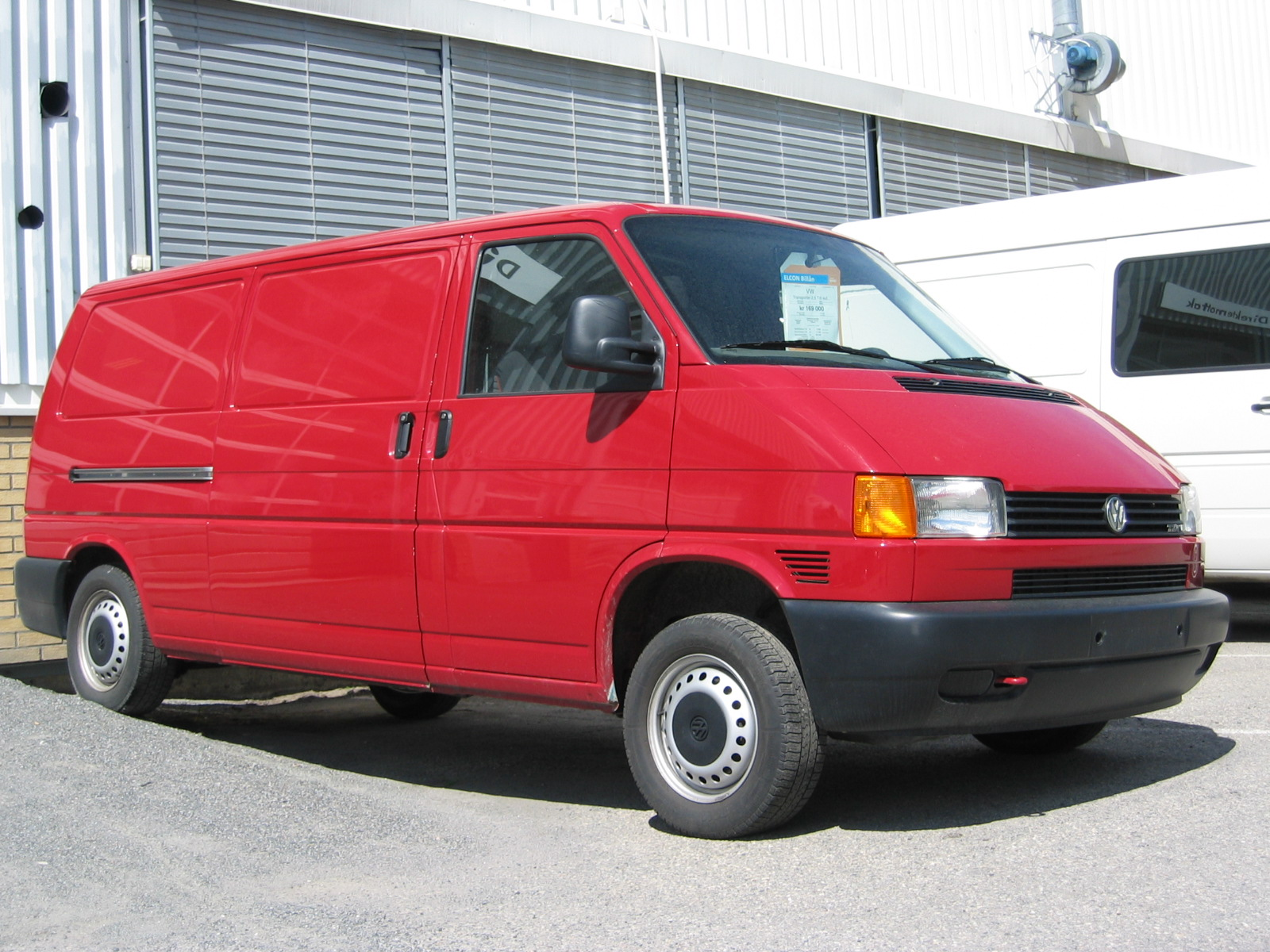
T4 (front)

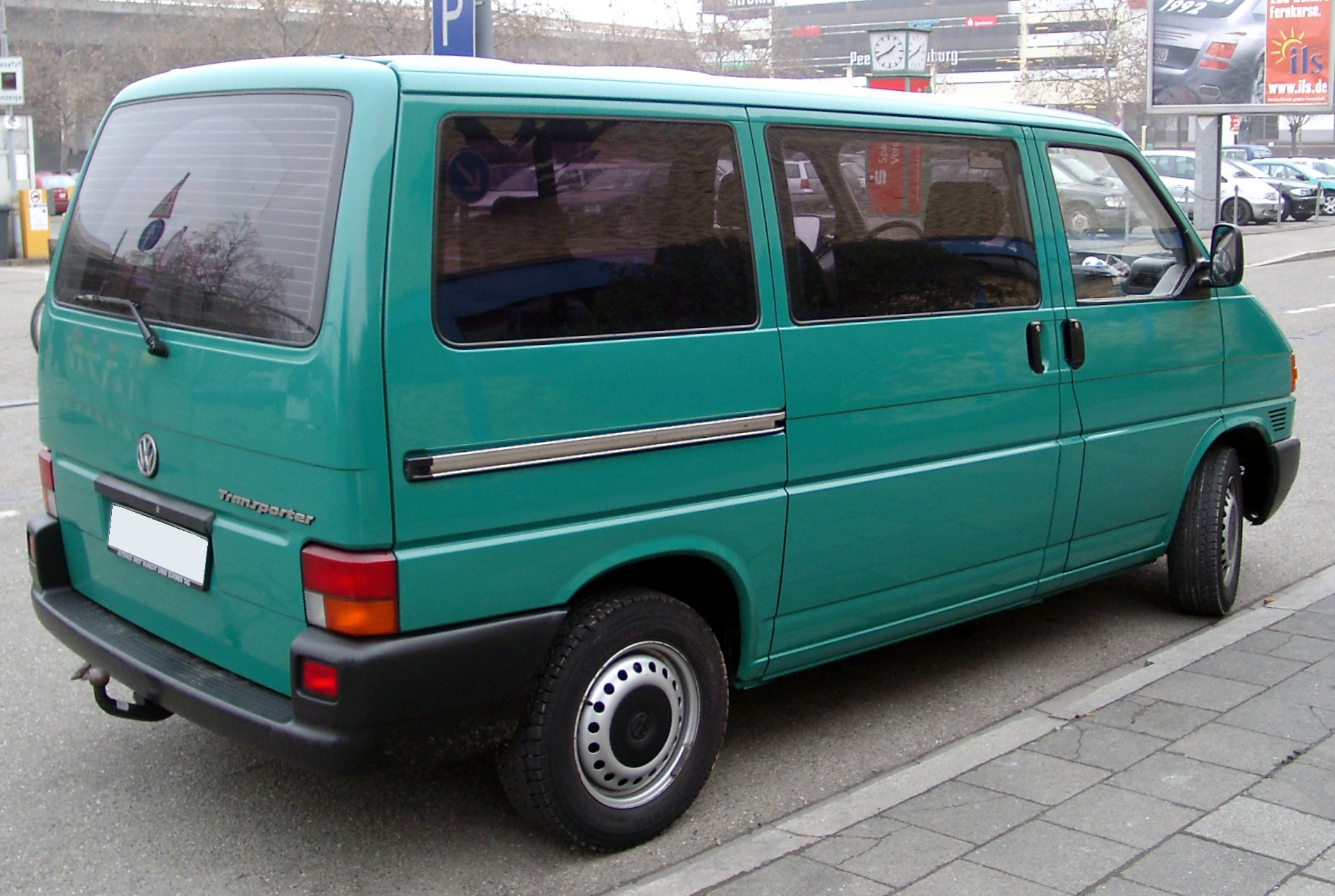
T4 (rear)

=== T5 (2003) ===
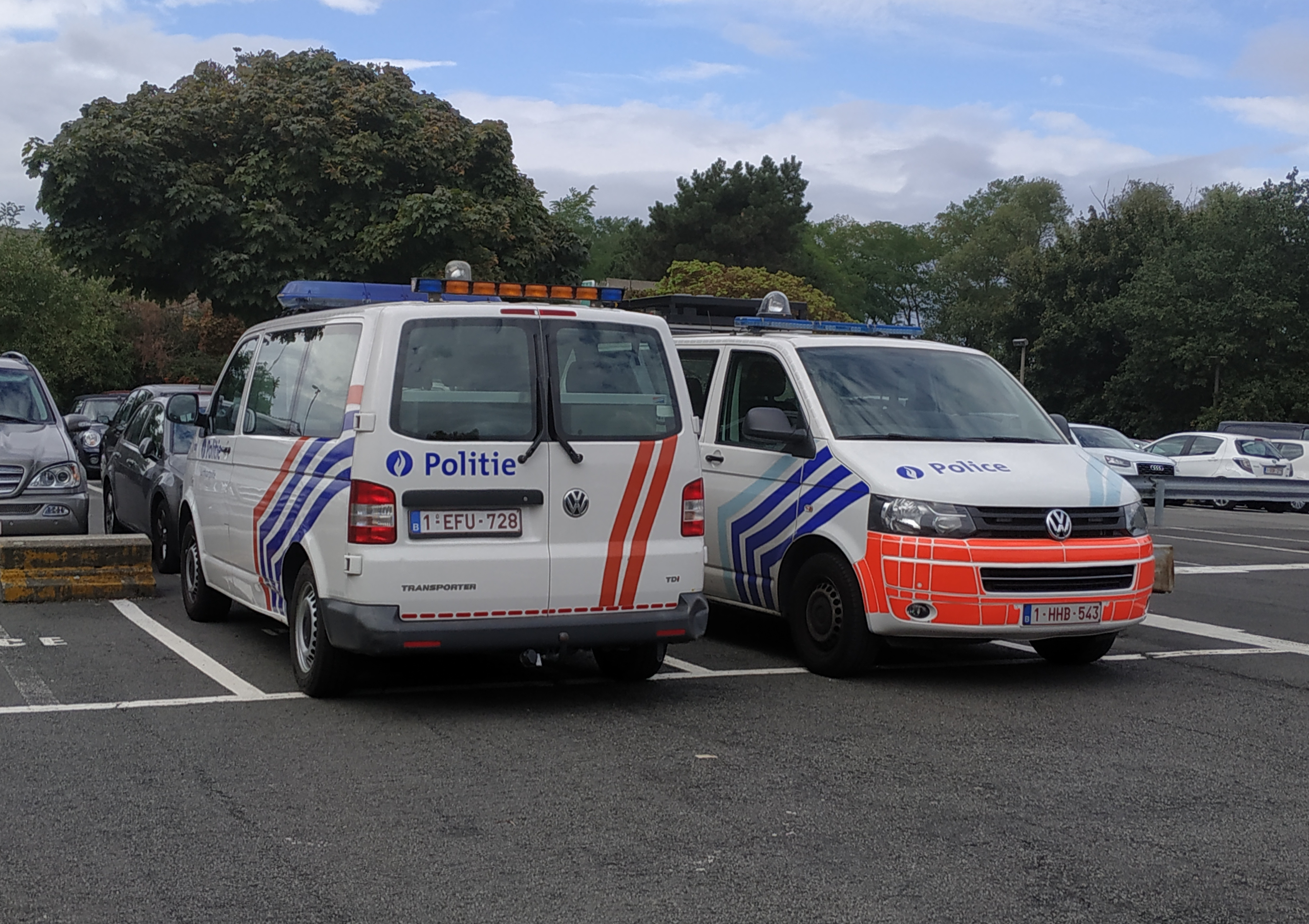
Two vehicles of the Belgian police: Federal on the left (two orange stripes on the rear door and a single one on the side) and local on the right (light blue stripes)

==== 2003 (pre-facelift) ====
The Volkswagen Transporter (T5) is a variant of the Volkswagen T platform. In North America it was sold in Mexico but not in the United States nor Canada. As with other light trucks, the T5 range would face a 25% tariff, known as the chicken tax, if imported to the US.

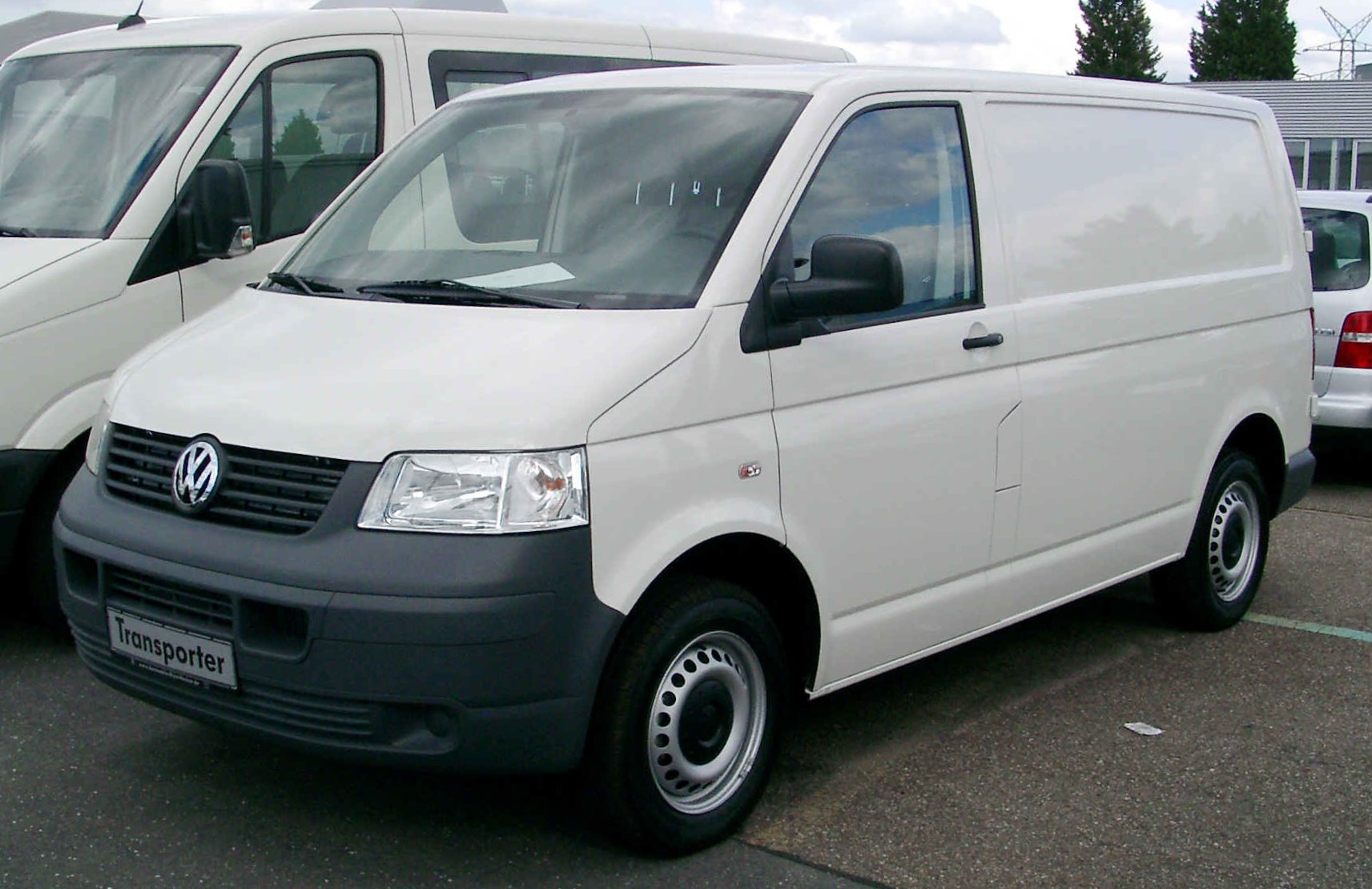
T5 (front; pre-facelift)

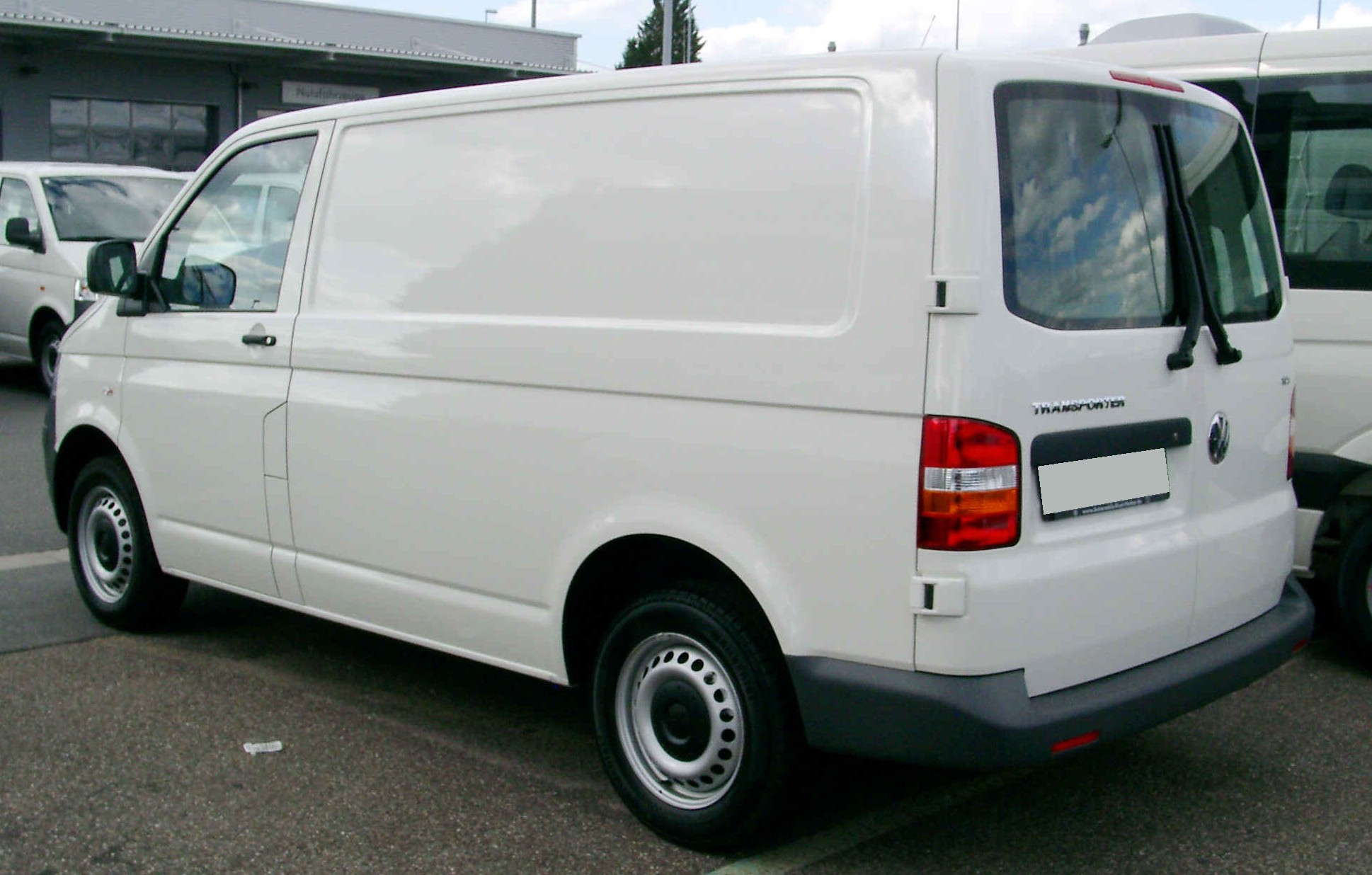
T5 (rear; pre-facelift)

==== 2009 (facelift) ====
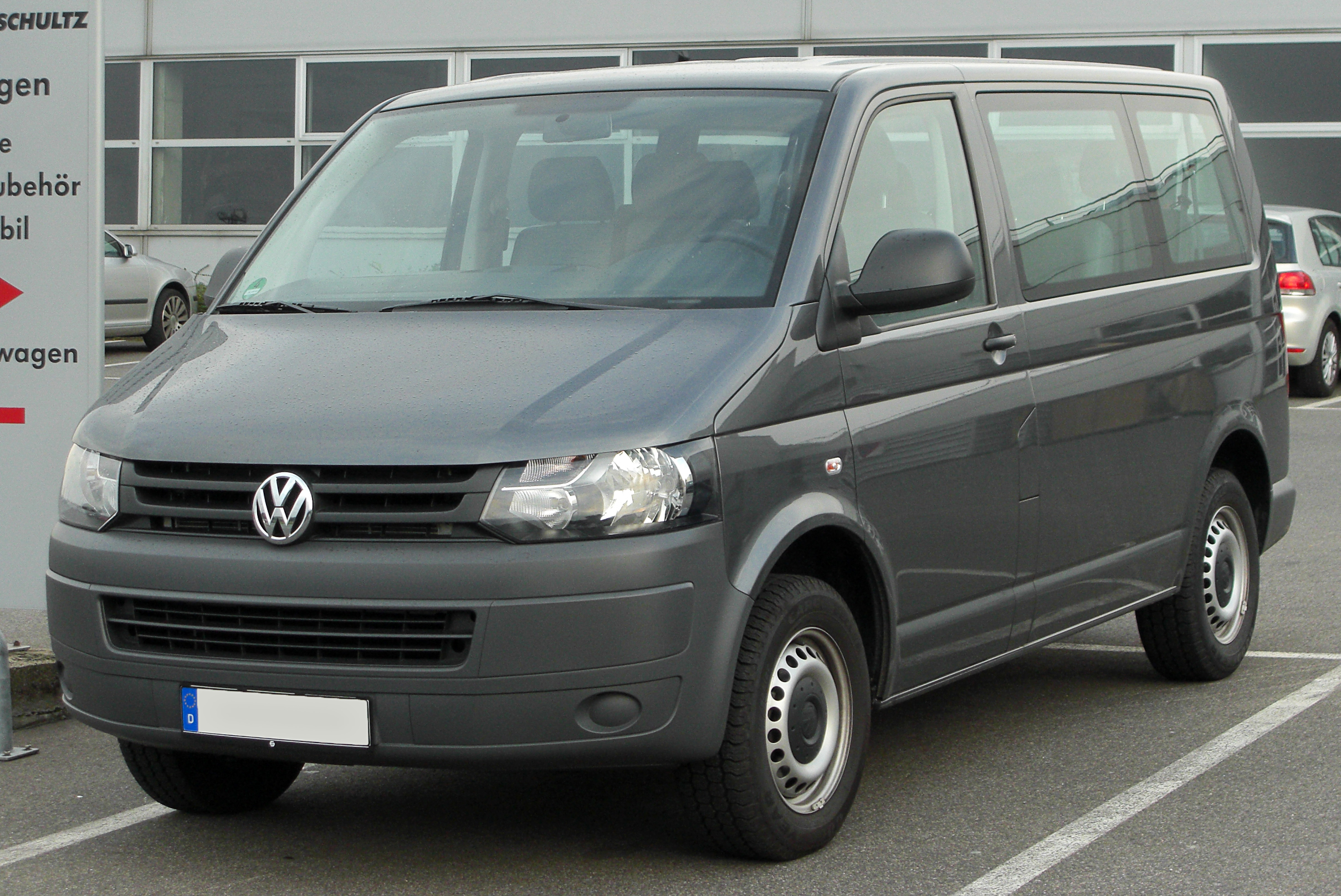
T5 (front; facelift)

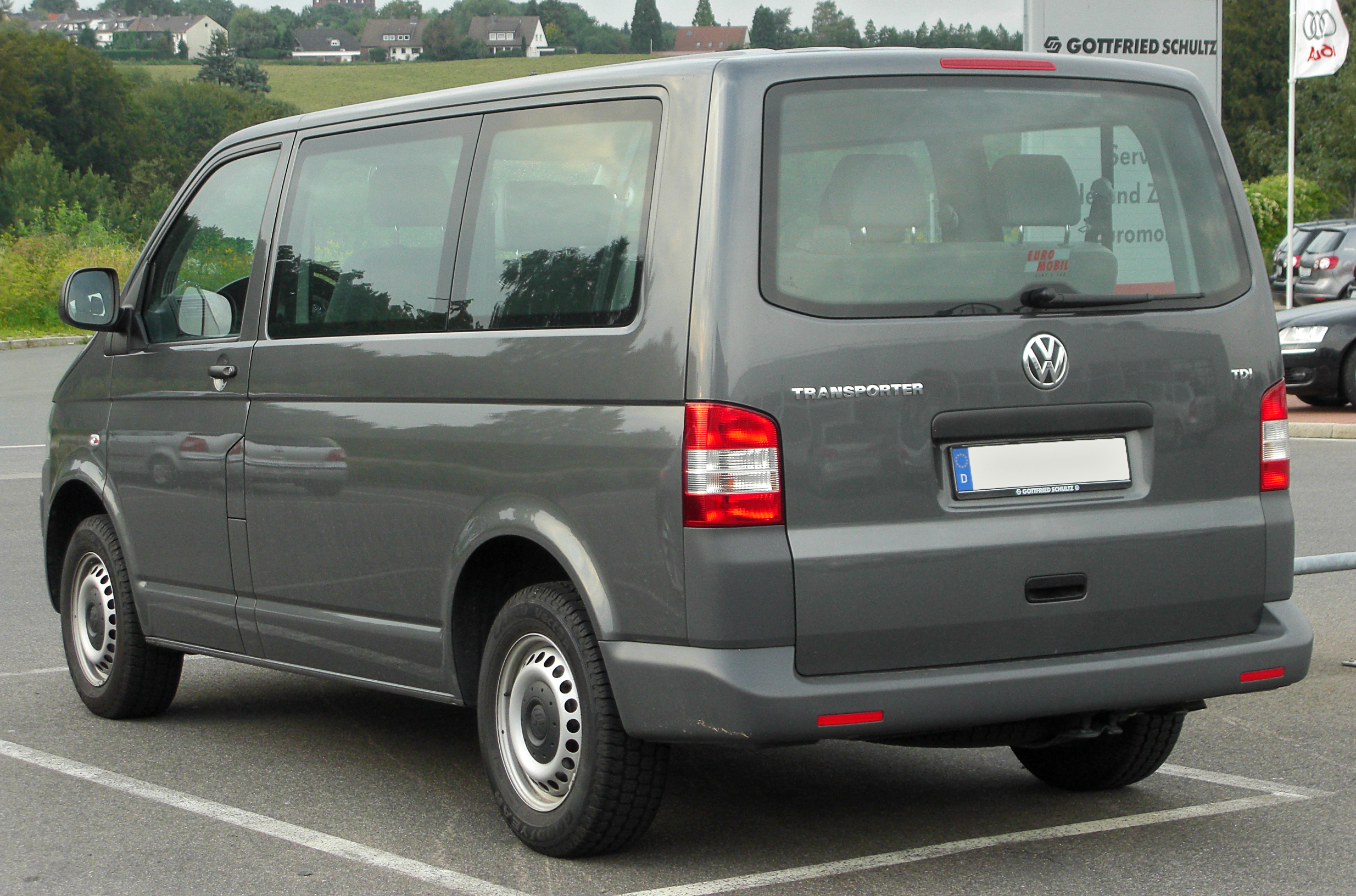
T5 (rear; facelift)

The Transporter T5 range received a facelift in late 2009. Updated powertrain options include common rail diesel engines, and a world-first usage in a light commercial vehicle of a dual clutch transmission – namely Volkswagen Group's 7-speed Direct-Shift Gearbox (DSG).

=== T6 (2016) ===
In 2016, Volkswagen released the T6 Transporter which is based on the T5 Transporter. A refreshed version was first shown in 2019 as the T6.1 Transporter.

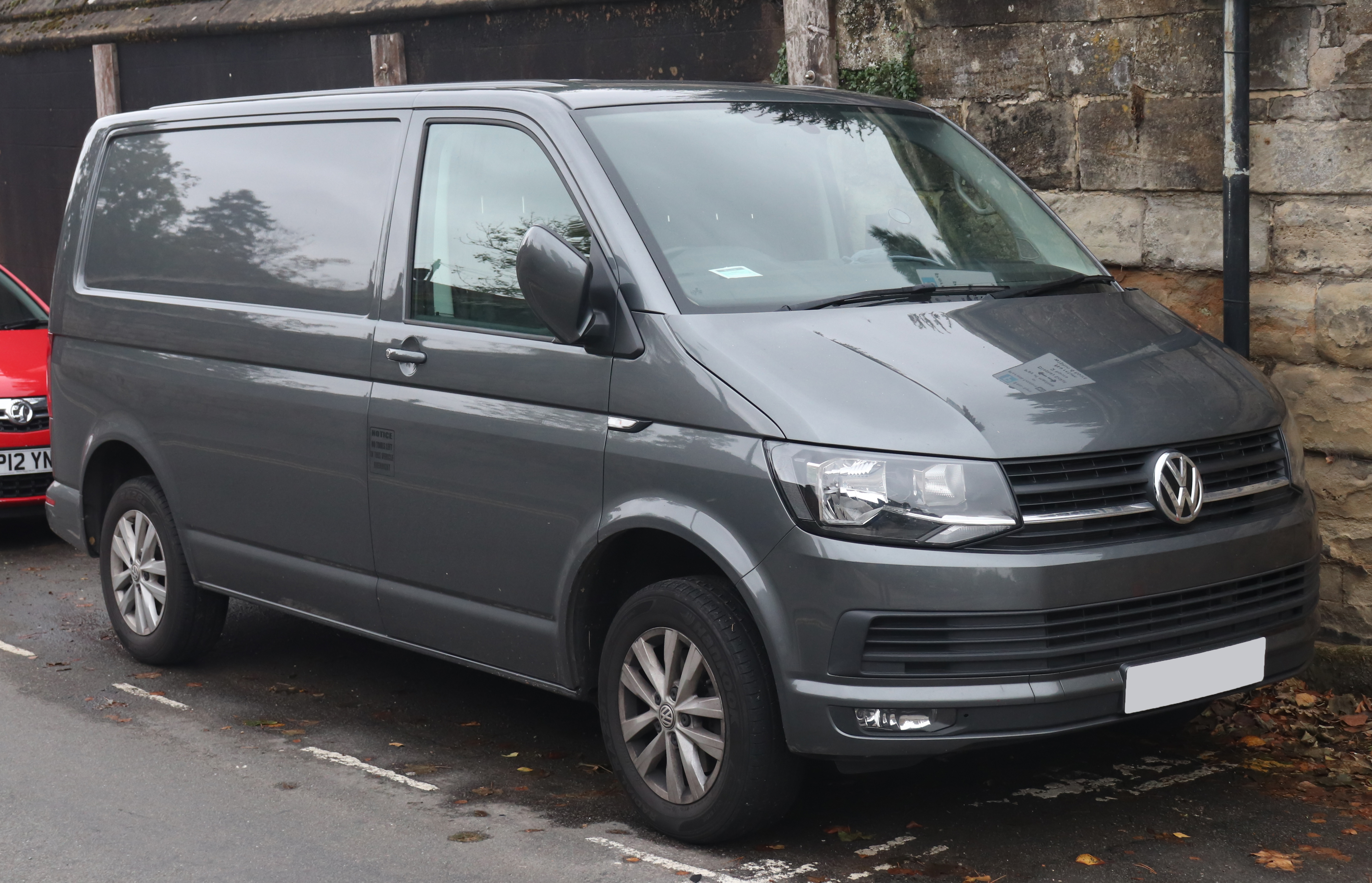
T6 (front; facelift)

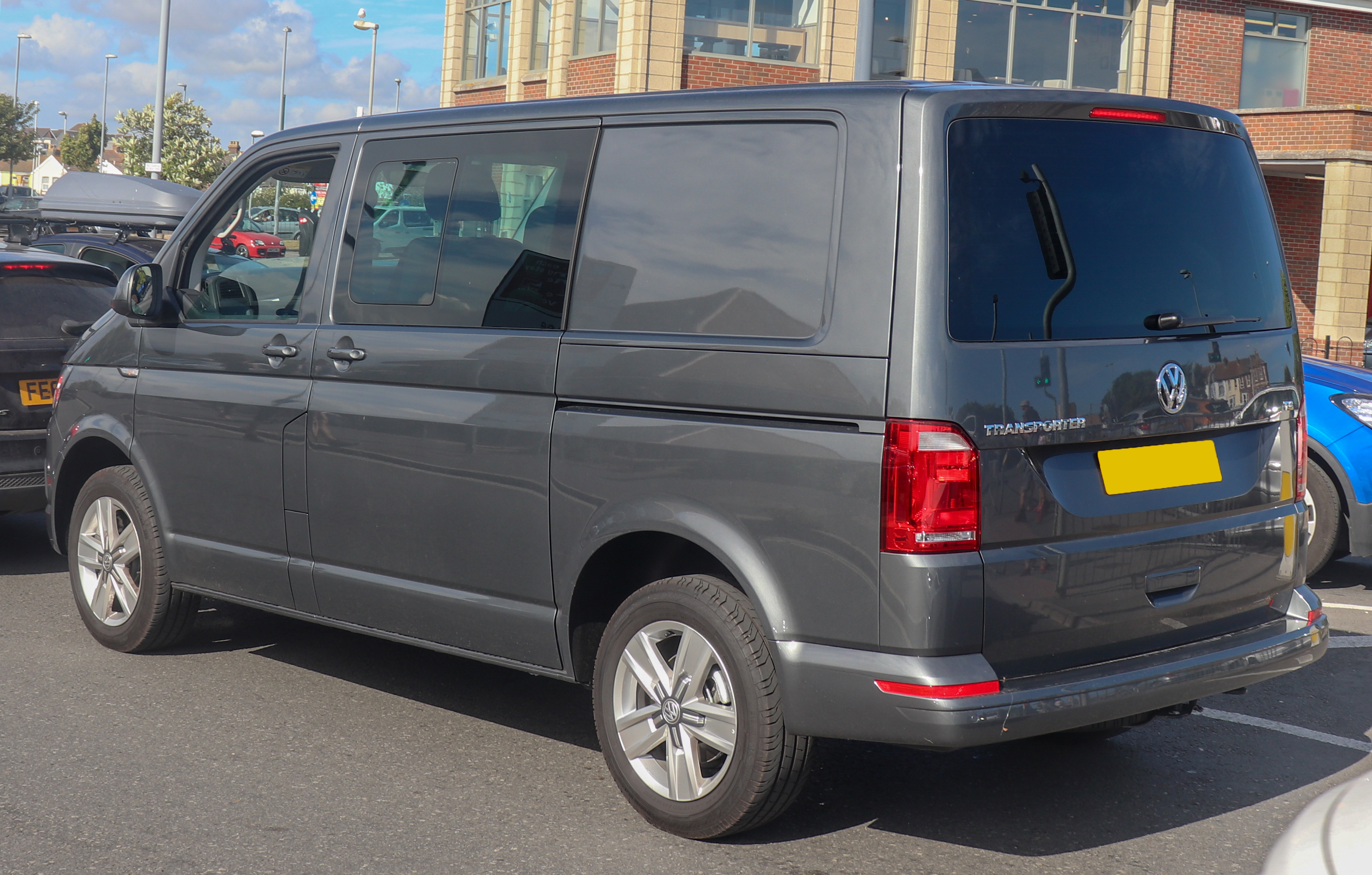
T6 (rear; facelift)

=== T7 ===
==== Multivan (2022) ====
The T7 was released in November 2021 with petrol, diesel and PHEV variants and is only available as a minivan, replacing the Caravelle model for the U.K. market and Multivan in other markets. The T7 Multivan is based on Volkswagen's MQB platform.

The T7 Multivan is not to be confused with the new Volkswagen Transporter panel van and chassis cab models, which will be based on the new 2023 Ford Transit Custom and will be a larger vehicle than the Multivan. The new Transporter shares the vast majority of its body and mechanical components with the Transit, which will be built alongside the new VW Transporter at the Ford Otosan factory in Turkey.

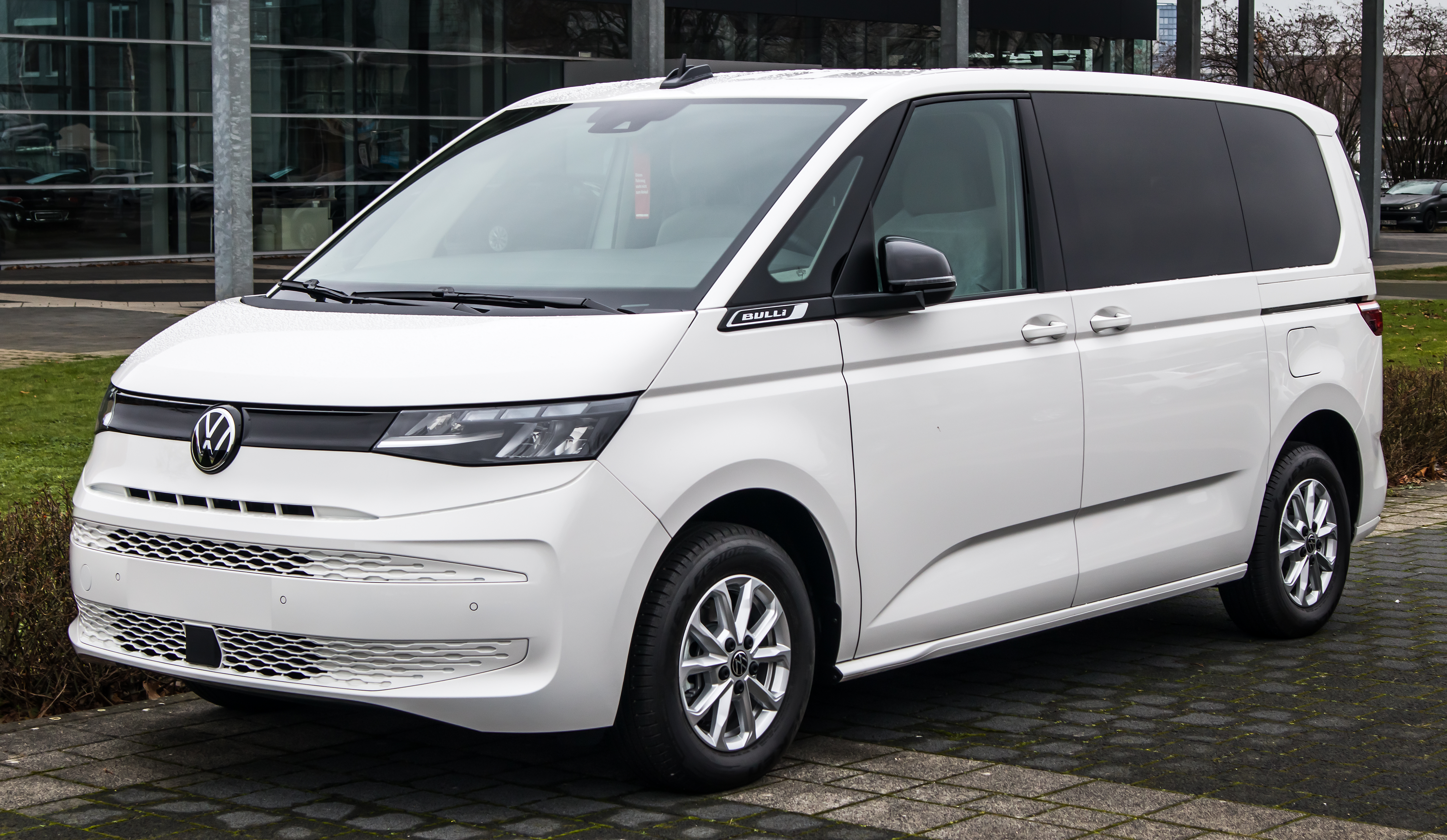
T7 Multivan (front)

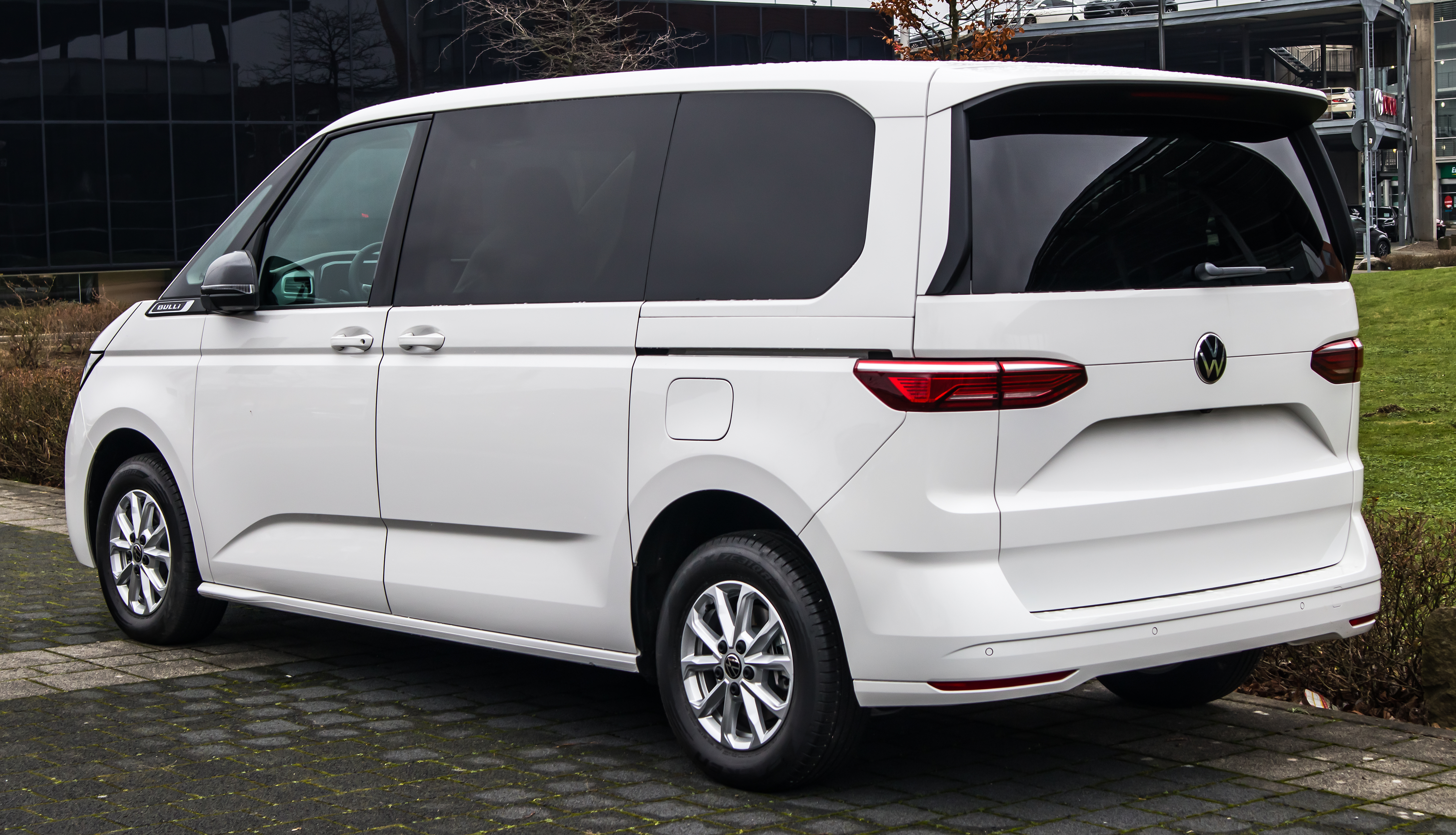
T7 Multivan (rear)

==== Transporter (2024) ====
In December 2023, the 7th Generation Transporter was officially teased with diesel, PHEV and electric powertrains, with a launch scheduled for the second quarter of 2024. Volkswagen have not applied the T7 designation to this model, which is officially known only as 'Transporter'.

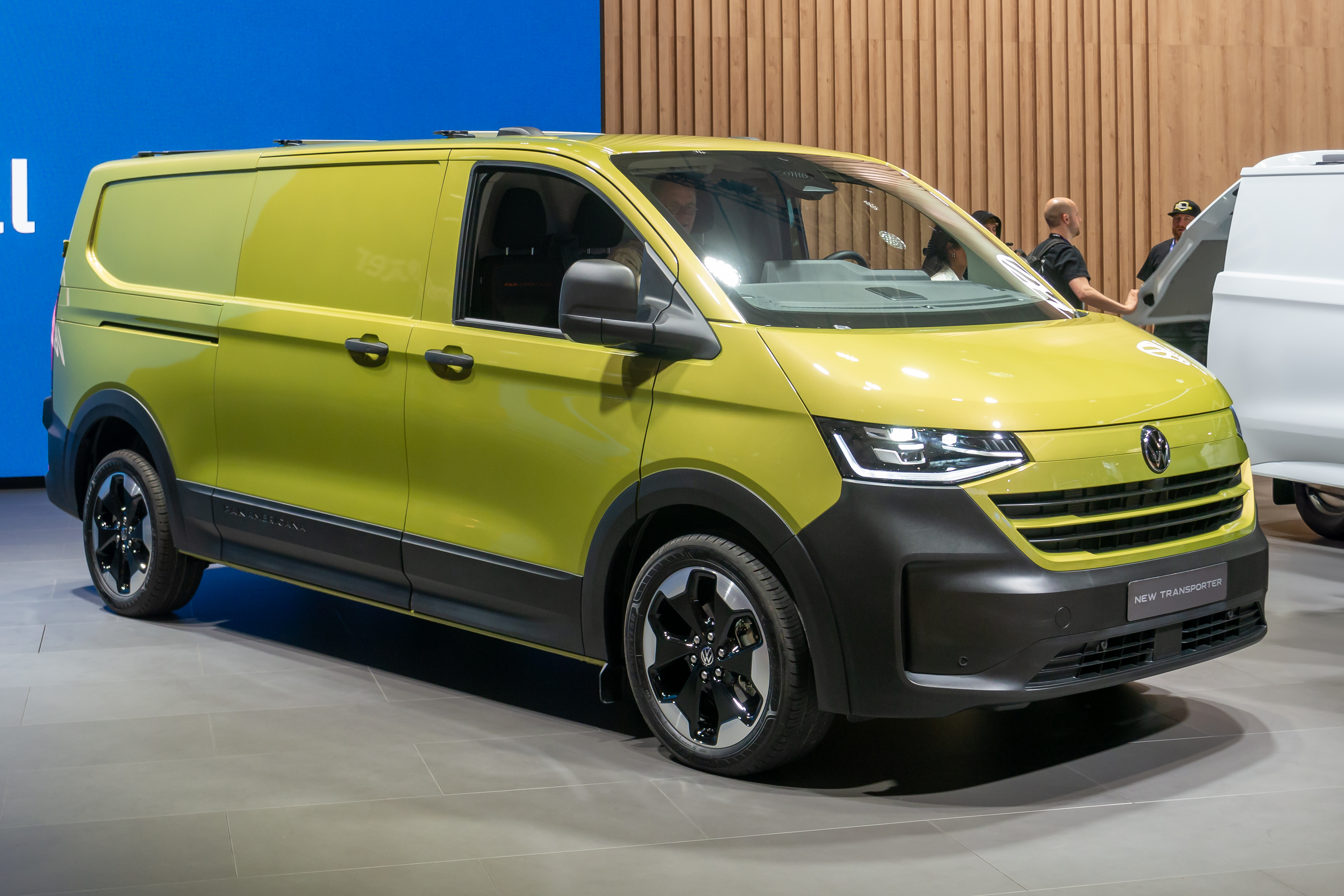
7th Generation Transporter (front)

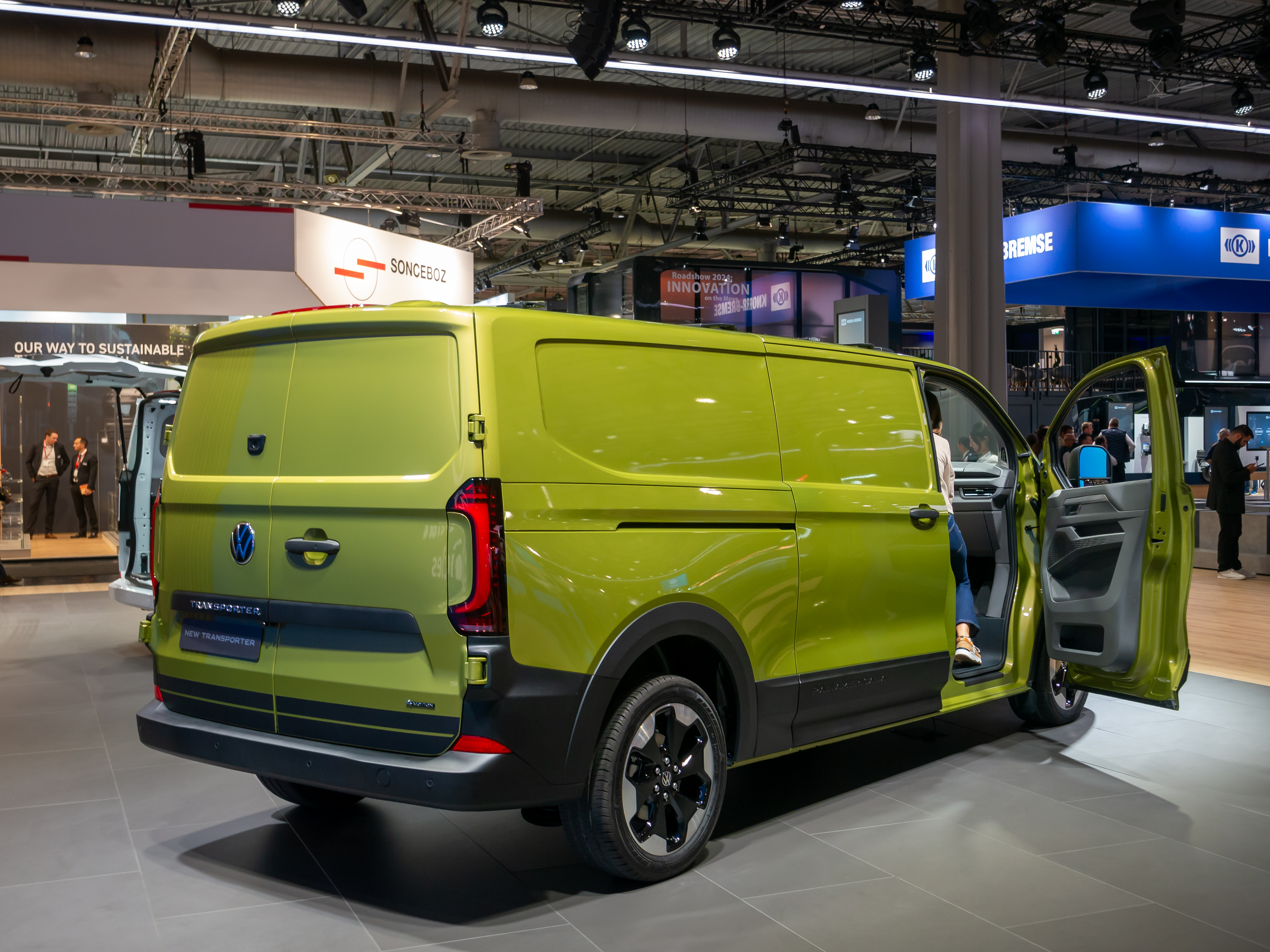
7th Generation Transporter (rear)

== See also ==
- Abt Sportsline
- Chassis cab
