= Guaranteed rental =

A guaranteed rental is a transaction whereby a party looking to acquire a property in order to rent it out on a retail basis (i.e., nightly or weekly), typically a property manager or vacation rental manager, rents from the owner of the property a large block of time, typically several months or even years. Through the transaction the acquirer provides the owner of the property with a guaranteed sum over the term of the contract. The acquirer then has the right to rent the property in question out on a retail basis, keeping all related revenues. This transaction is popular with parties seeking to shift the risk and/or management burden associated with renting property.

Such a transaction is similar to leaseback arrangements more frequently used by property developers.

== Benefits and risks of wholesale rentals ==
=== Property owners ===
Through a wholesale contract a property owner is able to receive a guaranteed sum over the term of the contract. This takes the risk out of trying to rent the property him or herself, often with financial discount. Depending on how the contract is structured, the property owner may also shift more or less of the costs, maintenance, repairs, and other property owner responsibilities to the acquirer during the term of the contract. One potential downside is that by selling the right to rent to a third party, the homeowner loses some control over how that property is managed during the term, though this can also be negotiated and agreed within the contract.

=== Property managers ===
Through a wholesale contract a property manager is able to acquire new inventory to manage on a retail basis, increasing revenues. When acquired at the right price, such contracts can also increase profit margins. By purchasing the weeks during the term, the manager has increased control over how the property is managed. One potential downside is the increased risk of providing a guarantee - if the property does not rent as well as predicted in the retail market, the manager still is obligated to pay the property owner the agreed upon sum.

== Types of guaranteed rental contracts ==
=== Bilateral contracts ===
Wholesale rentals can be negotiated directly between homeowners and property managers. Such contracts can be good where the parties trust one another, and the numbers are easily agreed upon.

=== Marketplaces ===
Property owners and property managers can also come to terms through wholesale rental marketplaces. Through such marketplaces property managers compete against one another, bidding up the price offered and ultimately paid to property owners. By creating a market-derived price for properties’ rental weeks, such marketplaces often make it quick and easy for property owners and property managers to come to agreement and sign wholesale rental contracts.
