= Vacation rental =

Furnished dwelling for short-term stays

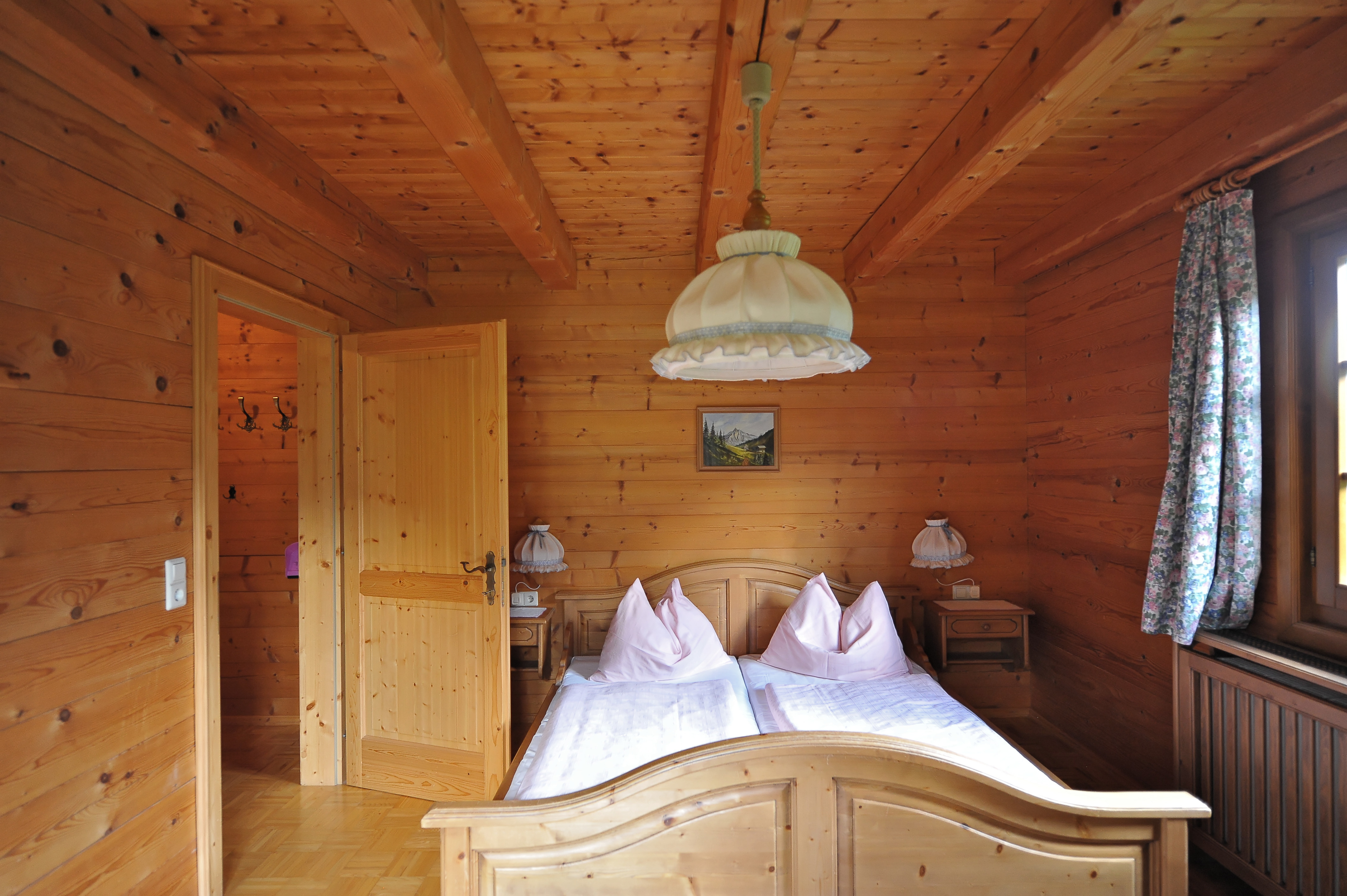
Vacation rental bedroom in Liesing, Austria

A vacation rental is the renting out of a furnished apartment, house, or professionally managed resort-condominium complex on a temporary basis to tourists as an alternative to a hotel. The term vacation rental is mainly used in the US. Other terms used are self-catering rental, holiday home, holiday let (in the United Kingdom), cottage holiday (for a rental of smaller accommodation in rural locations) and gite (in rural locations in France).

Vacation rentals have long been a popular travel option in Europe (especially in the United Kingdom) as well as in Canada and are becoming increasingly popular around the world.

== Types of accommodation ==
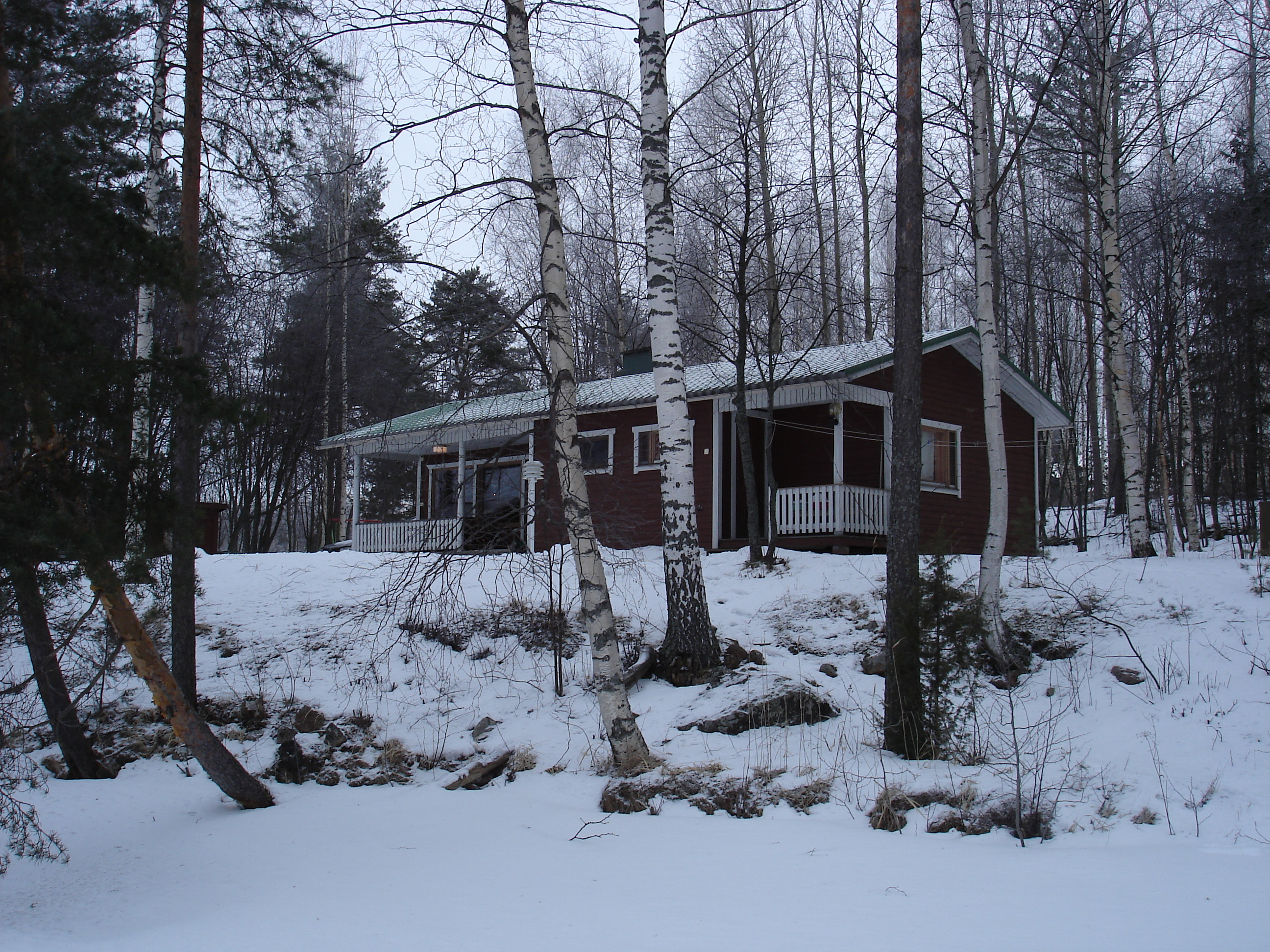
Vacation rental home in Parikkala, Finland

Vacation rentals usually occur in privately owned vacation properties (holiday homes), so the variety of accommodations is broad and inconsistent. The property is a fully furnished property, such as a holiday villa, apartment, cottage, condominium, townhome or single-family-style home. Farm stay can encompass participation on a working farm or a more conventional rental that happens to be co-located on a farm. The client/traveler arranges to rent the vacation rental property for a designated period of time. Some rent on a nightly basis, similar to hotel rooms, although the more prevalent vacation rental industry practice is typically weekly rentals.

Vacation rentals range from budget studio apartments to high-end private villas in popular destinations. Some luxury properties may cost several thousand dollars per night and offer amenities and services comparable to those of luxury hotels, including staff, private beach access, boats, private chefs, and cooking lessons.

Some vacation rentals, particularly condominiums or apartments, offer many of the same services hotels offer to their guests, e.g., front desk check-in, 24-hour maintenance, in-house housekeeping, and concierge service. Many "hospitality, timeshare and premier independent resorts...that until now, access to these resort-condominium complexes was available exclusively through purchase options such as whole, fractional, or timeshare ownership," are now offering daily vacation rentals.

At the other end of the spectrum are campervan and motorhome rentals.

== Locations ==
A row of vacation homes at Big White Ski Resort in Canada

Villa holidays are very popular in Europe, and main destinations include the United States Virgin Islands, Italy, Spain, France, Germany, Greece, and Turkey. In France, they are known as gîtes.

Vacation rentals are available in most states of the US and are prevalent in major tourist areas such as Florida, Hawaii, and California, as well as in other coastal areas with beaches, where they may be referred to as beach houses, many of which are rentals. The vacation rental market is much larger in Europe than in the United States, and Florida is a popular destination for villa holidays for Europeans.

== Comparison with other accommodations ==
Consumers unfamiliar with the concept of a vacation rental property may confuse it with a timeshare property. Many timeshare resorts offer quarter ownership, which provides 13 weeks of use or rental.

A timeshare can still be made available as a vacation rental should an owner decide to put their owned week(s) on a vacation rental program. Also, a large segment of the 21% of unsold and therefore still resort-controlled inventory is made available as vacation rentals. In 2014, this was a $1.9 billion business.

A timeshare is a piece of real estate—often a fully furnished condominium—that is jointly shared by multiple owners. While different types of timeshare ownership exist, in general, each owner bears a portion of the responsibility, along with the right to a segment of time in which he or she is granted sole use of the property. Timeshare resorts allow financially qualified guests to rent and tour their unowned properties and then make those properties available to the guest for purchase. Timeshare owners can also choose to bank their week with an exchange company such as RCI or Interval International or rent the unit.

Traditional hotels generally do not include vacation properties. However, some contemporary resort developments include shared ownership components such as villas and condominiums that can be either rented through the hotel or rented out by their owners either directly or through agencies.

== Vacation rental market size ==
Evercore estimates the global addressable vacation rental market to be $100 billion, with two-thirds of the market "for rent by owner".

== Online, listing services, agencies, and management companies ==
Vacation rentals and villa rentals are arranged either direct with the owner or through an agency, usually via the internet. Many owners have their own websites, but most also use listing services, which display property information and photos provided by the homeowner. Because each property owner has his or her own deposit and payment requirements, cancellation policies, key-pick-up procedures, etc., a guest contacts the property owner directly in order to book.

There are different kinds of listing sites, with different specialisms (for example, destination-specific, luxury, rural, etc.) and features (such as instant booking or loyalty programs).

In November 2015, Expedia bought HomeAway (which also owns VRBO and many other vacation rental brands) to compete with Airbnb. HomeAway and VRBO were combined into a single brand known as Vrbo.

There are also other online vacation rental sites that specialize in metasearch or resort residences. Metasearch plays a role in the rental ecosystem by connecting rentals from different listing companies under a single experience.

In contrast, vacation rental agencies handle reservations and billing on the homeowner's behalf, and there is no direct contact between the guest and the owner. Because the fee or commission charged to an owner by an agency is higher than that charged by a listing service, the rent tends to be higher.

In the United Kingdom, villa holidays are also sold by tour operators as packages, including flights and car hire. This is convenient for guests who prefer not to make their own arrangements, but it may not be cheaper and does not usually allow the guest to choose a specific property.

Most property owners contract a vacation rental management company to manage their vacation rentals. These companies handle housekeeping and property maintenance. Some management companies also act as agencies, marketing the vacation rental property and handling reservations and billing. Most vacation rental management companies work on a commission basis, meaning they do not make a guarantee to the homeowner in terms of weeks that will be rented or revenue earned. Rather, they collect a commission ranging from 20% to 50% of any revenues generated.

An alternative arrangement is where vacation rental managers provide homeowners with a guaranteed rental. Under these arrangements, vacation rental managers buy all of the weeks the homeowner wishes to rent in a single transaction. This provides the homeowner with guaranteed income and puts the risk and management burden on the rental manager.

== Travelers' concerns ==
Some travelers avoid vacation rentals for fear of what industry insiders call SNAD: "Significantly Not As Described." This refers to a property that looks like paradise in the photos, only to reveal leaky roofs and blocked views upon the traveler's arrival. To reduce this risk, many vacation rental companies offer user reviews.

Another significant concern is that people may create false accounts and advertise vacation homes that they do not in fact own. This can lead to unsuspecting customers booking and paying for a vacation, only to find on arrival that the rental does not exist. Given that the accommodation has been booked and paid for many months in advance, the culprit may disappear without a trace, leaving the customer out of pocket.

== Impacts ==
Vacation rentals can provide positive impacts on local economies. Vacation rentals at times allow for longer stays as opposed to hotels, and longer stays increase visitor spending which provides more employment opportunities in local communities. Increases of tourist spending in a vacation rental area helps fuel the economy through the multiplier effect by increasing wages.

Vacation rentals can also negatively affect local communities in a number of ways. While not the major cause of limited affordable housing, vacation rentals negatively affect the long-term housing market in local communities, especially tourism communities. As more short-term rentals increase, the availability of long-term units decreases. However, HBR researchers point out that “owner-occupiers” that rent out rooms or the entire house while they are absent does not affect the long-term rental market. Another implication of short-term vacation rentals is that local communities can be disrupted by guests in unfamiliar neighborhoods. Visitors may be uninformed of the culture, attitudes, and unspoken guidelines of a neighborhood in which they are staying. Loud parties after quiet hours, lack of consideration for residential parking, and cultural interpersonal differences are a few of the primary concerns for residents with nearby vacation rentals.

== Restrictions ==
In many counties, towns, and cities, local authorities attempt to regulate or ban vacation rentals after complaints from local residents or competing lodging businesses. In the U.S. New York City, Chicago and other cities have introduced restrictions on short-term rentals, though regulation is not always strictly enforced. The City of Portland, for example, does not allow rentals of less than 30 days in residential zones but according to local vacation property managers such as Vacasa, the average guest stays 3-10 nights.

San Diego, California has also created similar restrictions. Starting in 2022, the city put a cap on the number of properties that could be used as short-term vacation rentals at 1%. This restriction was approved by the California Coastal Commission and will be available for review in seven years. This restriction will only apply to homes where the owner is not a permanent resident. For example, shared rooms that are available in homes where the owner lives will not be a part of this restriction. The city also requires that those renting out their homes as short-term vacation rentals must pay Transient Occupancy Fees, just as hotels, motels, campgrounds, and RV parks are subject to. This will ensure that public services such as trash collectors and water usage are accommodated for financially. Council president, Jennifer Campbell, has noted that these regulations “...will close the chapter on an unregulated market that has vexed our city, our residents, and our good-faith hosts who wanted a clear set of regulations to follow.”

== See also ==
- Destination club
- Homestay
- Peer-to-peer property rental
- Timeshare
- Companies:
  - Booking.com
  - CanadaStays
  - TripAdvisor
  - Tripping.com
  - Vacatia
