= Wayne Chang =

American businessman (born 1983)

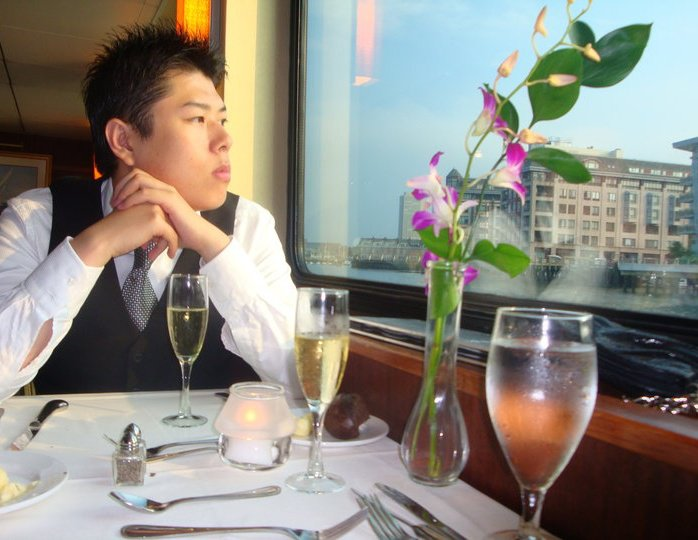
- Born: August 3, 1983 (age 43); Taipei, Taiwan
- Education: University of Massachusetts Amherst (BA)
- Occupations: Entrepreneur; Startup Founder; Angel Investor; Film Producer; Philanthropist
- Years active: 1991–present
- Known for: Startups
- Awards: Honorary PhD; 40 under 40
- Website: www.chang.com

Wayne Chang (born August 3, 1983) is an American entrepreneur, angel investor, film producer, and philanthropist. He is best known for founding Crashlytics, a startup acquired by Twitter in 2013. He is also known for creating a filesharing network called i2hub, AI Company Reasoner and making various seed investments, and his lawsuit against the Winklevoss brothers.

== Early life ==
Chang was born in Taipei, Taiwan, and grew up extremely poor on a farm in rural Taiwan. He immigrated to the United States at age 6, still short of cash. He wrote his first software program on the Apple IIe at age 7. While attending a high school in Haverhill, Massachusetts, he was involved with Napster, the first peer-to-peer filesharing platform. In 2005, Newsweek profiled Chang for his abilities in technology.

== Education ==
Chang attended University of Massachusetts Amherst for his undergraduate degree.

In 2003 and 2004, i2hub, created by Wayne in his UMass dorm, became his primary focus. With rapid growth and competition from Facebook, his business overtook academics.

He dropped out of UMass to develop i2hub and went on to invest in and work for more than 40 internet startups, including DraftKings and JetSmarter.

In 2016, Chang was awarded an honorary doctorate by University of Massachusetts Amherst. He was also the featured Commencement Speaker for the 2016 graduating class.

== Career ==
Chang has been involved in various technology projects and communities from a young age. Using the pseudonym "ttol," he contributed to multiple hacking and software-related efforts during his pre-teen and teenage years. Some of his activities include MyAdvantage for which he developed a hack for AllAdvantage, which gained widespread usage among users of the platform. LanCraft; for which he created modifications for Blizzard's Battle.net platform, some of which remain in use today.

Chang was also active in online communities such as EFNet, AOL Warez, and TetriNET, where he collaborated with other developers and enthusiasts on various software and gaming projects.

=== Reasoner ===
Chang developed Reasoner as an advanced artificial intelligence system. As his third AI company following Digits and Patented.ai, Reasoner addresses critical challenges in AI, particularly the inaccuracy and "hallucinations" associated with large language models (LLMs). Reasoner builds adaptive, knowledge graphs that automatically reconfigure as information changes. Reasoner’s core technology can be described as a neuro-symbolic AI. Chang plans to release Reasoner’s software development kit in Q1 2024, allowing developers to integrate it into their own applications. Chang has identified hallucinations—instances where AI generates inaccurate or fabricated information—and lack of explainability as primary barriers to broader AI adoption. Drawing on lessons from his previous ventures, he emphasized the necessity of dependable and traceable AI results, as Traditional systems, he observed, often fail to meet the standards required in sensitive domains. Reasoner addresses these gaps by ensuring outputs are both accurate and verifiable, crucial for enterprise and scientific applications. Chang envisions Reasoner as a transformative platform for expert applications, solving critical challenges and enabling advancements in science, medicine, and technology.

=== Digits ===
Chang co-founded Digits with previous Crashlytics co-founder Jeff Seibert in 2018. Digits is developing advanced, real-time technology for businesses. In November 2019, Digits announced a $10.5 million Series A from Benchmark and 72 angels including Aaron Levie, Ali Rowghani, Anthony Noto, April Underwood, Brian Lee (entrepreneur), David Cancel, Dick Costolo, Jeff Orlowski, Jordan Fliegel, Justin Kan, Katie Jacobs Stanton, Katrina Lake, Kimber Lockhart, Michelle Dipp, Nat Friedman, and Sean Christie. In April 2020 Digits announced it had raised $22 million Series B from GV and Benchmark. In March 2022, Digits announced the close of its $65 million of Series C funding led by SoftBank with participation from Harry Stebbings' 20VC Growth, as well as GV and Benchmark.

=== Crashlytics ===
Chang co-founded Crashlytics, a mobile company building crash reporting for iOS and Android, with Jeff Seibert in 2011.

In January 2013, Crashlytics was acquired by Twitter; then acquired by Google; now default on Android. Chang also served as Director of Product Strategy for Twitter.

=== i2hub ===
Chang created i2hub in his dorm room at the University of Massachusetts Amherst. He had started it in February 2003 for a month. He then restarted it in March 2004, and ultimately expanded to over 400 universities and colleges both in the United States and abroad.

=== Facebook, ConnectU, and Winklevoss lawsuits ===
On December 21, 2009, Chang and The i2hub Organization launched a lawsuit against ConnectU and its founders, seeking 50% of the settlement. The complaint says, "The Winklevosses and Howard Winklevoss filed [a] patent application, U.S. Patent Application No. 20060212395, on or around March 15, 2005, but did not list Chang as a co-inventor." It also states, "Through this litigation, Chang asserts his ownership interest in The Winklevoss Chang Group and ConnectU, including the settlement proceeds." Lee Gesmer of the firm Gesmer Updegrove posted the detailed 33-page complaint online.

On May 13, 2011, it was reported that Judge Peter Lauriat made a ruling against the Winklevosses. The Winklevosses had argued that the court lacks jurisdiction because the settlement with Facebook has not been distributed and therefore Chang hasn't suffered any injury. Chang alleges that he has received nothing in return for the substantial benefits he provided to ConnectU, including the value of his work, as well as i2hub's users and goodwill." Lauriat also wrote that, although Chang's claims to the settlement are "too speculative to confer standing, his claims with respect to an ownership in ConnectU are not. They constitute an injury separate and distinct from his possible share of the settlement proceeds. The court concludes that Chang has pled sufficient facts to confer standing with respect to his claims against the Winklevoss defendants." A settlement was reached where Facebook acquired ConnectU for 1,253,326 shares of Facebook stock and an additional $20 million in cash.

=== Fabric ===
At Fabric, Chang co-founded and developed a mobile development platform that included a modular, cross-platform development suite with unified SDKs for iOS, Android, JavaScript, and C++. Within two years, the platform scaled to 2 billion active devices and served 225,000 developers.

== Films ==
=== Wicked Magic Productions ===
In 2017, Wayne Chang teamed up with Paul English (co-founder of Kayak, which was sold to Priceline for ~$2 billion) to start Wicked Magic Productions. Their first movie together was Dear Dictator, a film starring Katie Holmes, Michael Caine, Jason Biggs, Seth Green and Odeya Rush.

=== Chasing Coral ===
Chang is also an Associate Producer for award-winning climate change documentary Chasing Coral, which won an award at Sundance Film Festival in 2017. Netflix announced it had acquired the film at the festival and it is now a Netflix Original. It debuted on Netflix in July 2017. Movie review site Rotten Tomatoes gives it a 100% rating.

=== Frame by Frame ===
Prior to Chasing Coral, Chang is also an Associate Producer for award-winning documentary Frame by Frame. It premiered at SXSW in 2015 and subsequently went on to win many awards. The Hollywood Reporter called Frame by Frame "a work of profound immediacy, in sync with the photographers' commitment and hope" and BBC Culture proclaimed "the film features photographers passionate about telling stories of the true identity of Afghanistan – whether they are newsworthy or not." In 2016, Time, Inc acquired the documentary. It has a 92% rating on Rotten Tomatoes.

== Views and opinions ==
Chang’s public commentary centers on themes of entrepreneurship, technological adaptation, and innovation.

He advocates a proactive approach to career advancement, encouraging students and early-career professionals to actively seek opportunities and engage directly with potential employers, collaborators, and investors.

A recurring theme in Chang’s commentary is the evolving role of technology in shaping industries and career pathways. He has highlighted the growing significance of emerging technologies, particularly artificial intelligence and digital platforms, as transformative forces in business and society. In this context, he promotes the integration of practical technological skills into education and workforce training, arguing that familiarity with such tools is increasingly essential rather than optional.

Chang has also articulated perspectives on the relationship between innovation and creative expression. Drawing on his experience in film production and media, he has noted that the success of products and ventures often depends not only on technical functionality but also on their ability to resonate with audiences.

=== Views on Artificial Intelligence ===
Wayne Chang’s perspective on artificial intelligence centers on reliability, explainability, and practical utility, particularly in high-stakes applications.

A key theme in his commentary is skepticism toward the limitations of current large language models (LLMs). Chang has identified issues such as “hallucinations” (inaccurate or fabricated outputs) and lack of transparency as major barriers to enterprise adoption of AI systems. Chang advocates for neurosymbolic AI approaches, which combine neural networks with symbolic reasoning systems. He argues that integrating structured logic and rule-based systems with machine learning enables AI to produce more accurate and explainable results, improving trust and usability in real-world applications.

== Awards ==
- 40 under 40 by Boston Business Journal.
- Most Eligible Bachelor by The Improper Bostonian.
- Honorary doctorate (PhD) from the University of Massachusetts Amherst.
- Commencement Speaker for the Graduating Class of 2016 for the University of Massachusetts Amherst.
- Named one of 30 Most Disruptive People in Tech by Boston Magazine.
- Nominated Entrepreneur of the Year in 2013 by New England Venture Capital Association.
- Nominated Angel of the Year in 2015 and in 2016 by New England Venture Capital Association.
