= Jeff Seibert =

American entrepreneur and angel investor

- Born: July 27, 1985 (age 41); Baltimore, Maryland, United States
- Education: Stanford University
- Occupations: Entrepreneur, Startup Founder, Angel Investor
- Known for: Founding a number of startups
- Website: www.jeffseibert.com

Jeff Seibert (born July 27, 1985) is an American entrepreneur and angel investor. He is best known for co-founding Crashlytics, which in a little over a year was acquired by Twitter for over $100 million in 2013 (later valued at $259.5 million at Twitter's IPO), and co-founding Increo, which was acquired by Box in 2009. In 2020, Seibert starred in the American docudrama film The Social Dilemma.

== Early life ==
Seibert grew up in Baltimore, Maryland. He discovered technology at a young age. He taught himself C in 6th grade and went on to write a range of Macintosh shareware applications. At the age of 13, Jeff released his first application, Histogram, a specialized graphing program for Mac OS. During high school in 2002, Seibert went on to release EVONE, a graphical editor for the computer game Escape Velocity by Ambrosia Software.

== Education ==
Seibert attended Gilman School in Baltimore, graduating in 2004.

Seibert enrolled as an undergraduate degree student at Stanford University. He majored in Computer Science. At Stanford, Jeff was a Vice President of BASES where he led the Entrepreneurial Thought Leaders series from 2005 to 2008. In 2007, Seibert was selected as a Mayfield Fellow where he studied under Tom Byers and Tina Seelig. Seibert received a B.S. in Computer Science from Stanford University in 2008.

== Career ==
Seibert has been deeply involved in technology since he was young. While at Stanford University, he worked for Apple as a campus representative.

In 2007, Seibert co-founded Increo with Kimber Lockhart. Two years later, in 2009, Box acquired Increo and Jeff led Box's east coast presence.

In 2011, Seibert co-founded Crashlytics with Wayne Chang. In about a year, Twitter acquired Crashlytics for over $100 million (later valued at $259.5 million at Twitter's IPO).

In 2014, Seibert led the team that created Fabric, Twitter's mobile developer platform. It launched in October 2014 and as of 2016 is used by over 225,000 developers and installed on over 2 Billion mobile devices.

In September 2015, Twitter announced that it promoted Seibert to oversee Twitter's core product, a role he held for nine months. On January 18, 2017, Seibert announced Fabric's sale to Google and his plans to step back from his role on the Fabric team.

In 2018, Seibert co-founded Digits with Crashlytics co-founder Wayne Chang. In November, 2019 Digits announced it had raised a $10.5 million Series A from Benchmark and 72 angel investors including Aaron Levie, Ali Rowghani, Anthony Noto, April Underwood, Brian Lee (entrepreneur), David Cancel, Dick Costolo, Jeff Orlowski, Jordan Fliegel, Justin Kan, Katie Jacobs Stanton, Katrina Lake, Kimber Lockhart, Michelle Dipp, Nat Friedman, and Sean Christie. 5 months later, in April, 2020, Seibert and Chang announced Digits had raised a $22 million Series B from GV and Benchmark.
