= Baseline Ventures =

American venture capital investment firm

- Type: Private
- Industry: Venture Capital
- Founded: 2006; 20 years ago
- Founder: Steve Anderson
- Headquarters: Jackson, Wyoming, United States
- Area served: Worldwide
- Products: Venture capital
- Website: baselinev.com

Baseline Ventures is a venture capital investment firm that focuses on seed and growth-stage investments in technology companies. The company was the first seed investor in Instagram, an early investor of Twitter and has been called "one of Silicon Valley's most successful — and smallest — investment firms" by Forbes. It is headquartered in Jackson, Wyoming.

The company's founder and Managing Partner, Steve Anderson, was recognized on Fortune's 2012 list of "50 Businesspeople of the Year" and included on the Forbes Midas List from 2012 to 2020.

== History ==
Anderson founded Baseline in 2006. He previously worked for Kleiner Perkins Caufield & Byers, Microsoft, eBay and Starbucks. Anderson has a Master of Business Administration from Stanford University and has invested in companies founded by Stanford alumni including Kevin Systrom and Mike Krieger of Instagram; Katrina Lake of Stitch Fix; and Jeff Seibert of Crashlytics.

== Acquisitions and investments ==
Baseline Ventures has invested in software and web companies that include Instagram, Weebly, OMGPop, ExactTarget and Heroku. Instagram was acquired by Facebook for $1 billion in 2012. Later that year, Baseline-backed OMGPop was acquired by Zynga for approximately $200 million. Salesforce.com acquired Heroku for $212 million in 2010.

- Instagram (acquired by Facebook)
- Parakey (acquired by Facebook)
- Heroku (acquired by Salesforce.com)
- ExactTarget (acquired by Salesforce.com)
- GoInstant (acquired by Salesforce.com)
- CoTweet (acquired by ExactTarget and later Salesforce.com)
- Smyte (acquired by Twitter)
- Crashlytics (acquired by Twitter)
- TellApart (acquired by Twitter)
- GeoAPI (acquired by Twitter)
- Pocket (acquired by Mozilla)
- Iron.io (acquired by Xenon Ventures)
- Soma (acquired by Full Circle)
- Trialpay (acquired by Visa)
- Datalot (acquired by Lightyear Capital)
- Appuri (acquired by DocuSign)
- Apiary (acquired by Oracle)
- Bloc (acquired by Thinkful)
- Stackmob (acquired by PayPal)
- Aardvark (acquired by Google)
- LaunchKit (acquired by Google)
- DocVerse (acquired by Google)
- YardBarker (acquired by Fox Sports)
- Kanjoya (acquired by Ultimate Software)
- Librato (acquired by SolarWinds)
- Blekko (acquired by IBM)
- Indextank (acquired by LinkedIn)
- Rupture (acquired by Electronic Arts)
- Sendori (acquired by Ask.com)
- Versely (acquired by Cisco)
- OMGPop (acquired by Zynga)
- Xobni (acquired by Yahoo!)
- Careport (acquired by Allscripts)
- Metaresolver (acquired by Millennial Media)
- TaskRabbit (acquired by IKEA)
- Weebly (acquired by Square)
- BookFresh (acquired by Sugar Media)
- Cake Financial (acquired by E*Trade)
- ScanScout (acquired by Tremor Media)
- StaxNetworks (acquired by CloudBees)
- Hunch (acquired by eBay)
- Instructables (acquired by Autodesk)
- Flowtown (acquired by DemandForce)
- TastemakerX (acquired by Rdio)
- Citrus Lane (acquired by Care.com)
