= Future Cinema =

Future Cinema is a London-based events company specialising in the creation of immersive and social cinema experiences as an alternative to the multiplex.

== Background ==
Future Cinema stages large cinema screenings that incorporate aspects of immersive events. Founder Fabien Riggall, describes the idea behind Future Cinema as, "creating an immersive experience in which the audience becomes part of the narrative. It's about creating a social cinema experience where the audience can connect with each other online and at the event."

== Subsidiaries ==
=== Secret Cinema ===
In 2007, Secret Cinema pioneered the form ‘Live Cinema’ by introducing site-specific, immersive experiences based on the settings and actions of popular movies, using actors, sets and narratives that complement the particular film. The first event was a screening of Gus Van Sant's classic Paranoid Park which screened at Southwark Playhouse in London. Recent screenings include The Third Man in 2011, Prometheus (film) in 2012 and Terry Gilliam's Brazil (1985 film) in 2013. Making use of abandoned or disused buildings, Secret Cinema explores narratives as well as space in its productions.

=== Future Shorts ===
Future Shorts is a short film label founded in 2003 for new filmmakers to showcase their work.

=== The Other Cinema ===
The Other Cinema is a global network of pop-up cinemas that aims to bring back a sense of community and a social experience to cinema-going. For its launch, The Other Cinema screened David Lean's Brief Encounter on Valentine's Day 2012 at The Troxy in the East End of London. Audiences were encouraged to dress in black-tie and to carry a flower for a lover or a stranger.

=== Secret Screenings ===
Secret Screenings was a UK film club aimed at combining unseen films with a live experience for one night only. The identity of the film remained a secret until the time of showing. In July 2012 Secret Screenings showed Searching for Sugarman followed by a performance by the subject of the film, Sixto Rodriguez.

=== Secret Restaurant ===
Secret Restaurant was launched London in 2012 in conjunction with St John, a Michelin Star restaurant, for Secret Cinema's run of The Third Man. Initially unaware of what film the immersive experience was based upon, diners ate in a themed environment alongside role-playing actors before viewing a screening of the film.
