= Mercer Island High School =

American public high school

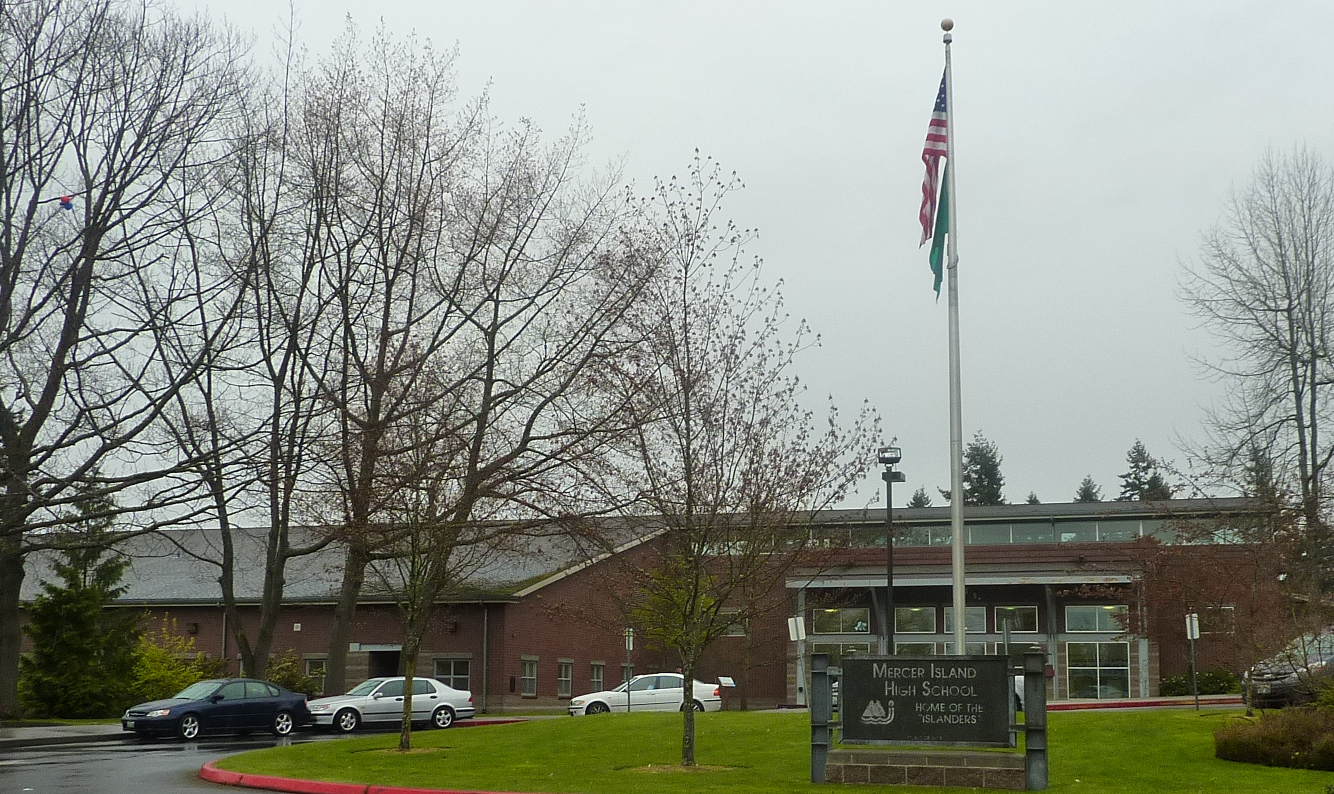

Location
- 9100 SE 43rd Street; Mercer Island, Washington 98040; United States; 47°34′19″N 122°13′07″W

Information
- Type: Public
- Established: 1955
- NCES School ID: 5304980
- Principal: Nick Wold
- Teaching staff: 75.63 FTEs
- Grades: 9–12
- Enrollment: 1,465 (as of 2023–2024)
- Student to teacher ratio: 19.63
- Campus: Suburban
- Colors: Maroon & White
- Mascot: Herbert the Snail
- Nickname: Islanders
- Team name: Islanders
- Newspaper: mihsislander.org
- Affiliation: Mercer Island School District
- Website: mihs.mercerislandschools.org

Mercer Island High School (MIHS) is a public high school located in Mercer Island, Washington, United States, as part of the Mercer Island School District.

As of the 2022–23 school year, the school had an enrollment of 1,524 students and 74.51 classroom teachers (on an FTE basis), for a student–teacher ratio of 20.45. There were 68 students eligible for free lunch and 31 eligible for reduced-cost lunch.

MIHS adopted a cell-phone free policy in the 2024-25 school year. In the 2025-26 school year the policy was expanded to include personal laptops and tablets.

In 2025, reporting by InvestigateWest and statements from King County prosecutors brought renewed attention to past allegations of sexual misconduct involving two former teachers at Mercer Island High School. The coverage also examined the district’s handling of those cases and its internal review processes (see Sexual misconduct allegations).

== Awards and recognition ==
During the 2006-07 school year, Mercer Island High School was recognized with the Blue Ribbon School Award of Excellence by the United States Department of Education.

== Music program ==
The school's marching band has traveled to play at national and international events. It participated in the 104th annual Rose Parade in Pasadena, California, in 1993; the 117th edition in 2006; the 123rd edition in 2012; and the 130th edition in 2019.

In 2011, the band traveled internationally to participate in the 2011 London, England New Year's Day Parade & Festival upon royal invitation. In 2014, the marching band participated in the 116th Victoria Day parade in Victoria, British Columbia; they returned in 2017 for the 119th Victoria Day parade. In 2015, members of the marching and concert bands traveled to Australia as part of a tour including participation in the Australian National Band Championships.

The Mercer Island High School marching band has also performed during the halftimes of several Seattle Seahawks football games at Lumen Field. They performed at the Ring of Honor induction for long-time team owner Paul Allen in 2019. In November 2023, the band participated in the 97th Annual Macy's Thanksgiving Parade.

== Athletics ==
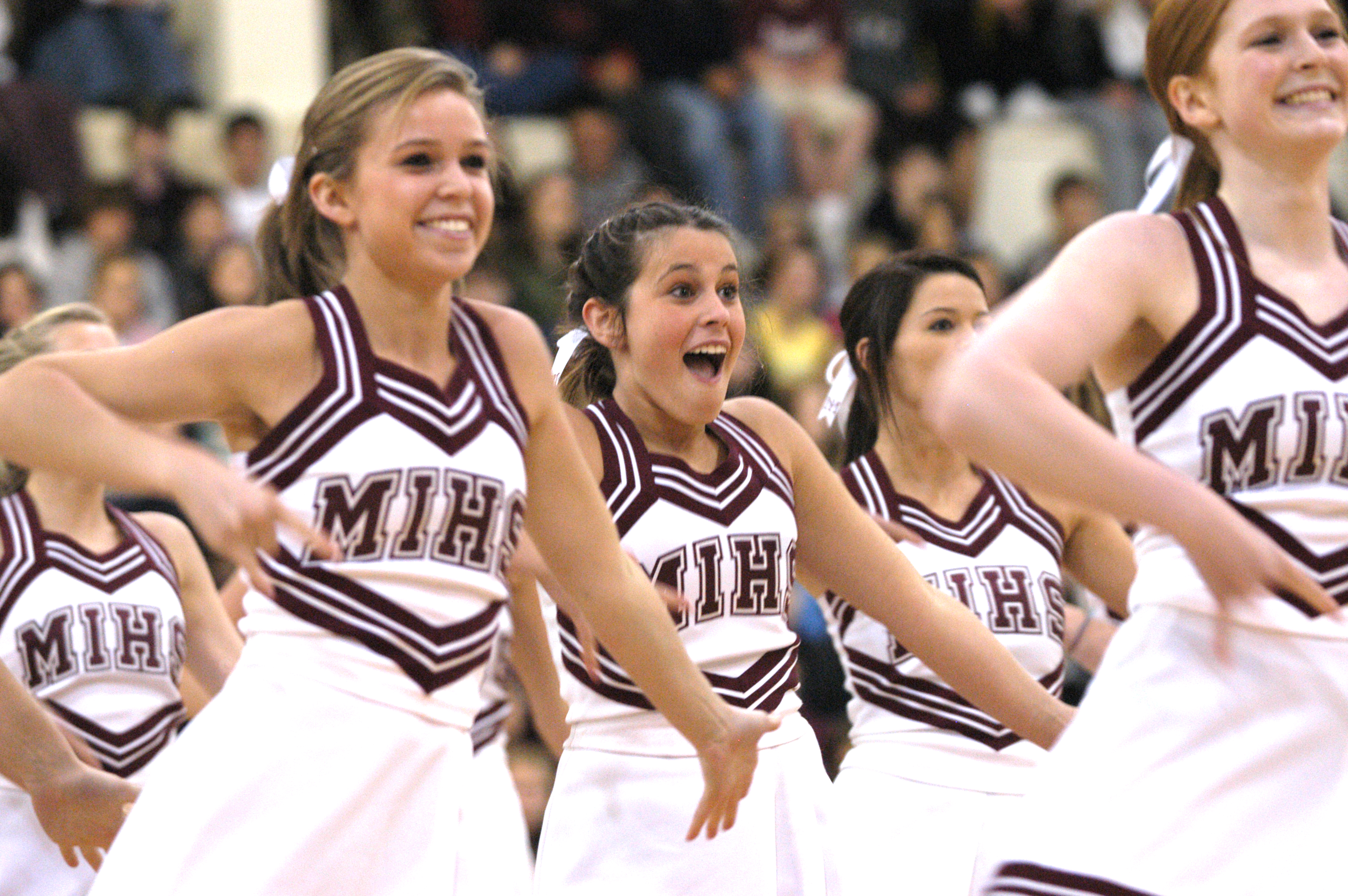
The varsity cheerleading squad in December 2005

Mercer Island High School was honored by the Washington Interscholastic Activities Association as the 3A Wells Fargo Scholastic Cup Champion for the 2005-06 school year, based on State championship victories in boys' track and field, boys' golf, boys' swimming and diving and boys' tennis.

The boys lacrosse team was WHSBLA Division II state champion in 1996 (defeating Vashon High School in the tournament final) and won the Division I title in 2001 (vs. Bainbridge High School), 2004 (vs. Bainbridge), 2005 (vs. Issaquah High School), 2006 (vs. Issaquah), 2011 (vs. Bainbridge) and 2015 (vs. Bellevue High School)

Girls' Swim and Dive had an undefeated season in 2009 ending it by winning the State Championship. Boys' Swim and Dive also went undefeated in the 2009-2010 season, and went on to win their fifth consecutive State title.

The girls' and boys' tennis teams have won a combined 41 State championships since 1972. The girls tennis team has won 25 state titles and has been inducted into the Washington Interscholastic Activities Association Hall of Fame.

The basketball team, formerly coached by all-time Washington state wins leader Ed Pepple, recorded its first losing season in 38 years in 2006.

In 1981 Mercer Island Basketball Team lost the AAA State basketball final game to Shadle Park in a controversial decision. At 64-65 to Mercer Island, a last-second shot by Shadle Park "depending on who you are listening to, either clearly did or clearly didn’t beat the air horn."

Boys' swimming was rated first in its class by the 2006-07 NISCA National Dual Meet Team Rankings.

In the 2024/2025 season, on Saturday, November 9, 2025, at Sun Willows Golf Course in Pasco, Washington, the Mercer Island Cross Country Team won both the Girls XC AAA State Championship and the Boys XC AAA State Championship. The girls were led by the Rodriguez sisters. The sophomore Sophia and the senior Victoria who were invaluable to the team's success. Senior Owen Powell, junior Bodie Thomas, and sophomore Mathew Strong were the dynamic trio who propelled the boys to victory. Particularly Owen Powell who became the first high school athlete from Washington State to run a sub-4-minute mile. He clocked a time of 3:57.74 at the University of Washington Husky Classic, breaking the previous state high school record of 4:01.50 set by Olympian Gerry Lindgren in 1964. This happened after cross country season on February 21, 2025 at an indoor track.

In the 2024/2025 season, on Saturday, May 24, 2025, at Starfire Stadium in Tukwila, Washington, the Mercer Island Boys Lacrosse team clinched the 3A title with an 11–8 victory over Bellevue High School. This win was particularly significant as Mercer Island avenged its only loss of the season, which had come against Bellevue.

Since 2011, the unofficial school mascot has been a maroon-and-white snail named Herbert. The “tropical warrior” Islander mascot of the ‘70s was deemed to be offensive and has not been used since.

== Sexual misconduct allegations ==
In 2025, InvestigateWest published reports describing past allegations of sexual misconduct by two teachers at Mercer Island High School (MIHS) and the district’s handling of those cases.

According to the reporting, King County prosecutors stated that they found credible evidence that teacher Gary “Chris” Twombley had engaged in sexual contact with a student in 2015 but did not file charges because the statute of limitations had expired. The articles also stated that internal district records indicated the district did not make the allegations public or conduct a full investigation at the time.

A separate report detailed allegations against teacher Curtis Johnston, who a former student said had a sexual relationship that began while she was a senior and continued after graduation. Documents cited in the article described the district’s 2011 internal review as limited in scope and focused on personnel and legal considerations rather than a formal investigation.

The district has not disputed the existence of the prior internal reviews but has stated that no evidence available at the time supported disciplinary action. Publication of the 2025 articles prompted renewed public discussion about the district’s procedures for responding to misconduct allegations.

== Notable alumni ==
- Bill Anschell ('77), jazz pianist and composer.
- Mark Bathum ('77), Paralympic alpine skier who has competed at two Winter Paralympics, two World Cups and two World Championships.
- Daniel Bonjour ('99), actor, director, writer.
- Matt Boyd (born 1991), professional baseball pitcher for the Chicago Cubs.
- Steve Bunin ('92), ESPN commentator
- Travis DeCuire (born 1970), basketball head coach, University of Montana.
- Stanley Ann Dunham ('60), mother of former U.S. President Barack Obama
- Jean Enersen (born 1944), journalist who worked for 48 years at KING-TV in Seattle.
- Josh Fisher ('00), former professional basketball player
- Caroline Fraser ('79), writer who won the 2018 Pulitzer Prize for Biography or Autobiography.
- Pétur Guðmundsson (born 1958), Icelandic former professional basketball player and coach who was the first Icelander ever to play in the NBA.
- Alex Goyette ('07), film writer, director.
- Adrian Hanauer (born 1966), owner of Pacific Coast Feather Co., majority owner and general manager of Seattle Sounders FC.
- Bill Hanson (born c. 1940), retired professional basketball player who played for Real Madrid Baloncesto.
- Steve Hawes ('68), played ten seasons (1974–84) in NBA for Houston Rockets, Portland Trail Blazers, Atlanta Hawks, and Seattle SuperSonics
- Brad Idzik ('10), offensive coordinator for the Carolina Panthers.
- Mark Jerue ('78), former linebacker for the New York Jets and the Los Angeles Rams
- David Kirtman ('01), fullback for New Orleans Saints
- Aaron Levie ('03), co-founder of Box.net
- Matt Logie ('99), college basketball coach
- Ben Mahdavi ('98), former NFL linebacker and long snapper.
- Kevin Martin (American musician) ('87), lead vocalist of Candlebox
- Joel McHale ('91), actor, Jeff Winger in NBC's Community, host of E! Entertainment Television's The Soup.
- Jordan Morris ('13), player for United States men's national soccer team and Seattle Sounders FC.
- Annie Parisse ('93), actress who has been featured on Law & Order and As the World Turns
- Steve Penny (born 1964), businessman and sports administrator who was President and CEO of USA Gymnastics from 2005 to 2017.
- Owen Pochman ('95), football player for New York Giants and San Francisco 49ers
- Nancy Ramey (born 1940), competition swimmer who represented the United States at the 1956 Summer Olympics in Melbourne, Australia, where she won a silver medal in the 100 meter butterfly.
- Anne Rosellini, film producer
- Ethan Sandler ('91), writer and actor.
- Dylan Smith ('03), co-founder of Box.net
- Quin Snyder ('85), head coach of NBA's Utah Jazz
- Gordon Sondland ('75), U.S. Ambassador to the European Union
- Darby Stanchfield, actress
- Vauhini Vara, (‘00) author and journalist
- Dave Wainhouse, ('85) former MLB player (Montreal Expos, Seattle Mariners, Pittsburgh Pirates, Colorado Rockies, St. Louis Cardinals)
- Mary Wayte, ('83) Olympic gold medalist in 200m freestyle in 1984.
- Sean White ('99), MLB pitcher for Seattle Mariners.
- Peter Daniel Young ('95), animal rights activist.

== Notable faculty ==
- Gillian d'Hondt (born 1982), women's basketball coach, professional European women's basketball player.
- Sheryl Swoopes (born 1971), former professional basketball player, who was the first player to be signed in the WNBA.
