= Gametime =

Mobile ticket marketplace app

Gametime United Inc.
- Type: Private
- Industry: Ticket exchange; Ticket resale
- Founded: 2012; 14 years ago
- Founder: Brad Griffith
- Headquarters: San Francisco, California, US
- Area served: United States; Canada
- Website: gametime.co

Gametime is a mobile ticket marketplace app developed by San Francisco-based Gametime United Inc., which was founded by Brad Griffith in late 2012. The app was released for iOS in May 2013, with an Android version released in March 2014. In multiple funding rounds following the app's initial release, Gametime has raised a total of US$71.5 million from various investors. The app received an award from each SportsBusiness Daily and the Appy Awards in 2017, and Gametime United was named among the fastest-growing companies in the U.S. in various categories by Deloitte, Inc. and Accel Partners.

== Features ==
Gametime allows users to purchase tickets for sports events, including MLB, NFL, NCAA, NBA, NHL and MLS games and WrestleMania, AMA Supercross Championship and PGA Tour events, as well as music events, such as concerts, and other performances, including comedy and theater. The app compiles data of unsold tickets from various suppliers and displays the 50 best results for the selected venue, determined by price and location through a proprietary algorithm. To do so, Gametime curates available tickets from suppliers that include teams, primary and secondary ticket outlets, and users of the app itself. Seat options are accompanied by photographs of the view from the seat and the seat's location in the form of a map pin on a map of the venue, where possible.

As time draws closer to an event's start, Gametime strategically reduces ticket prices for last-minute customers, as those tickets generally lose value during this timeframe. Tickets for each event are available until 90 minutes after the event started. Gametime recorded that around 80% of transactions take place up to seven days before an event, 50% of those on the day of the event, and more than 10% after that event's start. Tickets purchased through the app are made available digitally through the customer's phone, with a barcode that would be scanned by the venues' scanners or entrance personnel, removing the need to print the tickets. Griffith, who uses the app himself, considered this to be the app's best feature. Payment transactions are handled using Apple Pay and Google Pay, respective to the user's platform; additional integrations for PayPal's Venmo service were added on the day of the service's third-party support introduction.

Gametime High Fives, a rewards program introduced in August 2015, rewarded people who bought tickets to three or more MLB events in which the home team won, a US$5 voucher for use within the app. In April 2016, Gametime was updated with the Snap and Sell feature, which added a user-side ticket resale functionality to the app. Using Snap and Sell, users can take pictures of sports tickets, which are then analyzed using optical character recognition for validity and placed onto the app's marketplace if they apply to its venue lineup. Griffith stated that the feature sought to make selling tickets as easy and accessible as possible, claiming that it only required three taps to bring the ticket to the market, when compared to competitors' "75 taps' worth of data entry" for the same functionality.

Gametime Connect, released in June 2016, saw the integration of two friends-based features; users could see whether friends were presently selling tickets, and were given the ability to directly buy those specific tickets, and whether friends were going to attend an event, enabling users to buy tickets for it so they could attend it together. Gametime FanViews, introduced in April 2017, allows Gametime customers to share their feedback on the quality and atmosphere of the seating they had acquired through the app, and share photos of the event they attended. Information collected through FanViews is aggregated and presented to future customers at checkout.

== Development ==
=== Inception and expansion ===
Founder Brad Griffith, formerly a senior financial analyst for Google, developed the idea of a digital instant-ticketing system for mobile devices when he missed the first inning of an October 2012 National League Championship Series game between the San Francisco Giants and the St. Louis Cardinals. Griffith had realized too late that, in order to validate the tickets, he had to print them out. He was convinced that there had to be a simpler way to purchase event tickets, and eventually decided to start developing an app that would fit this purpose, and founded San Francisco-based Gametime United to go with it. The resulting product was launched for smartphones running iOS in May 2013. An Android version of the app followed in March 2014, and one for Apple Watch devices was released in May 2015.

Initially, Gametime only offered tickets for select stadiums in San Francisco, but soon expanded to Los Angeles. The number of available venues rose to 35 cities the U.S. and Canada by July 2015, and covered 48 cities by February 2016, with over 500 teams featured. Presently, Gametime offers tickets in 60 cities in North America. In August 2015, Gametime advanced into offering tickets for college football, adding 50 of the U.S.' top programs to their catalog. In December 2015, Gametime announced that they would expand into tickets from the music industry, such as those for concerts, to broaden their market availability. In addition to last-minute sales, as is with the case with their sports tickets, admissions to music venues would also be available for purchase several months in advance.

In March 2017, Gametime United employed 80 staff members in its San Francisco offices. According to Griffith, the average Gametime user is a 31-year old white male with a household income of US$67,000, younger than average customers of other companies in the market, and said to be "nearly an inverse" of MLB's demographic. By focusing on the mobile market, Gametime aims at targeting millennials, which comprise 75% of the app's user base.

=== Funding ===
Initial funding for Gametime covered US$900,000 backed by the founders of HotelTonight, the owners of sports clubs like those of the San Francisco Giants, and Xobni co-founder Matt Brezina. In a September 2014 seed funding round led by Accel Partners, Gametime received a total of US$4 million. Investors included executives of HotelTonight, Box, the San Francisco Giants, the Vancouver Whitecaps, Yahoo!, TIBCO Software, the Sacramento Kings and StubHub. Following the investment, StubHub's founder and investment partner, Colin Evans, moved to Gametime United as chief revenue officer. A series A round, again led by Accel Partners, was held in May 2015, adding US$13.3 million. Top investors included key people of the Philadelphia 76ers, the New Jersey Devils and Trunk Club, among multiple partners from previous rounds. An independently hosted series B round attracted new investors, such as GV, Evolution Media Partners and StartX. The round, held in September 2016, raised another US$20 million for Gametime. In May 2022, Gametime raised US$30 million from such investors as Nimble Partners (including Golden State Warriors owner John Burbank), Maven Ventures, Accel, GV, and more.

=== Partnerships ===
In September 2015, Gametime signed a partnership with digital fan destination Bleacher Report for integration within the latter's Team Stream app. As part of the deal, Team Stream would show its users advertisements of inexpensive tickets for upcoming games of their sports teams of interest, which then directly linked to the venues' pages within Gametime. In May 2017, Ticketmaster entered an agreement with Gametime which allowed them to distribute their tickets over the app, with proceeds shared between the two companies and the tickets' respective teams. With the partnership, Ticketmaster sought to better reach Gametime's young target audience and "fish where the fish are". According to Ticketmaster's chief commercial officer, Greg Economou, 12,000 teams and venues that used Ticketmaster would receive a secondary purchase option through Gametime. Financials of the deal were not disclosed.

=== Recognition ===
With revenue growth of 3,856% between 2013 and 2016, Gametime United was named the "fastest growing digital content/media/entertainment company" in Deloitte's 2017 Technology Fast 500. Inc. observed a 34,021% overall three-year growth for the company, as well as US$49 million revenue in 2016, judging them the third-fastest growing company in America in their 2017 Inc. 5000. At the same time, Inc. further revealed Gametime United as the fastest-growing consumer products company in the U.S. According to Brian O'Malley of Accel Partners, Gametime reached US$50 million in gross sales in their 2016 fiscal year, because of which it was "the fastest growing ticketing company ever". Also in 2017, Gametime was named "Best in Mobile Fan Experience" by SportsBusiness Daily, and was given an award in the "Events" category at the Appy Awards.
