= Disney's Pirates of the Caribbean: The Immersive Adventure =

Upcoming immersive theatre production

- Promotional poster
- Company: Secret Cinema
- Genre: Immersive theatre
- Show type: Live immersive production
- Date of premiere: 16 February 2027
- Final show: 25 April 2027
- Location: Secret Cinema, Greenwich Peninsula, London

Creative team
- Licensor: Disney Theatrical Group

Other information
- Based on: Pirates of the Caribbean: The Curse of the Black Pearl
- Official website

Disney's Pirates of the Caribbean: The Immersive Adventure is an upcoming immersive theatre production by Secret Cinema, based on Disney's Pirates of the Caribbean franchise. Produced by Secret Cinema and TodayTix under licence from Disney Theatrical Group, the production is scheduled to open at Secret Cinema's Greenwich Peninsula venue in London in February 2027 for a limited ten-week run.

The production is based on the world and characters of Pirates of the Caribbean: The Curse of the Black Pearl and is planned to include large-scale sets, live performances, stunts, music, and audience interaction within immersive environments.

== Background ==
The project was announced in May 2026 as a large-scale immersive production inspired by Disney's Pirates of the Caribbean franchise. The production was developed through a partnership between Secret Cinema, TodayTix, and Disney Theatrical Group.

The production is part of Secret Cinema's move into a new venue at Greenwich Peninsula. It is planned as the first production at the company's new Greenwich site.

== Format ==
Disney's Pirates of the Caribbean: The Immersive Adventure is planned as an in-person immersive production rather than a conventional seated stage show. The production is planned to include immersive sets, live theatrical performances, stunts, and a live band. Audience members will be able to move through themed environments, encounter characters, and take part in the story.

The experience is based on characters and settings from Pirates of the Caribbean: The Curse of the Black Pearl, including Captain Jack Sparrow, Will Turner, Elizabeth Swann, Tortuga, and the Black Pearl. The listed running time is approximately two hours and thirty minutes.

== Venue and tickets ==
The production is scheduled to take place at Secret Cinema, Olympian Way, Greenwich Peninsula, London. The venue is near North Greenwich tube station and The O2. Performances are scheduled to begin on 16 February 2027. The production is planned as a limited ten-week run.

Tickets for the production went on general sale in June 2026.
