= Fliegel =

Fliegel is a surname. Notable people with the surname include:

- Bernie Fliegel (1918–2009), American standout basketball player
- Gotthard Fliegel (1873–1947), German geographer
- Fritz Fliegel (1907-1941), German track cyclist, Luftwaffe bomber pilot and recipient of the Knight's Cross of the Iron Cross
