= Fabien Riggall =

English filmmaker

Fabien Riggall (born in 1975) is the founder and creative director of Future shorts, Future Cinema and Secret Cinema.

== Career ==
Riggall started his career in film as a runner and worked his way up going from working as assistant producer to producing short films. He studied at the New York Film Academy.

Fabien Riggall set up Future Shorts in 2003. The company aims to create multi-dimensional environments where audiences experience a film in purpose-built sets, combining art, music, literature, and film in re-imagined, abandoned spaces.

By 2007, Fabien's ideas had evolved to become Secret Cinema and the brand has since expanded to incorporate multiple strands under the umbrella name, including Tell No One, Secret Cinema Presents, Secret Cinema X, Secret Music, and Future Shorts, a global short film-festival. Secret Cinema stages events of varying scale, from a few hundred to a hundred thousand attendees.

Fabien's ambitions are to establish immersive cinema as a mainstream entertainment format in the UK, and has plans for Secret Cinema to take it global.

== Secret Cinema ==
Secret Cinema's experiences are described by Riggall as a response to society's growing reliance on technology and the increasingly dark, unimaginative reality created by global politics. He claims that 'Digital culture has, in some part, disconnected us from our ability to listen, feel and touch. I would like us to fight back, to build worlds in both the live and online spaces that are focuses on building a culture fueled by the desire for randomness, beauty and creativity'.

Riggall's intention is to create Secret Worlds where films can be turned into real life, becoming large-scale cultural experiences in abandoned spaces. The location and details of each World are never revealed and the film title is often kept secret. Riggall has founded the belief that art can change society and tell truth in a way that cuts through the noise of media and politics as he says that 'the difference between art and entertainment is that art is about changing the world (...) It has a responsibility'.

=== Secret Cinema X ===
- In 2011, the concept of a Secret Restaurant was launched by the joint collaboration of Secret cinema and St John restaurant. Just like Secret Cinema did for film, the audience was immersed in a gastronomic evening within a specifically designed location, adapting its cinematographic concept to the culinary world.
- The same year, Riggall exported his screenings to Afghanistan's capital, Kabul : 'the idea is that anyone, anywhere should have access to film. I am very passionate about the idea that culture should be made available to people.' Riggall collaborated with Travis Bear who had organized a music festival in Kabul earlier on.
- In 2013, Riggall applied the concept of an immersive cinematographic experience to music. He presented Laura Marling's 'Once I Was An Eagle' during secret performances. The event took place in an old school that had been transformed into a hotel. The guests and performers were invited to wander around the old Manoir, as each room became a song, creating an interactive retelling of Marling's work.
- In 2014, Fabien Riggall announced during a speech at the Toronto International Film Festival that he wishes to see every single venue become multi-purpose, so that cinema may be watched in different spaces. He aims to map out all the world's abandoned buildings and turn them 'into cultural spaces where local communities come together and meet each other in a real setting'.
- Star Wars The Empire Strikes Back was transformed into a secret world in 2015. One of the most ambitious events that Secret Cinema had ever attempted focussed on the galactic world of Tatooine and invited people to join the Rebel Alliance and fight back against the evil Empire. The event was praised by many for its "spectacular sets", however was criticised for its ticket price (more below).
- In 2018, a warehouse in Central London was transformed into Chinatown for a brand new production of Blade Runner. The much anticipated show garnered high praise from critics and visitors alike, seemingly balancing the high production quality with a more affordable ticket price. In an article from The Hollywood News they announced that the event took £4.8 Million in box office takings over the course of sixteen weeks.
- In the summer of 2018, Secret Cinema ventured into the world of Shakespeare with Baz Luhrmann's Romeo + Juliet. Within a park in Central London, Verona Beach was recreated, with attractions including a ferris wheel and the iconic abandoned stage at Sycamore Grove. The director himself, Baz Luhrmann attended one of the shows and praised Riggall for creating "a whole new art form, and a new way of appreciating film and theatre".

== Cultural activism ==
=== March for Europe ===
Rigall co-organized a pro-Europe demonstration, following Brexit results, which brought together 50, 000 protesters in the streets of London. March for Europe became UK's largest political mobilization of 2016.

=== Secret Protest ===
In September 2015, Fabien set up #loverefugees, a movement to raise awareness of the plight of refugees globally. As part of this project, Fabien installed a temporary cinema in the Calais refugee camp known as the Jungle, the biggest in Western Europe. Fabien motivates his activism by explaining how the refugees will be 'having an escape from their predicament through access to culture ' as the screening 'will offer a break from this constant reality of living in tents'. Subsequently, to the bulldozing of the camp, Riggall donated £25 000 from his production The Empire Strikes Back to the Refugee Council.

=== Supporting Junior Doctors ===
In 2015, Riggall launched an event supporting Junior Doctors. Fabien insists that Secret Cinema is a socially conscious organisation that supports different ongoing debates; he expressed his solidarity towards the shortfall in Junior doctors' employment rate, as he created a whole world around the horror movie 28 days later. The NHS has a shortage in staff, and is losing control over an epidemic of rage and most of the population is contaminated. The viewers were thrown into a post-apocalyptic world where the population had been decimated by a deadly virus. The performance's plot aimed to show the importance of a well staffed medical work force.

=== Secret Youth ===
Riggall created Secret Youth in order to empower Youth through a better access to culture.

- In 2011, the England Riots provoked a violent turmoil in London Boroughs and across the country. The epicenter of the protests started in Tottenham, London, where Mark Duggan was shot dead by the Police. As a reaction to the strife, Riggall screened La Haine, in presence of the producer Mathieu Kassovitz, at the Broadway Community Centre, Tottenham. The movie offers a view of the brutal protests that shook Paris's banlieues in the 1990s, just like the 2011 riots did in the UK. Through this cathartic mirroring of realities, Riggall explains how his ambition was to bring communities back together through the cinematographic expression of their condition, and more specifically to empower youth with a better access to culture. The screening was then brought to the heart Paris's banlieue, Saint-Denis, as Riggall aimed to continue supporting youth where riots began.
- In 2017, Riggall participated in Misk Global Forum in Riyadh, where he revealed the launch of his new youth movement : We Dream Arabia. Just as Arabia's entertainment landscape is currently shifting, Riggall affirmed his wish to support Saudi's youth to create an innovative cinema. Shortly after the Forum, the Crown Prince Mohamed Bin Salam lifted a 35 years ban on movie theaters.

=== Night for Ukraine benefit ===
Riggall, in collaboration with the Ukrainian pop duo Bloom Twins, organized Night for Ukraine, a fundraising benefit held at the Roundhouse in north London on the evening of March 9, 2022, with the funds raised being donated to the Disasters Emergency Committee appeal, to provide aid to people fleeing Ukraine following the Russian invasion.

== Foundation Participation ==
- Shortly after Robin William's death, Riggall organized a Screening of the Dead Poets Society in aid of the mental health charity Mind.
- Secret Cinema's One Flew Over the Cuckoo's Nest was organized in partnership with a mental health charity. The performance took over an old hospital where the audience had to get their mental health checked, making the viewers become patients.
- The Shawshank Redemption happened in partnership with Amnesty International. Real-life cases of unjustly incarcerated people were summoned upon the audience at a court, the viewers were then taken to a prison.
- Charlie Chaplin's The Great Dictator was screened in support of the freedom of expression charity Article 19 as a result to North Korea's hack over Sony Pictures movie The Interview; « a secret screening to protest against censorship».

== Criticism ==
=== Secret Cinema ===
In 2015, Twitter-users blamed Secret Cinema for leaving their actors unpaid. Riggall denied these accusations : 'We are a massive employer of performers. We run a government-regulated volunteer scheme that allows people to have experience in Secret Cinema. (...) I believe passionately in giving experience to people (...) It's a theatrical experience. You could say that all the audience are acting'.

The Independent describes Secret's Cinema's predominant problem to be its cost, going up to £75 for large scale production such as The Empire Strikes Back. Riggall counters that his productions are comparable to West End theatre shows, rather than any other Cinema in London, and therefore so is the ticket price.

=== Sale of Secret Cinema ===
In September 2022, Secret Cinema announced it was being acquired by TodayTix for £29,310,651.00

== Honours & Appearances ==
Fabien has received honours from the likes of The Hospital Club, Time Out and The Evening Standard and brands including Honda and Courvoisier. In their list of London's Most Influential People, the Evening Standard wrote that "Riggall has pioneered a whole new genre".

- The Guardian's Top 100 Influential People In Film
- The Evening Standard's Top 1000 Influential People in London
- The Hospital Club's Top 100 Influential People in Creative Industries
- Creative Review's Creative Leaders 50
- Honda Dream Factory's Cultural Engineer
- Juror AFRIFF, Lagos 2017
- Misk Global Forum, Riyadh 2017
- St. Petersburg International Cultural Forum, St. Petersburg 2017
- Evening Standard's Young Progress Makers, London 2017
- Remix Summit, London 2017
- Industry Conference at TIFF, 2014
- Remix Summit, NYC 2014
- Architectural Association: 'Performance & the City' symposium, London 2014
- The Future of Storytelling, NYC 2013
- TEDx Youth, Bath 2012
