= CoachUp =

American sports coaching company

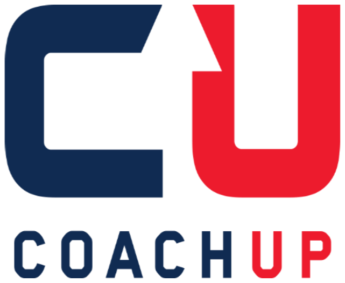
- Industry: Private sports coaching
- Founded: 2011
- Headquarters: Boston, Massachusetts, U.S.
- Area served: Nationwide in the US
- Key people: Alex Stone (CEO); Jordan Fliegel (President/Founder)
- Services: Connects athletes with private coaches
- Number of employees: 24
- Website: coachup.com

CoachUp is an American venture-funded startup company that connects athletes with private coaches.

== History ==
CoachUp was founded in 2011 by former professional basketball player Jordan Fliegel with engineers Arian Radmand and Gabe Durazo. Its site, CoachUp.com, officially launched on May 9, 2012. The firm is headquartered in Boston.

In November 2012, the firm raised a $2.2 million seed round led by venture capital firms General Catalyst Partners and Breakaway Innovation Group. Along with the two VC firms, angel investors including Dharmesh Shah, Ty Danco and Walt Winshall also took part in the funding. In November 2013, it raised a Series A round, this time co-led by Point Judith Capital and General Catalyst Partners. Other investors joining this round were Datapoint Capital, Suffolk Equity Partners, Breakaway, as well as angel investors Paul English and Albert Dobron of Providence Equity Partners. In January 2015, it was announced that former The Princeton Review chief marketing officer John Kelley was appointed as CoachUp's new CEO. In December 2015, Jordan Fliegel left the company to establish a similar venture. In January 2016, the headquarters of the company was moved to the Mount Ida Campus of the University of Massachusetts Amherst.

== Recognition and partnerships ==
In 2011, the Massachusetts Technology Leadership Council awarded CoachUp a Golden Ticket to become a member of the CriticalMass entrepreneur community. In March 2012, Jordan Fliegel took 1st Place at the Microsoft Ultra Light Startup pitch competition in Cambridge, MA. Shortly after its launch, CoachUp was selected to participate in the MassChallenge 2012 Accelerator Program and was later announced as $50k Gold Winner. Concurrently, the firm joined TechStars Boston as a member of the Fall 2012 class. On October 25, 2012, HubSpot CTO and founder Dharmesh Shah invested in CoachUp. On February 22, 2013, CoachUp was named a finalist in the Sports & Fitness category of BostInno's "50 ON FIRE" Awards.

CoachUp is the official private coaching partner of the Positive Coaching Alliance. the company launched an annual scholarship program for student athletes in June 2013.

== Athlete Advisory Council ==
CoachUp established their Athlete Advisory Council in early 2014 with the purpose of partnering with current and former professional athletes to improve and develop connections between athletes and coaches. It was announced in May 2014 that Philadelphia 76ers Center Nerlens Noel joined the Athlete Advisory Council. Soon after, Cam Neely, president of the Boston Bruins became its second member. In September 2014, CoachUp announced that New England Patriots Wide Receiver Julian Edelman joined the Athlete Advisory Council by releasing a short video of Edelman reading his 2009 NFL draft scouting report.
