= Splitwise =

American financial technology company

- Release: February 2011; 15 years ago
- Type: Personal finance software
- Website: www.splitwise.com

Splitwise is an online expense-splitting application software accessible via web browser and mobile app. The app facilitates repayments of shared bills by calculating what each person in a group owes. The primary competitor to the app is Venmo, which only operates in the U.S.

Splitwise allows users to create groups with friends to determine what each person owes. All expenses and allocations are added to the app, and Splitwise simplifies the transaction history to determine exactly what payments need to be made to whom to settle outstanding balances. Splitwise stores user information via cloud storage.

It was developed and is owned by Splitwise Inc., headquarters are based in Providence, Rhode Island, United States.

== History ==
The app was launched in February 2011 as SplitTheRent, intended to be used for rent splitting, by Ryan Laughlin, Jon Bittner and Marshall Weir.

In September 2013, Splitwise was integrated with Venmo to allow users to settle payments via Venmo.

In April 2024, Splitwise partnered with Tink, a Visa payment services company, to incorporate a bank transfer feature directly in the Splitwise app.

=== Financing ===
In December 2014, the company raised $1.4 million.

In October 2016, the company raised $5 million.

In April 2021, Splitwise raised $20 million in funding from series A round run by Insight Partners.

== Reception ==
A 2022 opinion piece in The Guardian by London journalist Imogen West-Knights shared the negative effects of exactly splitting bills among friends and family members. West-Knights argued that Splitwise and similar apps can "turn people into those true enemies of all that is fun and joyful in the world: accountants." However, she said the app does work better when used by couples rather than friend groups.

Other reviews noted that the app makes people petty.

In contrast, an article published by Condé Nast Traveler describes how Splitwise eliminated stress caused by complicated offline bill splitting, saying it "fixed such a pervasive obstacle in group travel."

Coverage by The Wall Street Journal lands somewhere in between the two contrasting views, saying Splitwise and similar apps are helpful, but users need to be prepared for difficult money-related conversations that may arise. An etiquette advisor at Debrett's, said, "The less talk you can have about money on any of these occasions, the better." An editor suggested conversations as simple as asking, "We’re splitting this evenly, right?" before a meal.

== See also ==
- List of personal finance software
