= Jessica Verrilli =

American venture capitalist

- Education: Stanford University
- Occupations: Entrepreneur, Venture capitalist, Angel investor

Jessica Verrilli is an American entrepreneur, venture capitalist and angel investor. She is a general partner at GV, where she focuses on early-stage technology investments. Previously she served as vice president of corporate development and strategy at Twitter, where she helped lead the company's mergers, acquisitions, and strategic initiatives. She co-founded the women's investing group #Angels and the venture capital firm Adverb Ventures.

== Early life and education ==
Verrilli holds a B.A. in human biology from Stanford University, where she was selected as a Stanford Mayfield Fellow in 2007 and participated on the varsity women's lacrosse team.

== Career ==
Verrilli began her career at the venture capital firm Venrock in early 2008 as an investment associate.

In 2009, she joined Twitter as a senior director of corporate development and strategy while the company expanded from an early-stage startup into a publicly traded multinational technology company. She later served as vice president of corporate development and strategy before departing the company in 2017.

Verrilli became a general partner at Google Ventures, now GV, after rejoining the firm in May 2018.

As an angel investor, Verrilli co-founded the women's investing group #Angels, and in 2023 founded Adverb Ventures April Underwood.
