= Kimber Lockhart =

American computer scientist

- Education: Stanford University
- Title: Chief Technology Officer
- Scientific career
- Workplaces: One Medical Group

Kimber Lockhart is the Chief Technology Officer at One Medical Group. Previously, she was the Senior Director of Web Application Engineering at Box. Prior to joining Box, she co-founded Increo, a secure web-based document sharing and review service. Increo was acquired by Box in October 2009.

== Education ==
Lockhart holds a B.S. in computer science from Stanford University. In 2007, during her junior year, she started the software project Increo with Jeff Seibert. The initial prototype was IdeaCV, an "idea feedback engine" which was created for a class assignment. The group continued to build and test it throughout the year while getting feedback from users. In May of her senior year, the idea had developed into a more general "document feedback" concept. The team had acquired enough adoption to plan ahead for graduation and raise seed funding. In June, they moved into an office and Lockhart took on a business development role that grew to the position of CEO after graduation.

== Career ==
Increo launched in 2008, and was purchased by Box for an undisclosed sum in October 2009. Lockhart joined One Medical in 2014, first as vice president of engineering and then as chief technology officer.

== Public speaking ==
She has spoken on the issues of women in technology. She is featured in the documentary She++ and has been the keynote speaker at the annual Women Engineers Code Conference at Harvard.
