= Bloom Twins =

British musical duo

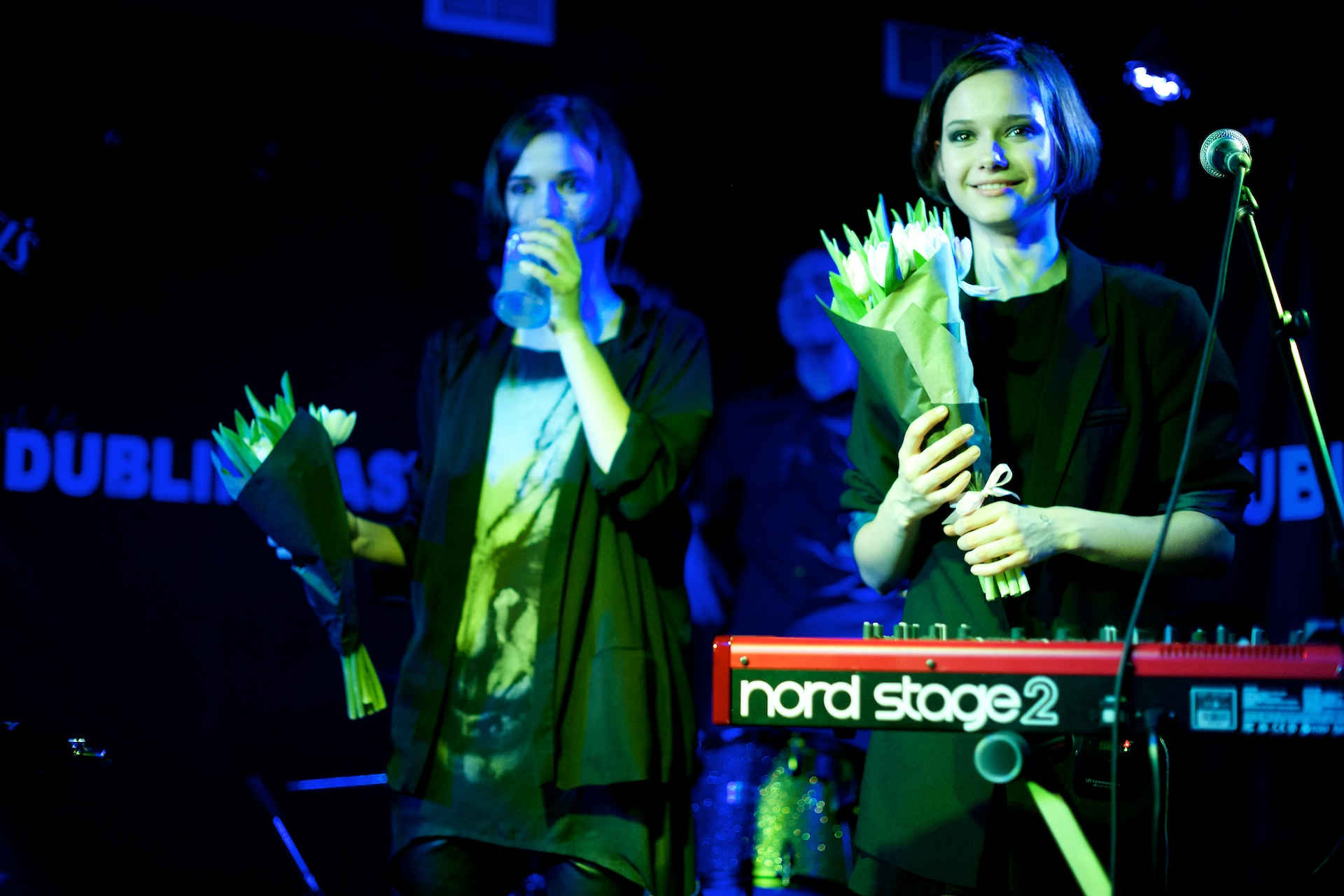
- Bloom Twins at Dublin Castle; Anna Kuprienko, Sofiia Kuprienko

Background information
- Origin: London, England, United Kingdom
- Genres: Dark pop, electronic
- Instruments: keyboard, flute, harmonica, drums
- Years active: 2013 – present
- Members: Anna Kuprienko; Sofiia Kuprienko
- Past members: Paul Love
- Website: www.bloomtwins.com

Bloom Twins are a British pop music group made up of twin sisters Anna and Sofiia Kuprienko. They refer to the style of their music as "dark pop." The duo released their first digital single in June 2013.

== History ==
Anna and Sofiia Kuprienko grew up in the small town of Brovary, Ukraine, a suburb of Kyiv. The girls started singing early and were playing instruments at the age of five years. Later on they have moved to London and pursued their musical careers. When Bloom Twins uploaded their first track to YouTube - "Fahrenheit" - in June 2013 they were 17 years old.

Bloom Twins made a double impact on both music and fashion, opening the door to numerous profile pieces in magazines such as Vogue, Numero, Wonderland and ID. Soon after, a support slot for Eels at O2 Academy in Liverpool was followed by Iggy's artist of the week at MTV.

Following the release of "Get up, Stand up" the Bloom Twins were featured on BBC NewsNight with Jeremy Paxman and graced pages of broadsheet coverage in most of the UK's leading newspapers and magazines such as The Sunday Times, The Guardian, Newsweek as well as appeared on BBC Introducing. A period out of the country halted momentum before they made a breakthrough appearance in UNICEF’s Imagine campaign alongside Katy Perry and Will.i.am and other heavyweights of music and media, two years in a row.

Bloom Twins Made their mark in Europe and the Far East where they have toured extensively with a number of high-profile artists from Eels and LP to Duran Duran, Seal and Nile Rodgers – in addition to headlining their own shows and festival dates: alternative TGE, Standon Calling.

Both girls can play the flute, keyboard, harmonica and are learning the drums and guitar.

== Night for Ukraine benefit ==
The Bloom Twins collaborated with Fabien Riggall to organize Night for Ukraine, a fundraising benefit held at the Roundhouse in north London on the evening of March 9, 2022, with the funds raised being donated to the Disasters Emergency Committee appeal, to provide aid to people fleeing Ukraine following the Russian invasion. They also performed at the benefit, with an A Capella set and a new song they wrote on the first day of the war.

== Discography ==
Bloom Twins have released ten digital singles, an EP named Winter's Tales and three digital DJ remixes of their singles "Amnesia", "Set Us Free" and "Talk to Me".

Their first release was a reinterpretation of Kish Mauve's Fahrenheit. In support of the Euromaidan protesters occupying Independence Square in Kyiv, they recorded a cover of Bob Marley's Get Up, Stand Up. The girls felt that every line in the song reflected Ukraine. In March of that year, they released their next single "Blue".

In June 2016, "Amnesia" was released and accompanied by a music video. Later in December another track and a video for their single "Set Us Free" were released.

For their 6th single "Talk To Me", Bloom Twins have teamed up with Sane and Samaritans, with the track's theme revolving around mental health issues.

Their 7th single is called "She's Not Me" and it was released via multiple musical platforms on 16 February 2018.

2021 releases included collaborations with Jan Blomqvist and Purple Disco Machine.

Their 2023 releases, "Drunk & Loud" and "Beats Not Bombs," addressed the invasion of their native Ukraine.

After signing a 2025 publishing deal with Armada Music Publishing, they collaborated on a trio of singles with electronic music producers Damian Lazarus, Reinier Zonneveld, and Klangkarussell.

=== Extended plays ===
Title	Details
Winter's Tales	Released: 12 May 2020; Label: Lcuk Artists; Formats: Digital download

=== Singles ===
Year	Single
2013	"Fahrenheit"
2014	"Get up Stand up #WeAreUkraine"
2014	"Blue"
2016	"Amnesia"
2016	"Set Us Free"
2017	"Talk to Me"
2018	"She's Not Me"
2018	"Young Souls"
2019	"Love Me Right Now"
2019	"Free Fall (In2ruders Soundtrack)"
2021	"DayDream" (with Benny Benassi)
2021	"High On Beat" (with Jan Blomqvist)
2021	"Opposite of Crazy" (Purple Disco Machine feat. Bloom Twins)
2023	"Drunk & Loud"
2023	"Beats Not Bombs"
2025	"Alive" (Damian Lazarus feat. Bloom Twins)
2025	"Mama Maria" (Reiner Zonneveld feat. Bloom Twins)
2025	"Cross the Border" (Klangkarussell feat. Bloom Twins)
