= Crashlytics =

Software company

- Industry: Software industry
- Founded: May 13, 2011; 15 years ago
- Founders: Wayne Chang, Jeff Seibert
- Fate: Acquired by Twitter, Inc.
- Headquarters: Boston, Massachusetts, San Francisco, California
- Products: Crashlytics for iOS, Crashlytics for Android, Crashlytics for OSX, Crashlytics for Apple tvOS, Crashlytics for Unity, Beta by Crashlytics, Answers, Fabric, SecureUDID
- Members: 2+ billion devices, 1+ million apps
- Parent: Google (previously Twitter, Inc.)
- Website: firebase.google.com/products/crashlytics

Crashlytics was a Boston, Massachusetts-based software company founded in May 2011 by entrepreneurs Wayne Chang and Jeff Seibert. Crashlytics helps collecting, analyzing and organizing app crash reports.

Its main product is a software development kit for crash reporting, application logging, online review and statistical analysis of application logs. It supports iOS, Android and Unity.

In January 2013, Twitter acquired Crashlytics for over $100 million. Most of the package was in stock vesting over four years with an upfront payment of $38.2 million in common Twitter stock.

In January 2017, Google announced that it signed an agreement to acquire Crashlytics and its offspring creations including Fabric and Answers. The acquisition would bolster its existing efforts in mobile by becoming part of the Firebase platform and known as Firebase Crashlytics.

== History ==
Wayne Chang and Jeff Seibert co-founded Crashlytics in 2011. The company raised $1 million from venture capitalists Flybridge Capital Partners and Baseline Ventures as well as individual angel investors. In April 2012, Crashlytics raised an additional $5 million.

In March 2012, under privacy pressure, Apple began to deprecate the UDID – the unique identifier that ties a user to a specific phone. In response, the Crashlytics team built and released SecureUDID, an open-source alternative to UDID.

In June 2012, Crashlytics acquired FireTower.app, a tool used to detect JavaScript errors in websites. This acquisition was to help expand Crashlytics beyond mobile apps and into the mobile web. FireTower.app was a Boston-based company. Terms of the acquisition were not disclosed, but Crashlytics co-founder Wayne Chang says the other side is “very happy.”

In January 2013, about a year after Crashlytics launched, Twitter announced it had acquired the company. The acquisition price was pegged at over $100 million (valued at about $259 million when Twitter IPO'd), which was Twitter's largest acquisition at the time.

In May 2015, SourceDNA released a report that showed Crashlytics as #1 in terms of adoption and usage by apps. The data also showed that Crashlytics was more than #2–6 combined.

In August 2016, MightySignal shows Crashlytics as in 42% of the top 200, which included apps like Twitter, Uber, Amazon, Spotify, Pinterest and many others.

In January 2017, four years after Twitter made the acquisition, Google announced it had signed an agreement to acquire Crashlytics.

== Fabric ==
In October 2014, Crashlytics announced Fabric, an expansion of functionality into mobile app analytics, beta distribution, and user identity and authentication. Fabric represented the first introduction of a modular SDK platform, which allowed developers to pick and choose which features they needed while guaranteeing ease of installation and compatibility across all. By further tying distribution of MoPub (mobile advertising) and TwitterKit (login with Twitter and Tweet display functionality) to Fabric/Crashlytics, Twitter was able to take advantage of Crashlytics' large adoption and device footprint to rapidly scale usage of its own mobile developer products. Because of the decision to build on top of Crashlytics, Fabric reached active distribution across 1 Billion mobile devices just 8 months after its launch.

Fabric launched its mobile app in early 2016.

By the end of 2016, Fabric was serving more than 2 billion active devices and processing 310 billion app sessions a month. Through Crashlytics and its mobile analytics service (called Answers by Crashlytics), Fabric was ranked #1 by MightySignal as the most implemented crash reporting and mobile analytics solution among the top 200 iOS apps.

In January 2017, Google acquired Crashlytics and Fabric.

In October 2019, the Fabric team announced that all Fabric features including Crashlytics had been migrated to Firebase and that Fabric would shut down on March 31, 2020.

== Timeline ==
In October 2011, Crashlytics raised $1 million from Flybridge Capital Partners and Baseline Ventures, along with individual investors David Chang, Lars Albright, Jennifer Lum, Peter Wernau, Roy Rodenstein, Chris Sheehan, Ty Danco, Joe Caruso, and others.

In April 2012, Crashlytics raised another $5 million from Flybridge Capital Partners and Baseline Ventures.

In June 2012, Crashlytics acquires FireTower.app to expand into the mobile web.

In June 2012, Crashlytics wins the MITX Innovation Award from Massachusetts Innovation & Technology Exchange.

In January 2013, Twitter acquires Crashlytics for over $100 million (later valued at $259.5 million at Twitter's IPO).

In February 2013, Crashlytics announced all Enterprise features were free to all developers.

In March 2013, Crashlytics wins the 50 on Fire award.

In May 2013, Crashlytics announces support for Android.

In February 2014, Crashlytics announces "Beta by Crashlytics", its mobile app beta distribution tool.

In October 2014, Crashlytics announces Fabric, a modular mobile platform to build apps.

In May 2015, a third-party site, SourceDNA, ranked Crashlytics as #1 in mobile performance.

In May 2015, Crashlytics announces native (NDK) support for Android was announced.

In October 2015, Crashlytics announces support for Unity, the most popular mobile game engine.

In December 2015, Crashlytics announces support for Apple's tvOS.

In August 2016, Crashlytics was ranked #1 most adopted crash reporting SDK among the top 200 iOS apps by MightySignal.

In December 2016, Answers was ranked #1 most adopted mobile analytics SDK by MightSignal.

In January 2017, Crashlytics and Fabric were acquired by Google.

In September 2018, Google announces that Fabric will be deprecated and developers should use Crashlytics via Firebase.

In October 2019, Google announces that Fabric will be deprecated on March 31, 2020. Crashlytics and other Fabric products will continue as part of Firebase.
