= Corporate development =

Business planning

Corporate development refers to the planning and execution of strategies to meet organizational objectives, primarily through mergers and acquisitions or divestitures. The kinds of activities falling under corporate development may include strategic planning, market and competitor mapping and tracking, phasing in or out of markets or products, arranging strategic alliances or partnerships or joint ventures, identifying and acquiring companies (M&A), securing funding (various forms of equity or debt) or corporate financing, divesting of assets or divisions or selling the whole company, listing on a stock exchange or undertaking various capital management initiatives.

== Process ==
Corporate strategy depends on the circumstances of a company and the area where development is desired. Corporate development is usually a process that takes place over an extended period of time and may be adjusted or refined as the project moves forward

== Reshaping management ==
One of the manifestations of corporate development has to do with reshaping the management arm of the corporation. This may involve a process of phasing certain management positions out of the existing structure or creating new positions in an effort to strengthen the management team. As part of this type of approach, corporate development may also demand that one or more current managers are released from the company and replaced with people who possess skills required to move the company forward. When this is the case, the corporate development team will handle the functions of recruitment and evaluation of potential hires.

== Growing the company ==
The process of corporate development can also be applied to the task of growing the company through mergers and acquisitions. In this scenario, the project development will involve identifying potential target companies for acquisitions or unions resulting in a new and more aggressive corporation. The team will consider all possible outcomes from any given potential merger or acquisition and attempt to project if the action is likely to result in positive growth or could possibly impair the company permanently.

Just as a management team may be revamped, corporate development may also be employed to change the current focus for clients. This may mean looking into the potential for breaking into new markets with existing products or developing complementary products that will allow this type of expansion. Corporate development strategy would monitor the trends associated with a corporation's products or services and helps the corporation establish strategies to find more customers. In addition, corporate development works to maximize the profits of a corporation by figuring out the appropriate pricing for a given good or service. A corporate development team also leads discussions with sales department heads regarding how to market corporate goods, organize marketing campaigns, analyze market research and incorporate any customer advice or complaints into marketing strategies in such cases; extensive industry specific business experience is often preferred which is why companies may hire an external firm to help them engage in such moves.

Depending on the status of the base market, corporate development may also look at shifting away from a shrinking consumer market while seeking market share in a different consumer market with newer products. For example, many typewriter manufacturers during the 1980s and 1990s slowly phased out their core business and began to focus more on computer parts and accessories as a way to continue operations.

== Need for specialists ==
Particularly in larger companies, corporate development is provided as a charter for a particular executive or team. In these cases, the opportunities and initiatives are numerous enough to justify specialists, instead of being delegated to the office of the CEO and line of business executives. When focused on product or financial issues, corporate development executives often have MBA, CFA or CPA credentials. Advanced technical degrees (Ph.D., M.S.) are highly sought in corporate development executives so that they can understand and align strategic, technical, and tactical goals with financial targets. Teams contract and often hire a corporate development contributor from a legal or investment banking background due to the complex contractual and valuation issues associated with many transactions.

== See also ==
- Business development
