= Gotthard Fliegel =

German geographer (1873–1947)

Gotthard Fliegel (28 December 1873 – 22 June 1947) was a German geographer. His work was mostly on western Germany, especially the Lower Rhine basin. He was born in Dammer in Lower Silesia and attended the Maria-Magdalenen school in Wrocław. He then studied at the University of Wrocław, where he gained a Ph.D. after his 1898 dissertation on the spread of marine Pennsylvanian rocks in South and East Asia. Later that year, he moved to the Geological-Palaeontological Institute in Bonn, where he remained until 1903 as an assistant to Clemens Schlüter. He then became a geologist with the Prussian Geological Institute in Berlin and in 1923 became a department director. In 1919 he became associate professor at the Agricultural University of Berlin. The rise of the Nazis led to his retirement in 1934.

His son Fritz Fliegel was a Luftwaffe pilot and Knight Cross holder killed in World War II.
