= Future Shorts =

English short film label

Future Shorts is a short film label based in London. It was founded in 2003 by Fabien Riggall. It organizes a monthly short film festival, Future Shorts ONE, that screens short films by filmmakers from all over the world.

The Guardian Guide referred to Future Shorts as "an association that sifts through the world of short film every month so you don't have to" in an article about their participation in the Short Film Weekend of London in 2004. Their program at the festival included films by Chris Morris, Lynne Ramsay, Mike Leigh, as well as Run Wrake. According to Screen Daily, Future Shorts "offers a platform for film-makers in 25 countries."

Future Shorts launched a DVD distribution division in May 2007. In September 2007, it launched a web TV service in partnership with Joost.

The festival has also worked with various organisations and companies. The company collaborated with Samsung to promote their new phone, the Samsung i8910 HD. The promotion aimed to show the strength of the phone's HD camera. Four directors were chosen, whose short films were available on the Future Shorts website, where people could vote of their favourite.
