= New England Venture Capital Association =

- NEVCA Logo
- Company type: Trade Association
- Industry: Venture Capital
- Founded: 1902
- Headquarters: Cambridge, Massachusetts
- Area served: New England
- Services: Lobbying, Networking
- Website: newenglandvc.org

The New England Venture Capital Association (NEVCA) is a trade association. The NEVCA represents the interests of venture capital investors by promoting entrepreneurship. As of 2014, the association represented members from over 90 firms and had an annual budget of $1 million.

== History ==
NEVCA was founded in 1902 as a loose association of the regional investment bodies. At that time, the organization had no full-time staff and served primarily as a communications channel between investors. Since its foundation, NEVCA has grown into a much larger regional body that represents hundreds of partner firms who manage thousands of companies, with tens of billions of dollars in capital.

In 2018 NEVCA advocated for non-compete reform in a Massachusetts Economic Development bill, specifically to reduce non-compete maximum duration to 6 months and to require 100% garden leave for employers.
