= TodayTix =

Event ticketing website

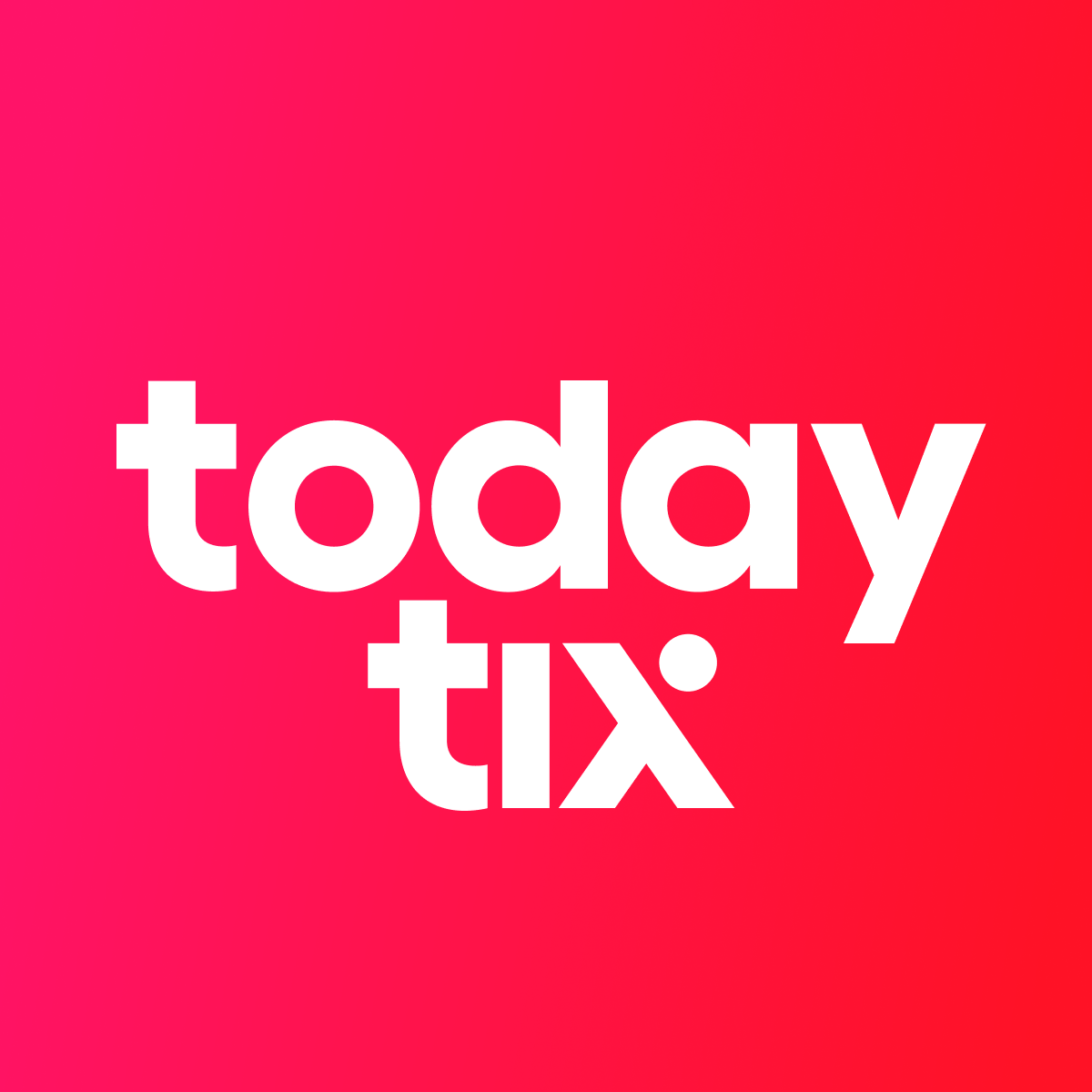
- Company type: Private
- Website type: Theater ticketing platform
- Available in: English
- Headquarters: New York City, {{{location_country}}}
- Area served: New York City, London, San Francisco, Los Angeles, Washington DC, Chicago, Sydney, Melbourne, and Brisbane
- Founders: Brian Fenty (CEO & Co-Founder); Merritt Baer (President & Co-Founder)
- Launched: December 2013
- Current status: Active

TodayTix is a digital ticketing platform for theatrical and cultural events. Founded by two Broadway producers, TodayTix's free mobile apps for iOS and Android provide access to theater shows in New York City, London, the San Francisco Bay Area, Los Angeles, Washington DC, Chicago, Sydney, Melbourne, and Brisbane.

== History ==
Headquartered in New York City, the arts-meets-technology startup was founded in March 2013, by Broadway producers Brian M. Fenty (CEO & Co-Founder) and Merritt Baer (President & Co-Founder). As of 2013, fewer than .1% of tickets for Broadway shows were being bought via smartphone apps or otherwise using mobile devices, according to The Broadway League - presenting a large opportunity for TodayTix to better make theater accessible to millennials. Fenty subsequently became CEO in 2017.

A beta version of the app was released in September 2013 for customers with iPhones to test. Within three months the app had been used to buy tickets 50,000 times. The TodayTix app was officially launched in December 2013.

In May 2014, the company received $1 million in an additional seed funding round from Rubicon Venture Capital, Ryan Rockefeller, Nicolas Jammet, and Jessica Verrilli. In November 2014, TodayTix announced its $5 million Series A financing from investors including Rubicon Venture Capital (again), TYLT Lab, Scott Birnbaum and SF Capital Group.

As of mid-2015, TodayTix began "selling roughly 3 percent of all the tickets on Broadway" and by February 2016, it was 4%. As of February 2021, 1.6 million people had purchased tickets via TodayTix, and 3.6 million users are registered customers.

In September 2018, TodayTix celebrated 5 years with a milestone of reaching $250 million in tickets sold. Following this anniversary, TodayTix launched an original content venture called "TodayTix Presents," that offers audiences first-look access to performances from their favorite artists debuting new work.

In May 2019, TodayTix announced a growth equity investment of $73 million, led by Great Hill Partners, to enter its next stage of growth.

In February 2020, TodayTix acquired Encore Tickets and its subsidiary brands, leading to the formation of TodayTix Group. TodayTix Group announced the acquisition of review aggregator website Show-Score in July 2020, and Broadway Roulette in May 2021, Goldstar in January 2022, and Secret Cinema in September 2022. TodayTix, London Theatre and New York Theatre Guide. Show-Score, Broadway Roulette, and Secret Cinema continue to operate as independent brands under TodayTix Group's growing portfolio. In 2022, TodayTix announced plans to relocate its headquarters from 32 Avenue of the Americas to 1501 Broadway.

In October 2025, MARI — a global events and experiences company uniting world-class events across sport, art, theatre, and lifestyle, founded by Ari Emanuel with Mark Shapiro as Principal Investor and Board Member — acquired TodayTix Group. Terms of the deal were not disclosed. Private equity firm Great Hill Partners, which had acquired a majority stake in TodayTix in 2019, sold its stake to MARI as part of the transaction. Brian Fenty, co-founder and CEO of TodayTix Group, retained his role as chief executive and joined MARI's executive leadership team. Prior to the announcement, it had been reported that ATG Entertainment had explored the possibility of purchasing TodayTix Group.

== International expansion ==
In June 2015, TodayTix launched in London's West End and began offering the first paperless tickets for shows in London's West End theatre district in August 2015. In 2019 they expanded to Melbourne and Sydney, Australia

== Operations and products ==
TodayTix launched the first-ever mobile lotteries for theater tickets, both on Broadway and in London's West End, selling discounted same-day tickets via lotteries conducted through its apps. It also features a special TodayTix Rush program, in which deeply discounted tickets are offered on a first-come first-serve basis the same day of a performance, and Standby, which releases same-day tickets on a first-come, first-served basis for sold-out shows. In New York City, TodayTix also operates the exclusive digital lottery for Free Shakespeare in the Park, providing mobile access to no-cost tickets for performances at the Delacorte Theater.

In July 2024, TodayTix introduced TodayTix Rewards, a tiered loyalty program comprising Red, Silver, and Gold levels. Members earn credits called TixCash and receive benefits such as early access to promotions and presales, participation in Daily Drops, complimentary Ticket Protection, and additional ticket discounts.
