= Cake Financial =

American financial services social network

- Type: Private
- Industry: Investing, Software
- Founded: 2006
- Defunct: January 14, 2010
- Fate: Closed and acquired by E-Trade
- Headquarters: San Francisco, California, United States
- Key people: Steven Carpenter; (Founder and CEO); Sven Junkergård; (Vice President Engineering)
- Products: Rich Internet application
- Number of employees: 20+ (2010)
- Website: www.cakefinancial.com (defunct)

Cake Financial was an American web-based financial services social network for individual investors allowing members to share their real stock portfolios and performance with other members.

== History ==
The site was introduced publicly on 17 September 2007, at the TechCrunch40 Conference, by founder and CEO Steven Carpenter. The company also had a Cake Investment Club application on Facebook.

Cake had generated media coverage from a number of financial news outlets such as Forbes, Kiplinger, BusinessWeek and Barron's. Cake was backed by Alsop Louie Partners, as well as from angel investors. The company was located in San Francisco, California.

As of 14 January 2010, the site discontinued operations and it was announced that it had been acquired by E*Trade.

== See also ==
- Social trading
