= Dylan Smith (businessman) =

American businessman (born 1985)

Dylan C. Smith
- Born: September 27, 1985 (age 40)
- Education: Duke University
- Occupation: Chief Financial Officer of Box
- Known for: Co-founder of Box

Dylan C. Smith is the co-founder and Chief Financial Officer of Box.

== Early life ==
Smith graduated from Duke University with a Bachelor's degree in economics. While at Duke, Smith was a member of Sigma Phi Epsilon.

== Career ==
In 2005, while in college, Smith co-founded Box, along with childhood friend Aaron Levie. Smith invested $20,000 of online poker earnings as seed capital into the company. Smith took a year off from Duke to focus on the company before returning to finish his degree, while still serving as CFO.

== Personal ==
Smith appeared on a 3rd-season episode of reality tv dating show The Millionaire Matchmaker, which aired in 2010.

Smith married Yael Goshen in 2013.
