= Fritz Fliegel =

German cyclist and Luftwaffe pilot

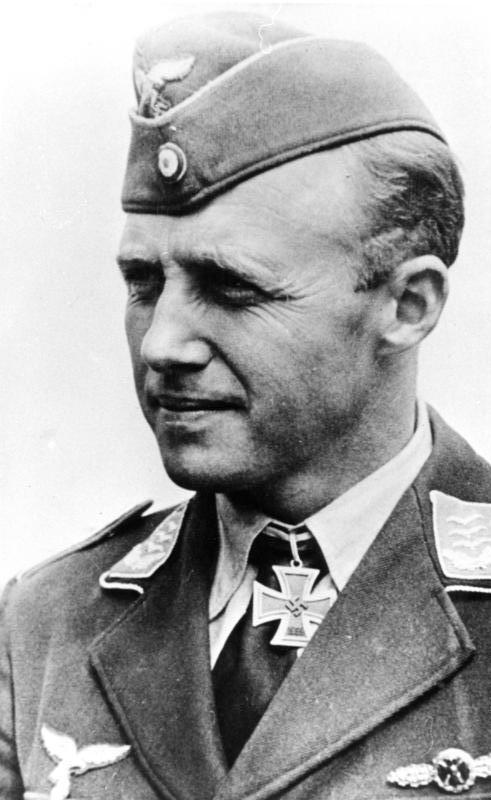
- Born: 30 November 1907; Wilmersdorf, Berlin
- Died: 18 July 1941 (aged 33); Atlantic Ocean
- Cause of death: Killed in action
- Relatives: Gotthard Fliegel (father)
- Military career
- Relatives: Gotthard Fliegel (father)
- Allegiance: Nazi Germany
- Branch: Luftwaffe
- Service years: 1934–41
- Rank: Hauptmann (captain)
- Commands: I./KG 40
- Conflicts: World War II: Invasion of Poland; Atlantic War †
- Awards: Knight's Cross of the Iron Cross
- Cycling career
- Sport: Cycling
- Discipline: Sprint (track cycling)

Major wins
- German amateur champion 1929

Fritz Fliegel (30 November 1907 – 18 July 1941) was a German track cyclist, Luftwaffe bomber pilot and recipient of the Knight's Cross of the Iron Cross, the highest award in the military and paramilitary forces of Nazi Germany during World War II. On 18 July 1941, Fiegel was killed in action flying a Focke-Wulf Fw 200 during the Atlantic War in an attack on convoy OB 346. He targeted the 7,046-ton freighter Pilar de Larrinaga. However, the gunners shot his starboard wing off and he crashed into the sea, killing all on board.

== Early life and career ==
Fliegel was born on 30 November 1907 in Wilmersdorf, a borough of Berlin, in the Kingdom of Prussia. He was the son of the son of geographer Gotthard Fliegel and his wife Anna Marie, née Meyer. Fliegel, who had three sisters, won his first bicycle race in 1926. In 1929, he won the German amateur sprint championship at the velodrome in Stettin-Westend. That year, he also participated in the UCI Track Cycling World Championships held in Zürich, Switzerland where he lost in the knockout stage to the Austrian August Schaffer.

Fliegel joined the military service in 1934 and transferred from the infantry of the Reichsheer (Army) to the newly emerging Luftwaffe (Air Force) of Nazi Germany a year later. Following his flight training, he served as flight instructor at the pilot schools A/B 42 in Salzwedel and A/B 113 in Brno. (Note: Flight training in the Luftwaffe progressed through the levels A1, A2 and B1, B2, referred to as A/B flight training. A training included theoretical and practical training in aerobatics, navigation, long-distance flights and dead-stick landings. The B courses included high-altitude flights, instrument flights, night landings and training to handle the aircraft in difficult situations.) There he was promoted to Hauptmann (captain) on 1 March 1939.

== World War II ==
World War II in Europe began on Friday, 1 September 1939, when German forces invaded Poland. Fliegel flew combat missions over Poland and received the Iron Cross 2nd Class (Eisernes Kreuz 2. Klasse) on 15 September 1939. In early May 1940 when I. Gruppe (1st group) of Kampfgeschwader 40 (KG 40—40th Bomber Wing), a unit equipped with the long-range Focke-Wulf Fw 200 "Condor" reconnaissance and anti-shipping/maritime patrol bomber aircraft, Fliegel was transferred to the 2. Staffel (2nd squadron) of KG 40. (Note: For an explanation of Luftwaffe unit designations see Organization of the Luftwaffe during World War II.) The unit initially operated against enemy shipping from airbases in Denmark. There he was awarded the Iron Cross 1st Class (Eisernes Kreuz 1. Klasse) on 13 May 1940.

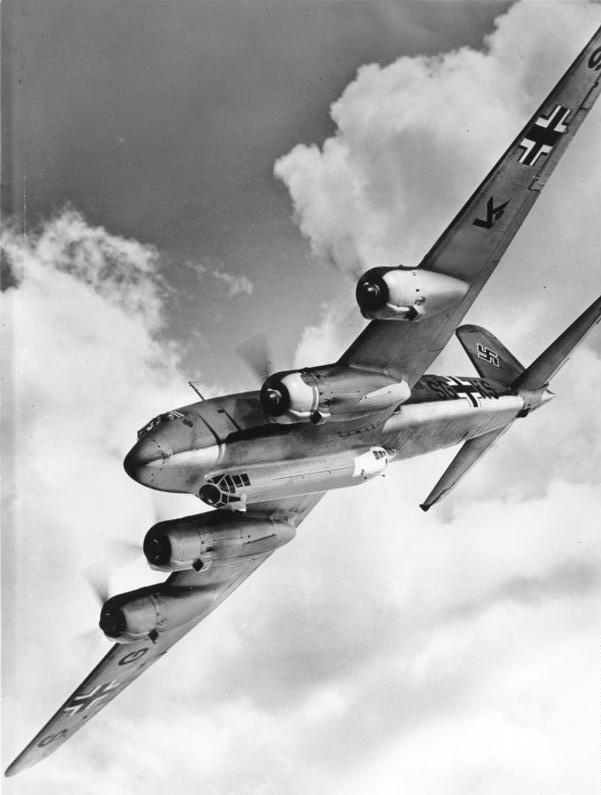
A Fw 200 C similar to those flown by Fliegel

In mid-1940, I. Gruppe relocated to the airbase Bordeaux-Mérignac at the Atlantic coast near Bordeaux in France. In October 1940, he was appointed Staffelkapitän (squadron leader) of 2. Staffel of KG 40. Flying the Fw 200 to its maximum range, I. Gruppe was credited with the destruction of 39 enemy merchant ships totaling 206,000 gross register tons (GRT), further damaging 20 ships of 115,000 GRT.

On 6 February 1941, U-37 under the command of Kapitänleutnant (Captain Lieutenant) Nicolai Clausen, spotted convoy HG 53, 19 merchant ships escorted by HMS Velox and Deptford, heading for Liverpool. Clausen reported the sighting, which was relayed to KG 40 by Fliegerführer Atlantik. On 9 February, KG 40 sent five Fw 200s to attack the convoy which was spotted at 4 pm roughly 640 kilometers (400 miles; 350 nautical miles) southwest of Lisbon. In the attack at 35°42′N 14°38′W, the Fw 200's managed to sink five ships (Britannic, Dagmar I, Jura, Tejo and Varna), and Deptford damaged the Fw 200 piloted by Oberleutnant (First Lieutenant) Erich Adam, who managed to fly his aircraft to Spain. U-37 sank three further ships from HG 53. This achievement earned him his first mention in the Wehrmachtbericht, an information bulletin and element of Nazi propaganda issued by the headquarters of the Wehrmacht.

Fliegel was awarded the Knight's Cross of the Iron Cross (Ritterkreuz des Eisernen Kreuzes) on 25 March 1941. In mid-April 1941 he was appointed Gruppenkommandeur (group commander) of I. Gruppe of KG 40, replacing Major Edgar Petersen. He was mentioned a second time in the Wehrmachtbericht on 20 June 1941 after the number of enemy shipping destroyed by his Gruppe increased by a further 24 ships, reaching 109 enemy ships sunk. By early 1941 I. Gruppe of KG 40 had five holders of the Knight's Cross of the Iron Cross reflecting the success of the Condors in Atlantic Ocean operations.

=== Killed in action ===
On 18 July 1941, Fliegel and his crew—copilot Leutnant (Second Lieutenant) Wolf-Dietrich Kadelke, first radio operator Oberfeldwebel (Staff Sergeant) Johannes Rottke, second radio operator Gefreiter (Airman) Karl Becker, flight engineer Unteroffizier (Sergeant) Johann Kothe and air gunner Unteroffizier Karl Meurer—were reported missing in action over the Atlantic in the vicinity northwest of Ireland. Their Fw 200 C-3 "F8+AB" (Werknummer 0043—factory number) was shot down in an attack on convoy OB 346. During the attack on the freighter Pilar de Larrinaga, the gunners on board the freighter scored a hit on the Fw 200's starboard wing which tore it off. At the time of his death, Fliegel was credited with seven ships sunk plus further six damaged. He was promoted to Major (major) posthumously.

== Awards ==
- Iron Cross (1939)
  - 2nd Class (15 September 1939)
  - 1st Class (13 May 1940)
- Knight's Cross of the Iron Cross on 25 March 1941 as Hauptmann and Gruppenkommandeur of the I./Kampfgeschwader 40
- Two named references in the Wehrmachtbericht (10 February 1941 and 20 June 1941)
