= April Underwood =

American businesswoman

April Underwood is an American venture capitalist and board director who was the chief product officer at Slack. She founded Adverb Ventures in 2023 with Jessica Verrilli. Before joining Slack, she held positions at Twitter, Google, and WeatherBill. She is a co-founder of #Angels, an angel investing collective for early-stage start-ups. She is a board director for Zillow Group and Eventbrite.

== Education ==
Underwood graduated from the University of Texas at Austin in 2001 with a BBA in information systems, and later received an MBA from the University of California, Berkeley. While at Berkeley, she completed an MBA internship at Apple.

== Career ==
Underwood has held various positions in the technology industry at companies including Intel, Deloitte, and Travelocity. She joined Google in 2007 as a senior partner technology manager, where she led content acquisition and monetization strategies. She then joined Twitter in 2010, where she was a product manager on features including the "tweet" and "follow" buttons, and led the creation of the Ads API. She also managed search partnerships with Microsoft, Yahoo, and Google, and directed Twitter's business development team. She was the director of product at Twitter when she left in 2015 to join Slack as the head of platform.

Underwood oversaw the product management, platform, research, and design teams at Slack. In 2015, she joined other women who currently or formerly worked at Twitter to create an investment group called #Angels. In September 2016, Underwood was named in Forbes list of "40 Under 40" influential businesspeople. In 2018 she became Slack's chief product officer. She left Slack in January 2019 to focus on #Angels full-time.
