= Xobni =

American software company

Xobni Corporation
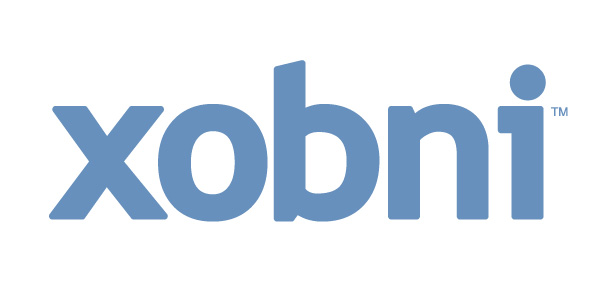
- Type: Private (venture-backed)
- Industry: Mobile and email applications
- Founded: March 2006
- Defunct: July 3, 2013
- Fate: Acquired by Yahoo!
- Headquarters: San Francisco, California, U.S.
- Key people: Jeff Bonforte, CEO; Adam M. Smith, Co-Founder; Matt Brezina, Co-Founder
- Website: www.xobni.com

Xobni (inbox spelled backwards; pronounced /ˈzɒbni/ ZOB-nee) was a San Francisco-based company that made software applications and services including products for Microsoft Outlook and mobile devices. It was founded in March 2006 by Adam Smith and Matt Brezina from Adam's dorm room in Cambridge, Massachusetts, as part of the Y Combinator summer founder's program. In late 2006, it relocated to San Francisco to be closer to Silicon Valley. It was acquired by Yahoo! in July 2013 for more than $60 million and shut down one year later.

== History ==
Xobni's first product, was announced for private beta testing on September 18, 2007, at the TechCrunch 40 conference. It offered search and people-based navigation of Microsoft Outlook email archives. The company hinted at plans to offer the same functionality for other email clients. When the Outlook product was first launched, it was called Xobni Insight, and was soon changed to Xobni for Outlook, or simply Xobni.

Xobni received mostly positive coverage, although initial versions had performance problems on large inboxes. Many users found that the pre-installed version of Xobni (and possibly the manually installed equivalent) could not be removed. Some anti-virus software has also flagged Xobni as malware.

In February 2008, Xobni hired Jeff Bonforte, a vice president at Yahoo! and founder of defunct I-drive, as their CEO. In the same month, Bill Gates gave a demo of Xobni at the Office Developers' Conference. This led to rumors of a US$20 million acquisition by Microsoft, which the company reportedly rejected.

The company opened its beta to the public on May 5, 2008, and garnered coverage from the Wall Street Journal, New York Times, CNET, Businessweek, CIO Magazine, and TechCrunch.

On July 3, 2013, Xobni announced that it had been acquired by Yahoo! for an undisclosed sum, Yahoo! incorporated many of Xobni's features into Yahoo Mail, and Xobni’s CEO Jeff Bonforte became one of CEO Marissa Mayer’s "top deputies, overseeing communications products". However, in July 2014, Xobni was among the slew of products that were closed down in order to focus on its "core experiences".

== Services ==
While the product was in beta, some questioned how Xobni planned to make money and the scope of their products. In July 2009, Xobni released a paid version of its product called Xobni Plus. Xobni Plus included advanced search, appointment search, the ability to search multiple PST archives, no ads, and one-year support. In 2010, the company added more revenue-generating products, including a service to share Xobni data across multiple devices, and gadgets that bring third-party data into Outlook. The company promoted an enterprise business to sell directly and through reseller partnerships; as well as a platform for developers to create gadgets to run within Xobni's sidebar in Outlook. Xobni announced localized versions of their Outlook product (free and paid) for the French and German markets in 2010. It announced its first for BlackBerry users in March 2010.

In September 2011, Xobni announced Smartr Inbox for Gmail and Smartr Contacts for Android. Smartr Contacts is a free app for the Android phone. Contacts are searchable and ranked by importance rather than alphabetically. Each profile has a photo, job title, company details, email history, common contacts and information from social networks. The app can be accessed on a phone home screen, via the main search bar, the widgets, or through the Smartr Contacts app. Lifehacker called Smartr Contacts for Android the "Best Address Book for the Android".

On January 24, 2012, Smartr Contacts for iPhone was released; one blog called it a "magic address book". The app identifies name and contact information for all contacts, including communication history and updates from Facebook, LinkedIn and Twitter. Lifehacker called Smartr Contacts for iPhone the "Best Address Book for iPhone".

== Funding ==
In March 2007, Xobni raised US$4.26 million from Vinod Khosla, First Round Capital, and Atomico, along with a number of angel investors including Ron Conway. In January, 2009, Xobni announced a $7 million B round of financing that added Cisco Systems and BlackBerry Partners Fund. On February 27, 2012, another round of about $10 million was announced.

== Difficulties ==
The initial releases of Xobni were criticized by tech bloggers and other journalists for stability and performance problems, as documented on the company's community forum. Other reviewers have criticized Xobni for monopolizing system resources, disabling other standard Outlook functionality like calendar appointments, and also deleting Outlook archives. Users have reported that these issues persist even in production (non-beta) versions. Some speculate these difficulties derive from engineering CPU and I/O intensive indexing on the closed source Microsoft Outlook platform, which has an extensive and heterogeneous deployment space with thousands of parameters to test. In 2008, blogger Om Malik wrote that the company would have to "raise gobs of additional money to fine-tune its product".

Since the initial release, the company received higher marks for the product's performance. Product reviews from CNET (5 stars) and PC Magazine (Editor's Choice) have expressed significantly improved performance and reliability with the Xobni for Outlook product. "Unlike many other Outlook add-ons, both free and upgraded versions of Xobni add functionality without greatly dragging down Outlook's performance." (CNET, 4/15/10)

With the release of the paid Xobni Plus product as of Xobni's 1.8 release, Xobni withdrew from its free version the capability to index multiple Outlook PST archives. Existing users still received this functionality in the free version, which led to some consternation among users of the free product.
