= Ali Rowghani =

Iranian-born American businessman (born 1973)

- Born: January 21, 1973 (age 53); Iran
- Education: Stanford University (B.A., M.B.A.)
- Occupation: COO of Twitter
- Employer: Twitter

Ali Rowghani (Persian: علی روغنی, born 21 January 1973) is an Iranian-born American businessman.

He was raised in Dallas, Texas, where he attended the St. Mark's School of Texas, graduating in 1991. He received his undergraduate degree from Stanford University in 1996, and his MBA from Stanford in 2002.

Rowghani worked in finance at Pixar for nine years, serving as Chief Financial Officer between 2002 and 2008. He helped with the restructuring of Disney Animation with the entrance of John Lasseter and Ed Catmull. In 2008, he left Pixar to become CFO for Twitter, a post he held for four years until he became Twitter's Chief operating officer. Steve Jobs attempted to dissuade him from joining Twitter. He left Twitter in 2014.

In November 2014, Rowghani joined Y Combinator as a part-time partner focusing on helping YC alumni scale their companies. He launched Continuity, a $700 million investment growth-stage fund, which was closed in 2015. He is now a managing partner of YC Continuity at Y Combinator.

== See also ==
- Notable alumni of St. Mark's School of Texas
