= Secret Cinema =

English entertainment company doing immersive events

- Founded: 2007; 19 years ago
- Founder: Fabien Riggall
- Headquarters: London, United Kingdom
- Owner: TodayTix (from Sept 2022)
- Website: www.secretcinema.org

Secret Cinema is a London-based entertainment company that specialises in immersive film and television events. Founded and created in 2007 by Fabien Riggall, it began with mystery screenings at initially undisclosed venues in London, including interactive performances in purpose-built sets.

It was purchased by TodayTix in September 2022.

== Events ==
In December 2011 the company held a one-off screening of The Third Man in Kabul to coincide with its London run of the film, which was shown simultaneously in both cities.

In July 2014 it showed Back to the Future in a life-size recreation of the 1950s Hill Valley town seen in the film. The first two Back to the Future dates were cancelled with only a few hours' notice and the company offered a full refund or exchange for the cost of tickets, but not for any booking fees; the opening dates of its 2013 production of Brazil had also been cancelled at short notice.

In December 2014 the company announced a secret film showing in response to Sony's withdrawal from the release of The Interview. Charlie Chaplin's The Great Dictator was simultaneously shown in Rome, London, New York, Los Angeles and San Francisco, in support of Article 19, a charity dedicated to the freedom of speech.

In March 2015 the company and its founder were criticised on Twitter and other publications for using unpaid actors; the company defended its practice and described the volunteers as interns who benefited from the experience.

In June 2015 it launched Star Wars: Empire Strikes Back, its biggest production to date. As part of the hundred shows that ran in London, a side-event at Alexandra Palace with musical guests DJ Yoda, Nightmares on Wax and Jamie Jones raised £11,000 for the Refugee Council. A further £29,000 was raised for the charity from the show. The production made it to the top ten UK box office for eleven weeks, generating a total of £6.45 million.

In September 2015 it said it would raise funds to bring free movie screenings to Syrian refugees in Europe, starting with the camp in Pas-de-Calais, France.

Secret Cinema made its first international expansion in 2019 bringing their Casino Royale project to Shanghai, after the London run became their most successful production with over 120,000 attendees and earnings surpassing £8 million.

In early 2020 Secret Cinema made a deal with Disney and Patwardhan Investments Ltd.

In May 2020, Secret Cinema moved its 2020 Dirty Dancing summer programme of immersive screenings to 2021, due to the COVID-19 pandemic. The company had proposed using the Low Hall sports ground in Walthamstow for the 3–month Dirty Dancing event. Local residents voiced concerns about COVID-19 transmission, noise pollution, the proximity of nature reserves, the cost of tickets, and the loss of the playing field to residents. The Independent described the company's predominant problem to be its entry cost, going up to £75 for large-scale productions such as The Empire Strikes Back. Riggall countered that his productions were comparable to West End theatre shows rather than other cinema showings, and priced accordingly.

In November 2021, the company, with Netflix and Riot Games, offered a role-playing experience based on the Netflix Arcane series in Los Angeles, California.

=== Charity work ===
The company selects a charity as a partner for each production, based on the theme of the film. The Secret Cinema Web site stated in June 2021 that its charity programme had raised over £130,000 since 2015; the same claim was made as of September 2025.

In August 2014, after the death of Robin Williams, it held a charity screening of Dead Poets Society, with proceeds donated to Mind, a mental health charity. Money has been raised for charities including Save the Children; the National Alliance on Mental Illness; Refugee Council; and MAC UK, a local Camden charity which provides mental health services to disadvantaged youth.

== Sale ==
A controlling interest – over 75% of the voting rights in the holding company, Secret Group Limited – was sold to Todaytix Production Holdings Limited on 22 September 2022.
