= Jordan Fliegel =

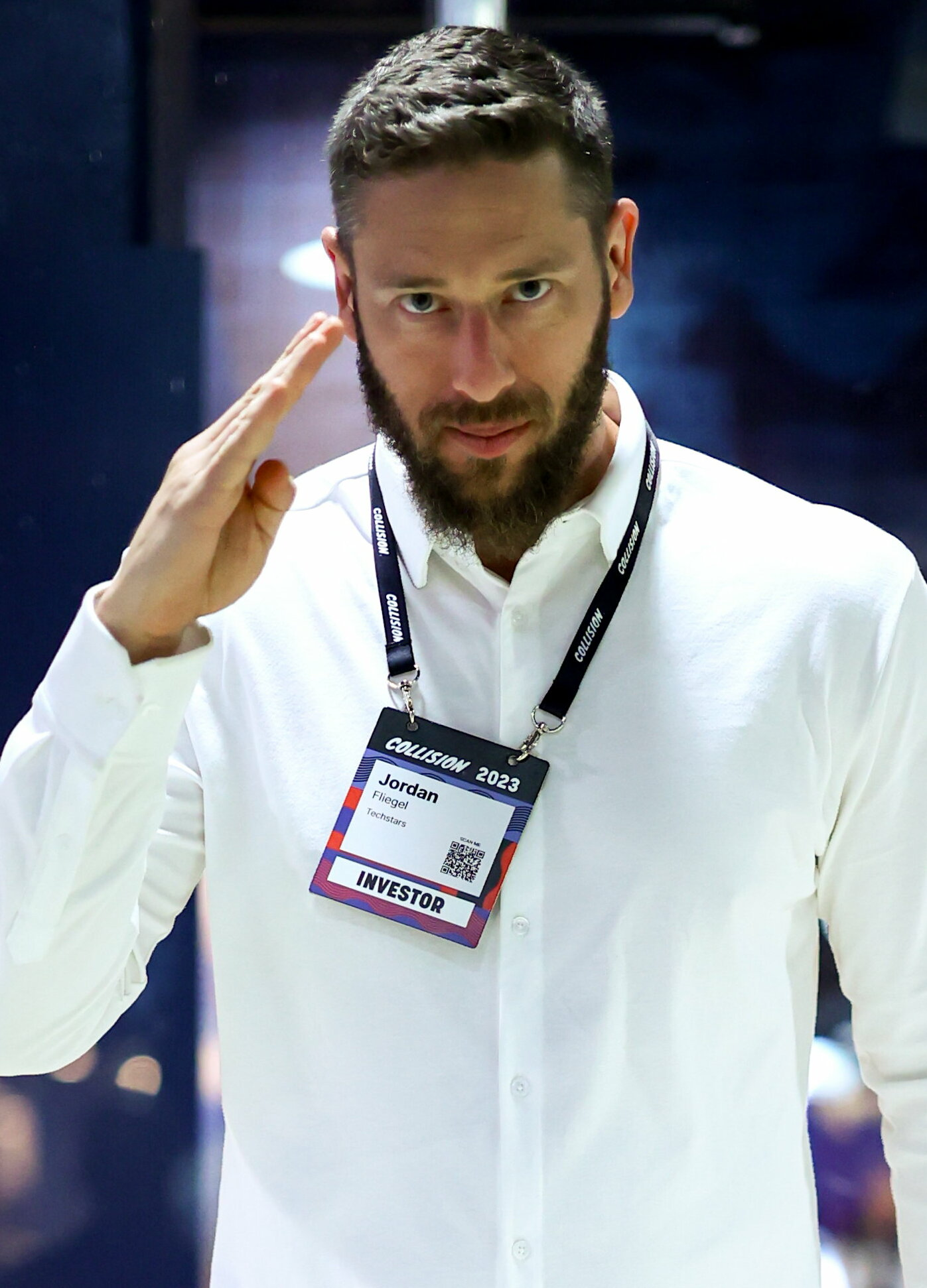
- Fliegel in 2023
- Born: Cambridge, Massachusetts
- Occupations: entrepreneur and investor
- Title: Shareholder Ventures (CEO)

Jordan Fliegel (born 1986) is an American/Israeli entrepreneur and investor.

Fliegel is currently CEO of Acquisition Lab, an investment firm that helps Acquisition Entrepreneurs acquire SMBs. He serves on several Board of Directors including Oyster Enterprises II Acquisition Corp (Nasdaq: OYSEU), a $253M SPAC, and is a member of the Entrepreneurs Council at the Center for American Entrepreneurship.

Fliegel was previously managing director of the Techstars Sports Accelerator in Indianapolis, which he launched in 2019, and the Techstars NYC Accelerator. Through the two accelerators Fliegel invested in 93 startups from 2019 to 2024. Fliegel was previously co-founder and Managing Partner of Founders First, an angel fund and syndicate with 250+ portfolio companies.

Fliegel was co-CEO of Draft.com ("DRAFT"), a venture-backed fantasy sports company headquartered in NYC. In 2017, he sold DRAFT for $48M to Paddy Power Betfair. Fliegel was Founder and CEO of sports coaching company CoachUp.com, backed by $14M in venture-capital and headquartered in Boston. NBA MVP Stephen Curry is Fliegel's partner. Fliegel is currently Chairman of CoachUp, and led the company's last internal $1.5M round of funding.

Fliegel and his companies were named to Inc 5000, and awarded Inc “30 under 30”, Forbes "30 under 30", BBJ “40 under 40”, Finalist for Ernst & Young “New England Entrepreneur of the Year” and Sports Business Journal SportsTech Power Player.

Fliegel is a former professional basketball player for Hapoel Jerusalem, and former professional basketball team co-owner of the ANBL 4X Champion New Zealand Breakers. Fliegel writes and lecturers on entrepreneurship, investing, and leadership , and is the author of "Coaching Up!" (Wiley & Sons, 2016) with a foreword by NBA & NCAA champion Shane Battier."

== Early life ==
Fliegel grew up in Cambridge, Massachusetts. He is the grandson of former professional basketball player Bernie Fliegel and godson of Guido Goldman, founder of the German Marshall Fund. He attended Cambridge Rindge & Latin School where he played basketball. He graduated from Bowdoin College, with a double major in Government & Legal Studies and Philosophy, and a minor in history. As a Senior he won the Jefferson Davis Book Award, Bowdoin's top prize for academic achievement in Government & Legal Studies.

== Collegiate basketball ==
Fliegel played collegiate basketball at Bowdoin College. As a 3-year starter and co-captain, he earned Team MVP, All-league, All-state, All-New England, and Jewish Sports Review All-American honors while leading Bowdoin to a 22–7 record (best in school history), the NESCAC Championship game, and the 2nd round of the Men's NCAA Division III Tournament.

== Professional basketball ==
Fliegel played Professional Basketball for Hapoel Migdal Jerusalem in the Israeli Premier and Eurocup Basketball League, and for Hapoel Kfar Saba in the Israeli National League for 2 seasons (from 2008 to 2010).

== Business ==
Fliegel went from professional basketball to business school, where he earned an MBA from Tel Aviv University. He then founded CoachUp, a venture-backed startup operating a website connecting athletes with sports coaches. CoachUp has been covered in outlets such as the Wall Street Journal, USA Today, the Boston Globe, and the Huffington Post.
