= Box, Inc. =

Cloud content management program

- Company type: Public
- Website type: Content management; File sharing
- Traded as: NYSE: BOX; S&P 600 component
- Headquarters: Redwood City, California, U.S.
- Founders: Aaron Levie; Dylan Smith
- Key people: Bethany Mayer (chairman); Aaron Levie (CEO); Dylan Smith (CFO)
- Revenue: ▲US$1.09 billion (2024)
- Operating income: ▲US$79.6 million (2024)
- Net income: ▲US$202 million (2024)
- Total assets: ▲US$1.67 billion (2024)
- Total equity: ▲US$−297 million (2024)
- Employees: 2,810 (2024)
- Website: box.com
- Launched: 2005; 21 years ago (as Box.net) in Mercer Island, Washington, U.S.
- ASN: 33011
- Financials as of January 31, 2025.

Box, Inc. (formerly Box.net) is an American public company based in Redwood City, California. It develops and markets cloud-based content management, collaboration, and file sharing tools for businesses. Box was founded in 2005 by Aaron Levie and Dylan Smith. Initially, it focused on consumers, but around 2009 and 2010 Box pivoted to focus on business users. The company raised about $500 million over numerous funding rounds before going public in 2015. Its software allows users to store and manage files in an online folder system accessible from any device. Users can then comment on the files, share them, apply workflows, and implement security and governance policies.

== History ==
The idea for Box.com started in 2003 with Aaron Levie, a business student at the University of Southern California. He wrote a paper on the industry for storing digital files online and started developing the Box service in 2004. In 2005, Levie dropped out of school to work on Box full-time with long-time friend and cofounder Dylan Smith. Initially, the software was developed in the attic of Smith's parents' house, then in a garage owned by Levie's uncle that had been converted into a living space. Levie and Smith were joined by cofounders Jeff Queisser and Sam Ghods. The founders relied on their own money as well as support from friends and family members until Mark Cuban invested $350,000 in seed funding in 2005.

The Box service was released in 2005. In the first year after its release, the company's revenue was tens of thousands of dollars. It raised $1.5 million in series A funding in 2006 and $6 million in Series B funding in 2008. Box's revenues grew 500% from 2008 to 2009. By 2010, the company had raised $29.5 million in funding and the service had four million users.

Box was initially focused on consumers, but many of those consumers used the service at work. Box pivoted to focus on business users around 2009 and 2010. The company developed features to embed Box in common business applications or use APIs to integrate with them. In 2011, a reworked version of the Box service was released with technical improvements designed for handling large numbers of business users, changes to the user interface, and more collaboration features. The company started developing its first industry-specific features for heavily regulated industries in 2012, when it introduced tools for HIPAA compliance at healthcare organizations.

Box also expanded internationally, with offices in London, Berlin, and Tokyo, among other locations. In 2011, the company raised $48 million in funding to support its data centers. This was followed by an additional $125 million in funding round the next year, $100 million in 2013, and $150 million in 2014.

In March 2012, Box purchased the domain "Box.com" and rebranded from "Box.net" after its company name change from Box.net to Box Inc.

On January 23, 2015, Box became a public company via an initial public offering on the New York Stock Exchange. Box moved its headquarters to its current location in Redwood City, California in January 2016. In July 2018, Box acquired search engine company Butter.ai. In 2019, hedge fund Starboard Value took a 7.5% stake in the company.

In May 2020, Box announced a new version with improved integration with videotelephony software, as well as a feature called Collections that allows users to customize their personal folder structure due to the increase in remote work during the COVID-19 pandemic.

In April 2021, Box announced that it had accepted a $500 million investment from KKR, a private equity firm.

In August 2024, Box and Slack announced an expanded partnership that introduced secure AI capabilities to enterprise content management.

== Acquisitions ==
Box acquired Increo Solutions, which developed software for previewing and collaborating on digital files, in October 2009.

In 2013, the company acquired dLoop, Folder iOS, an application designed for storage, file management, and sharing, and Crocodoc.

In June 2014, the Y Combinator-backed company Streem was acquired for an undisclosed amount. Later that year, in October, Box acquired MedXT, a medical software developer, for $3.84 million.

Verold, a cloud-based 3D model editor and viewer for the web and mobile devices, was acquired in 2015, along with Subspace, a company specializing in BYOD security for mobile devices, and AirPost, a startup that helps detect and manage cloud application usage.

The company acquired Wagon Analytics in August 2016.

Butter.ai, a search engine company, and Progressly were acquired in July 2018.

In February 2021, Box acquired Tervela for a reported $14.8 million and e-signature startup SignRequest for $55 million.

Box announced in January 2024 that it had acquired Crooze, a content management app maker, for an undisclosed amount. In August of that same year, the company announced it had acquired Alphamoon, a Polish-based startup specializing in intelligent document processing.

== Features ==
A screenshot of Box.com's mobile user interface

Box.com is a cloud-based content management system with collaboration, security, analytics and other features related to files and information. There is a core Box service, then add-ons for different industries and situations. Box is used to manage, share, and collaborate on digital files. As of 2017, there are about 41 million users, constituting 6.5% of the market for software that helps manage, share, and collaborate on digital files.

Box stores files in an online folder system that can be accessed from any device with an internet connection. Often, a copy of the files is also stored on the user's devices, then synchronized with the online version. Users can invite "collaborators" that can upload or modify files or the user can share specific files or folders. Users can also create certain files directly in Box.com and add comments or notes that are visible from the folder system.

Box began as a simple service for storing, sharing, and syncing files among different users and devices, but developed over time into an enterprise product with features for security and compliance. Each user has access to their own documents, as well as to corporate files that the IT department manages. IT staff can also set other access and security policies, get audit information like who accessed what files, and receive alerts for suspicious downloads. Box's open APIs allow it to integrate with common business applications. For example, one integration allows users to save files to their Box.com folders directly from Microsoft applications. The company also provides consulting, support, and other services.

Box held its first annual conference, BoxWorks, in January 2010, initially under the name Altitude. The first conference drew about 300 attendees, but grew to about 3,000 by 2013.

== See also ==
- Comparison of file hosting services
- Comparison of file synchronization software
- Comparison of online backup services
