= Motorway (brand) =

British used car marketplace

- Type: Limited company
- Industry: Automotive Industry
- Founded: 2017
- Founders: Tom Leathes; Harry Jones; Alex Buttle
- Headquarters: London, United Kingdom
- Area served: United Kingdom
- Number of employees: 450+ (2026)
- Website: motorway.co.uk

Motorway is a British used car marketplace that enables private sellers to sell their vehicles directly to car dealers through daily online auctions. The platform does not offer used car listings or direct purchase options for consumers, unlike some other UK used car operators.

The company is headquartered in London and also has offices in Brighton. In 2021, the company was valued at over $1 billion for the first time. By 2023, it was processing £2.2 billion a year in used car sales.

== History ==
Motorway was co-founded in July 2017 by Tom Leathes, Alex Buttle and Harry Jones, who had previously created Top10, a broadband and mobile deal comparison site that was acquired by uSwitch in 2010.

Following an angel round of £500,000, Motorway launched in July 2017. The company subsequently raised £2.75 million at seed level funding, with investors including LocalGlobe, a seed stage venture firm founded by Robin Klein and Marchmont Ventures (founded by Momondo and Cheapflights CEO Hugo Burge).

The brand raised a further £11 million in Series A funding in 2019, with investors again led by Marchmont Ventures and LocalGlobe. This brought the company's total funding up to £14.3 million.

The founders announced in January 2020 that the service was receiving over 100,000 enquiries per month.

During the COVID-19 pandemic, Motorway was forced to stop trading in March 2020 following the UK national lockdown. Trading resumed in May 2020 with contact-free transport to align with social distancing rules.

By June 2020, Motorway reported £1.39m in used car sales on the platform per day.

In June 2021, Motorway raised £48m in Series B funding led by Index Ventures, BMW i Ventures and Unbound. At funding completion, Danny Rimer, partner at Index Ventures, joined Motorway’s board.

In October 2021, Motorway announced its recent financial results to Bloomberg News, revealing $1 billion of sales expected in 2021, with $2 billion projected for the following year.

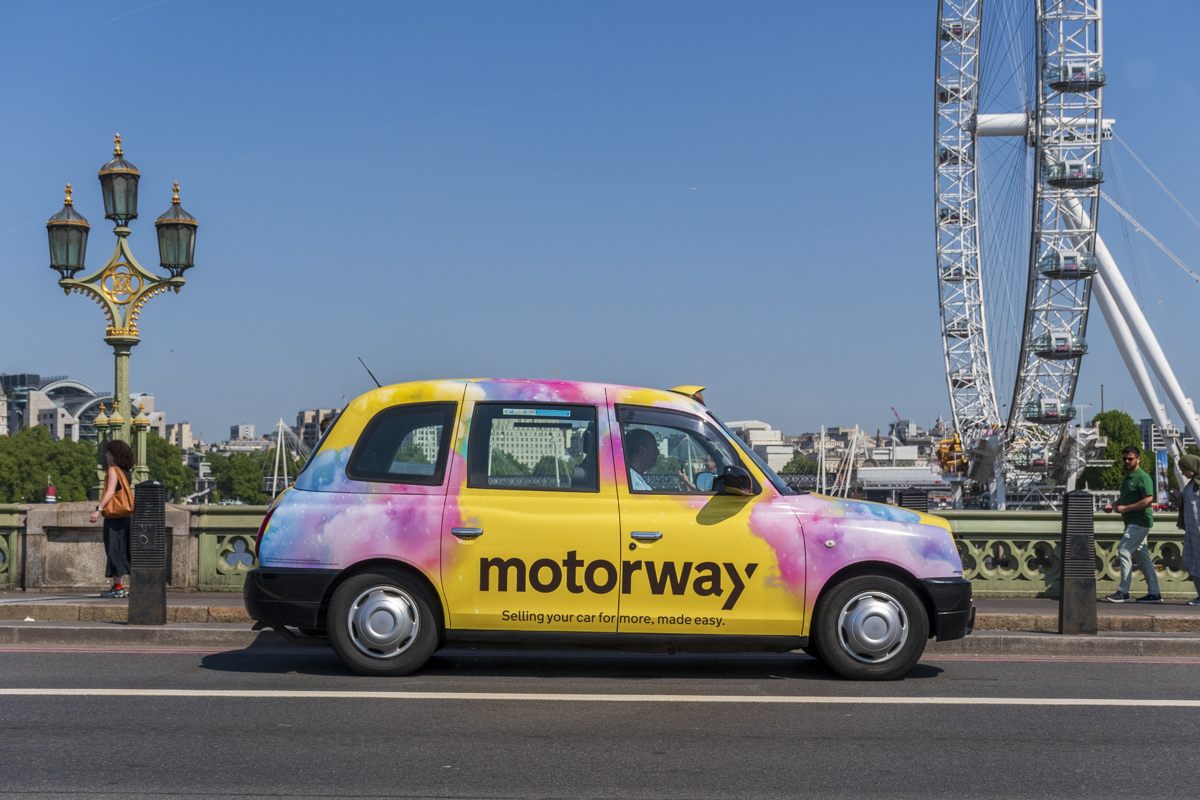
British taxi with Motorway advertising

In November 2021, Motorway raised $190m in a Series C funding round co-led by Index Ventures and ICONIQ Growth, valuing the business at over $1bn and seeing the company become a unicorn startup. The press went on to report that by mid-2022, they had started selling more than 1,000 cars a day.

In February 2023, articles in car trade press revealed that Motorway reached £1.7bn ($2.1bn) in used car sales in 2022, doubling its annual revenue year-on-year. In May 2023, coverage in dealer press publications revealed that Motorway had launched Motorway Pay to its dealer network, an industry-first payments service to save time and reduce money transfer issues when dealers buy vehicles privately.

During the same year it also acquired Total Car Check (TCC), a UK-based car checking service. The check allows for information to be found about any used car, covering various categories. It was suggested the acquisition would allow Motorway to offer more thorough used car checks as standard, reducing potential issues in their auction process.

At the end of 2023, Motorway announced one of its largest sponsorship deals to date, signing a two-year deal with TNT Sports as the sponsor of its football coverage.

In 2024, Business Leader stated that Motorway handled £2.2bn ($2.82bn) worth of transactions in 2023. In the same year the company reported revenue had increased to £66 million for 23/24 financial year. The firm's sales also grew substantially during this period, topping £2 billion in sales volume for the first time. According to City A.M., Motorway saw a total of £2.2 billion in sales transactions for the year in 2023. In October 2024, London Loves Business reported that Motorway's revenues had increased by 48% over the previous twelve months, based on the company's most recently filed accounts.

In 2025, Motorway underwent a major rebrand, increasing its emphasis on how the B2C used car sale model it used was easier for the consumer than other used car sale techniques. In much of the marketing material it used in the rollout of this new branding, it frequently used "effortless" or similar terms to define the ease of selling cars through its platform. This aligned with industry reports that suggested consumers often had poor experiences when selling cars via traditional sale methods. Le Capital announced a partnership with Motorway in October 2025 to held streamline the funding process for dealerships that use the Motorway platform to purchase cars. Motorway renewed its sponsorship of TNT Sports in 2025, with idents starring ex-footballer and commentator Ally McCoist.

In January 2026, Car Dealer Magazine reported on Motorway’s filed 2024 accounts and 2025 outlook. The company reported revenues of £66.4m in 2024 and projected revenues of £78m for 2025, an 18% increase, alongside a reduction in operating losses. Motorway stated it expected to reach profitability in 2026. The company also surpassed two major milestones, selling half a million cars on its platform while also receiving 100,000 excellent-rated reviews on TrustPilot. It also launched an AI profiling tool in April 2026. The company partnered with bereavement experts Empathy in 2026, which allowed the company to simplify vehicle sales from deceased estates. As part of this solution, it would assist sellers with understanding required paperwork in selling a vehicle from an estate.

== Research ==
In January 2018, Motorway released a report on diesel prices, showing the value of diesel vehicles had declined by 5% in 2017, compared to a 10% price increase in petrol car prices. Some diesel cars fell in value by 26.3%. The figures were linked with taxes on diesel vehicles, introduced that year by the UK government. A new study in 2019 found that used diesel cars had declined in value by 10.3% over the last two years.

The company also launched a major investigation into the “price chipping” practices used by second-hand car dealers and online car buyers. The research showed that the price consumers were offered online was higher than the amount they actually received, with the average drop across all companies surveyed being 6%. Cars valued under £5,000 could be “chipped down” by as much as 11%.

== Platform ==
Motorway's website is a two-sided marketplace platform for private car-selling customers and verified dealers who buy cars from them.

The customer portal allows users to receive a vehicle valuation by sharing their car registration and mileage. Motorway provides this figure based on the data from its own marketplace and current market trends. When the car is listed on Motorway's sales platform, verified dealers can place their bids. The car is then collected for delivery to the dealership which makes the highest bid.

The dealer portal is restricted to professional car dealers. Dealers become notified of cars that suit their requirements once they become available, and place offers in a daily online sale. When dealers purchase vehicles, they can arrange collection with the company's end-to-end transportation service, Motorway Move, and purchase with Motorway Pay, the company's real time point-of-purchase payment platform.

=== Additional services ===
In 2023, the automative service provider launched Motorway Pay, its first secure online wallet. It allows dealers to pre-load money into the wallet and then release the money instantly to complete transactions. Around the same period of time it launched Motorway Move, a transport option for dealers who needed cars to be collected and delivered to them.

=== Technology & AI ===
Motorway began to invest heavily in technology, which includes automated checks and technology that would streamline the process of buying or selling a car on its platform. In 2021, it launched its RPM vehicle-pricing tool which has been used by over 8 million customers in the UK. Most recently, this included the launch of its seller verification tool, which would ensure that the sellers have the right to sell the vehicle in question.

== Awards ==
- Used Car Product of the Year—Car Dealer Magazine, Used Car Awards 2019;
- IT Innovation of the Year, Retail & Wholesale—Motor Trader Industry Awards 2020;
- Used Car Product of the Year—Car Dealer Magazine, Used Car Awards 2020;
- Product Innovation of the Year—Car Dealer Magazine, Power Awards 2021;
- Used Online Car Trading Platform of the Year—Motor Trader Awards 2021;
- Used Online Car Trading Platform of the Year—Motor Trader Awards 2022
- Deloitte UK Technology Fast 50 - 2022
- Stock Acquisition Provider of the Year—Car Dealer Magazine, Power Awards 2023
- FT1000: Europe’s Fastest Growing Companies 2023
- Used Online Car Trading Platform of the Year—Motor Trader Awards 2023
- Stock Acquisition Provider of the Year—Car Dealer Magazine, Power Awards 2024
- Sunday Times 100 Tech 2025
- Consumer to Trade Stock Acquisition Platform 2025—Car Dealer Magazine, Power Awards 2025
- Consumer to Trade Stock Acquisition Platform 2026—Car Dealer Magazine, Power Awards 2026

== Advertising ==
Motorway's first TV advert was shown in May 2019 and was aired across commercial TV until the end of that year. In August 2021, Motorway launched a nationwide marketing campaign, with a TV ad airing across all major UK commercial channels. In January 2022, Motorway announced it was the sponsor of ITV's Six Nations Championship rugby coverage across 2022 and 2023. This sponsorship continued into 2024 and 2025. In July 2022, Motorway announced it was the sponsor of BT Sport's broadcast coverage across 2022 and 2023 of the Premier League and UEFA Europa League.

In August 2023, Motorway announced it was the sponsor of TNT Sports (United Kingdom)'s broadcast coverage of the Premier League and the UEFA Europa League. In March 2025, Motorway launched a comprehensive brand refresh developed with TwentyFirstCenturyBrand and a new ad campaign with creative led by Uncommon.

== See also ==
- Car dealership
- Used cars
