= Agoda =

Singaporean online travel agency

Agoda Company Pte.
- Company type: Subsidiary
- Website type: Travel and accommodation
- Founded: 2005; 21 years ago
- Headquarters: Singapore and Thailand
- Area served: Global
- Founders: Robert Rosenstein (co-founder); Michael Kenny (co-founder)
- Key people: Omri Morgenshtern (CEO); John Wroughton Brown (chairman); Idan Zalzberg (CTO); Damien Pfirsch (CCO); Thi-Mai-Linh Bui (CFO)
- Products: Travel agency Metasearch engine
- Parent: Booking Holdings
- Website: www.agoda.com

Agoda.com is a Southeast Asian online travel agency that facilitates reservations for lodging, flights, ground transportation, and activities. It is a subsidiary of Booking Holdings, together with Priceline, KAYAK.

== History ==
Agoda was co-founded in 2005 by American school friends Michael Kenny and Robert Rosenstein. Kenny had previously launched Phuket-based PlanetHoliday.com and PrecisionReservations.com, which were incorporated into Agoda.

In 2007, Agoda was acquired by Booking Holdings, formerly The Priceline Group.

Agoda launched iOS and Android mobile apps in July 2011.

After Booking Holdings acquired Israel-based startup Qlika in 2014, the Qlika team joined Agoda to automate and scale its marketing systems.

In November 2014, the company opened a research center in Tel Aviv.

In May 2016, Booking Holdings acquired Taipei-based startup WooMoo, the creator of POP, a mobile app that focused on prototyping. Its team relocated to Bangkok.

In May 2018, CEO and co-founder Rob Rosenstein became the chairman of Agoda and a strategic advisor to Booking Holdings. John Wroughton Brown, the COO, was promoted to CEO, with Chief Product Officer Omri Morgenshtern, who joined the company as part of the Qlika acquisition, named as the new COO.

In November 2018, Agoda launched airport transfers via a partnership with Mozio.

In September 2019, Agoda launched a brand refresh including a new logo, custom font, and cartoon mascots called Agojis based on the circles in the logo.

In October 2019, Agoda began offering flight bookings.

In November 2019, Agoda launched B2B products including a white-label platform.

In May 2020, Agoda announced the layoffs of 1,500 people due to the COVID-19 pandemic.

In June 2022, John Brown resigned as CEO, and was succeeded by chief product officer Omri Morgenshtern.

In January 2026, Agoda partnered with Mastercard to enable travel bookings through loyalty programmes.

== Legal and regulatory issues ==
=== Illegal and unregistered hotels ===
In April 2017, the Tourism Minister of Thailand called for travel agencies, most notably Agoda, to delete illegal and unregistered hotels from the platforms.

In June 2018, Agoda cooperated with the Taipei City Government's request to remove illegal and unregistered Taipei hotels from its listings.

=== Unfair competition allegations in Turkey ===
In September 2018, Agoda was one of 20 online travel agencies that faced legal action from the Turkish Travel Agencies Association due to alleged unfair competition. In January 2026, regulators in Turkey filed a lawsuit seeking to ban Agoda as well as many other travel agencies including Airbnb and Expedia.

=== Misleading discount claims in UK ===
In October 2017, Agoda was one of six major online travel agencies that was subject to a probe by the Competition and Markets Authority in the United Kingdom. The probe was related to "concerns about hidden charges, pressure selling tactics, misleading discount claims and the order in which results appear on the site pages." The companies agreed to stop engaging in such misleading tactics.

=== Delayed refund to customer after booking a non-existent hotel ===
In December 2017, Agoda initially refused to give a refund to a customer that booked a non-existent hotel. The refund was paid after a fraud complaint was filed with the Thai government.

=== Issues with booking systems ===
In 2019, in Asia, Agoda still listed several hotels that had already terminated their listings with Agoda.

In Japan, in the summer of 2025, regulatory authorities, including the Japan Tourism Agency, criticized the company after customers cited booking hotels that were not available and reservations cancelled by the Agoda system, while hotel suppliers had problems with confirming reservations, discrepancies in reservation details, and rooms being sold at significantly higher prices than those set by the hotels. The company took steps to mitigate the issues; however, hotels continued to have issues with incorrect reservations in August 2025. According to an independent survey of 500 users conducted by Nikkei and published in August 2025, about 20% of Agoda users have experienced some sort of trouble, such as "the hotel they thought they had booked was not actually reserved", "their reservation was canceled without consent", or "the airline ticket did not match the conditions at the time of purchase". Furthermore, about half of those who consulted Agoda about such issues were simply told to handle the matter themselves.

=== NDA clauses in severance packages ===
In September 2025, Agoda laid off approximately 50 Singapore employees with severance benefits and, in violation of local laws, included clauses in severance agreements prohibiting contact with government agencies or trade unions, with penalties of revoked severance benefits if breached. Following strong condemnation from the Ministry of Manpower and National Trades Union Congress, Agoda apologized, acknowledging the clauses were "inappropriate". These actions were rebuked by the National Trades Union Congress (NTUC) and the Singapore Industrial and Services Employees' Union (SISEU). After meetings with unions and regulators, the company apologized and provided further clarification to affected individuals.
