= Cheryl Sew Hoy =

Entrepreneur, speaker and angel investor

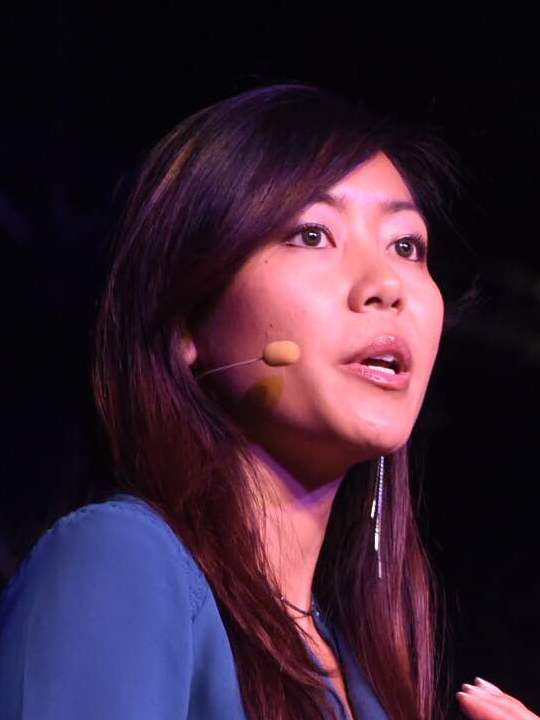
- Born: Cheryl Yeoh; 31 May 1983 (age 43); Malaysia
- Other name: Cheryl Sew Hoy (married name)
- Education: Cornell University
- Occupations: Entrepreneur and speaker
- Years active: 2010-present
- Known for: Founding CEO of the Malaysian Global Innovation and Creativity Centre (MaGIC), Advisor & Co-founder of #MovingForward, and Founder & CEO of Tiny Health
- Notable work: Co-founder of Reclip.It, acquired by Walmart Labs in 2013
- Spouse: Jason Sew Hoy
- Children: 2

Cheryl Sew Hoy (née Yeoh; born 31 May 1983) is an entrepreneur, speaker and angel investor, best known for being the founding CEO of the Malaysian Global Innovation and Creativity Centre (MaGIC), a government-funded agency to support entrepreneurship in Malaysia and ASEAN.

She co-founded Reclip. It, which was acquired by Walmart Labs in 2013. Sew Hoy served as an independent non-executive director of Flexiroam Limited, an Australia-based telecommunications company from 2016 to 2018. She is currently an entrepreneur-in-residence at Silicon Valley Bank, and an advisor to various startups including blockchain infrastructure company Tendermint, the team that built Cosmos Network and Kenzie Academy.

Sew Hoy has been credited with helping put Malaysia and its startups on the world map. In 2012, Sew Hoy was named "Top 44 Female Founders Every Entrepreneur Should Know" by Mashable.

Sew Hoy is the founder of the #MovingForward campaign which encourages VCs to commit to a diverse, inclusive and harassment-free workplace. She was listed as one of Time magazine's persons of the year in 2017, as a "Silence Breaker", who spoke out against sexual harassment in the workplace.

== Early life and education ==
Born and raised in Petaling Jaya, Malaysia, Yeoh is the eldest daughter of Audrey Chan and Allen Yeoh. She was a valedictorian at Seaport High School and went on to receive a full scholarship from the Public Service Department of Malaysia (JPA) to study in United States when she was 18 years old.

She received a Bachelor of Science degree in operations research and industrial engineering from Cornell University (Ithaca, New York). At Cornell, she was inducted into the Sphinx Head secret honor society. She was known at Cornell, for being the chaperon to Sage Chapel for four years and for her efforts in introducing the labyrinth concept to the university for students' psychological and health benefits. She subsequently received the Lester Knight scholarship to pursue her master's degree in engineering management at Cornell.

== Career ==
=== CityPockets ===
In 2010, Sew Hoy and her co-founder founded her first start-up CityPockets, the very first digital wallet and secondary marketplace for daily deals. CityPockets was among seven startups selected to participate in an accelerator in North Carolina called LaunchBox Digital.

Some users called CityPockets the "mint.com and ebay for daily deals." The technology supported over 50 of the top daily deal sites including Groupon, Living Social, BuyWithMe, Gilt City, Bloomspot, Google Offers, Restaurant.com and Zozi. CityPockets was featured prominently in many news and media sites including Fox News, ABC7, CNN, The Wall Street Journal, Forbes, Netted by the Webbys, TechCrunch, GigaOm, AllThingsD, Lifehacker, CNET, Mashable, and TheNextWeb.

At the beginning of Sew Hoy's startup journey, she was known to be a scrappy startup entrepreneur where she crashed in a friend's living room futon for 5 months and put herself on a "kale and quinoa" diet in order to maintain a food budget of $35 a week. Sew Hoy eventually raised $770,000 from venture capitalists and angel investors in New York in 2011.

=== Reclip.It (acquired by Walmart Labs) ===
When the daily deal space started consolidating, Sew Hoy shut down CityPockets and pivoted the company to launch Reclip.It in 2012. Reclip.It is a personalized list-making app featuring weekly ads and digital coupons from top retail stores like Walmart, Macy's, Walgreens, Target, BestBuy, Home Depot, CVS, etc. Reclip. It was selected by InStyle magazine as "2012 Best of the Web," mentioned as the #1 tool to Shop Smarter on Daily Tekk, and also featured on TechCrunch, Huffington Post, Fast Company, USA Today, Xconomy, and Forbes.

In Spring of 2013, Reclip.It was acquired by Walmart Labs. While the sale amount was not disclosed, Sew Hoy was reported by the media to be one of nine self-made women millionaires who are making a difference to the US economy. The startup had previously received funding from 500 Startups, Great Oaks Venture Capital and angel investors in Silicon Valley and New York, bringing the total funding to just over $1 million.

=== Malaysian Global Innovation and Creativity Centre (MaGIC) ===
In April 2014, Sew Hoy was headhunted by the government of Malaysia and appointed CEO of the Malaysian Global Innovation and Creativity Centre (MaGIC), leaving her career in Silicon Valley to return to Malaysia and contribute to her home country. MaGIC was given an initial grant of US$21.4 million and was launched by former President Barack Obama and Malaysian's former Prime Minister Najib Razak on 27 April 2014.

In her time at MaGIC, Sew Hoylaunched programs such as the Malaysia Accelerator Program (MAP), bringing together startups across ASEAN, 500Startups' Distro Dojo, the MaGIC Academy and also inked a three-year partnership with Stanford University and Techstars, where she created immersive programs as a bridge for entrepreneurs in Southeast Asia to be exposed to the Silicon Valley startup ecosystem.

MaGIC's Board of Directors include Mark Chang (Founder of Jobstreet), Khailee Ng (Managing Partner of 500Startups), Sajith Sivanandan (managing director of Google Malaysia, Vietnam, Philippines and New Emerging Markets), and Tan Sri Jamaludin Ibrahim (Axiata Group CEO and President).

Sew Hoy announced that she was stepping down from her position at MaGIC in January 2016.

== Other work and ventures ==
Sew Hoy previously mentored at The Founder Institute and The Thiel Fellowship on product management, building teams, fundraising, marketing & operations.

In 2015, Sew Hoy invested in BloomThis, a startup in Southeast Asia. Sew Hoy is also an investor and advisor for NEXT Academy, a coding school based in Malaysia that received US$300,000 in 2016 as seed investment from 500 Startups to focus on educational technology.

Sew Hoy is frequently invited to speak at global conferences and has spoken in the UK, Croatia, Hungary, Australia, Japan, India and Hong Kong. She recently spoke at the Global Entrepreneurship Summit (GES) 2016 in Silicon Valley alongside President Barack Obama and Mark Zuckerberg. In 2015, Sew Hoy represented Malaysia in a debate for Innovation Awards & Summit by The Economist in Hong Kong. Sew Hoy was a keynote speaker for 7th World Chinese Economic Forum held in London, United Kingdom in 2015. In December 2013, Sew Hoy delivered a TEDxKL speech titled "Success begets passion, not the other way around."

In February 2016, Sew Hoy moved back to San Francisco, California, and was the chief marketing officer of Hack Reactor based in San Francisco, before they were acquired by Galvanized. She also served as an independent non-executive director of Flexiroam Limited, an Australia-based telecommunications company from 2016 to 2018, angel invests and advises tech companies through her consulting work.

As an immigrant to the United States, Sew Hoy is an avid supporter of immigration reform as a way to boost economic growth and create jobs for Americans.

== Awards ==
In August 2016, Sew Hoy won the Best Social Media Influencer Award by Malaysian Rice Bowl Startup Award, and has been included on various lists recognizing her achievements by publications and universities, including Prestige Malaysia's Top 40 under 40, the Golden Globe Tiger Awards in 2015 for Women Leadership, Malaysia's Top 10 Most Impactful Young Leaders Award 2015 by UCSI and Great Women of Our Time in 2014 by Women's Weekly.

In March 2013, Sew Hoy was selected as one of ten Global Ambassadors to hike Mt. Kilimanjaro on charity fundraiser, and her story was featured in a book about women who have climbed the mountain. In 2012, Sew Hoy was featured as the Top 10 Women in Digital Award 2012 by L'Oreal.

== Women's voice ==
In reports from TechCrunch and other publicly accessible websites, Cheryl reported her unpleasant encounter with a leader of 500 Startups, David McClure, which allegedly caused emotional distress.

=== Sexual harassment in Silicon Valley ===
In 2017, Sew Hoy came forward and published her account of the sexual harassment she claimed to have experienced in 2014. Her claims were against McClure, who had recently resigned from 500 Startups after allegation by another woman. In the account, posted online after founder Sarah Kunst and Susan Yin's accusations, Sew Hoy alleges that McClure repeatedly harassed her while in Malaysia.

In an interview to the BBC, she recounted the incident stating, "I felt like it wasn't a rare thing, it was considered normal in the start-up world, the tech world".

In a follow up interview, Sew Hoy announced that she would not be pressing charges against McClure as her main goal was to raise awareness about sexual harassment and abuse of power, specifically in the tech world.

=== #MovingForward ===
Following the release of her account, Cheryl Sew Hoy worked with co-founder Andy Coravos to establish the #MovingForward public directory. The #MovingForward directory includes dozens of tech oriented top tier venture capital firms that have posted their reporting contacts and have publicly committed to a protocol of improving anti-harassment, anti-discrimination, diversity and inclusion measures in the workplace. Launched to coincide with international Women's Day in May 2018 the movement is specifically aimed at giving young entrepreneurs who are often reluctant to speak out against investors, a forum where they may speak openly about harassment.
