= Prontohotel =

ProntoHotel
- Website type: Private
- Founded: 2007
- Headquarters: Rome, {{{location_country}}}
- Area served: Worldwide
- Industry: Travel and hotel
- Products: Metasearch for hotel prices
- Website: www.prontohotel.com

Pronto Hotel is a metasearch engine for hotel prices, founded in 2007 and based in Rome, Italy.

== History ==
The beta version of ProntoHotel launched in 2008 with a small number of partnerships with online travel agencies and hotel chains in just the larger European destinations, such as Rome, Paris, London, Berlin, and Amsterdam.

In 2009, the company implemented new software features, including the ability to filter results by a hotel's location within a particular area of the city, desired price range per night, and proximity to a specific address.

By 2011, the database of hotels grew to over 200,000 and the portal was opened up to additional markets, including Spain (prontohotel.es), France (prontohotel.fr), and Germany (prontohotel.de).

In 2013, ProntoHotel added a number of partner websites and doubled the amount of hotels in its database. The company also created the ProntoHotel Price Index (PHPI), which analyzes the hotel market and issues reports based on time period and region.

In 2014, ProntoHotel was nominated for the World Travel Awards in the Travel Technology category for “World’s Leading Hotel Comparison Website” along with Kayak.com, Hipmunk, HotelsCombined, Momondo, and Trivago.

== Technology ==
ProntoHotel operates on its own proprietary hotel metasearch engine software. The system searches the results from a database of 50 partner travel websites (hotel chain websites, independent hotel websites, and Online Travel Agency (OTA)), and aggregates the rates into a condensed list of accommodation options (including hotels, bed and breakfasts, hostels, and resorts) that meet the search criteria.

The hotel price comparison engine lists amenities of each property, including consumer ratings, industry awards, bathroom type, meeting facilities, and dining options, so that users may have the necessary facts to compare accommodations. Further information about each property is provided, including hotel rating, amenities, photos, location, and original hotel reviews written by previous ProntoHotel users.

Search results may be viewed in two formats: map view or list view. Filters help rank hotels according to price, star rating, and popularity, as well as geographical parameters such as proximity to a certain attraction, position within a neighborhood, and distance from the city center.

The hotel comparison site offers two features to further personalize search results: one is to remove undesirable hotels from the list of options and the other is to add hotels of interest to a "favorite list."

Once a hotel and rate are chosen, the travel technology redirects to the third-party vendor selling that deal. The transaction is performed directly with that supplier and all further business is conducted through that vendor.
