= DealBase.com =

Hotel package website

DealBase.com is a website that lists hotel packages. The site currently focuses on US, Mexican, Caribbean, and Central American hotels.

== History ==
DealBase.com was founded by former employees of SideStep, Expedia, and TravelPost.

In May 2009, the company announced a $1 million angel round of funding.

== Features ==
Contents of a hotel deal are broken out in itemized lists on their site. Exact or estimated standard prices are given to each line item, to calculate the approximate savings compared to what someone would pay if they assembled a package's components themselves.

The site does not accept payment from hotels ("pay to play") for more prominent placement of any particular deal or hotel in its search results.

== See also ==
- BuyWithMe
