= David Caton =

American political activist and writer

David Caton (born January 3, 1956) is an American political activist and writer. He is founder, president and sole employee of the Tampa-based hate group Florida Family Association campaigning against homosexuality and perceived dangers of Islamicization.

== Pornography addiction ==
Caton is the author of Overcoming the Addiction to Pornography (published by Accord Books in 1990), a book based partly on his own experiences. He told an American Family Association conference in 1990 that he had previously been addicted to pornography.

Pulitzer Prize–winning-journalist Bill Dedman wrote in a 1992 article that Caton had "been hooked for years on liquor, marijuana, cocaine, Quaaludes, Ativan, and masturbation."

The American Family Association took out an ad promoting Caton's book in the November/December 1995 issue of its journal that was titled "Do you Know Someone Who Can't Stop Looking at Pornography? Here's Help."

== Florida Family Association ==
Caton founded the Florida Family Association (FFA) in 1997. The FFA website states that the goal of the organization is "defending American values and improving America's moral environment. The FFA is an independent non-profit organization and is not affiliated with the American Family Association. In 2013, The New York Times noted FFA was a one-man Christian fundamentalist organization.

The FFA is classified as a "general hate group" by the Southern Poverty Law Center.

American Way Foundation President, Michael Keegan, told the USA Today, "The Florida Family Association presents itself as an army ready to strike at companies that won't cater to its extremist views. In reality, the 'group' is just one very angry man – David Caton – and his computer." In a New York Times article titled "Waging a One-Man War on American Muslims," Center for American Progress writer Wajahat Ali shared similar sentiment to Keegan, describing the FFA by saying, "It's literally one dude with a poorly made Web site one fringe individual with an e-mail list."

Federal tax records show Caton as the only employee of the FFA and that it is not affiliated with any national organization.

=== Gay rights opposition ===
In 1998, Caton orchestrated a protest of a high school support group called the Gay Straight Alliance, a club for gay students being harassed. The protest had an unintended effect and only strengthened the club, according to Principal Barbara Thornton who told The New York Times, "We found it a good thing he brought the issue out. It ended up with the student population at large supporting the Gay Straight Alliance because of the attacks from outside."

Caton has been heavily involved in the political process in local Florida governments on homosexual issues. In 1998, he led an unsuccessful campaign to repeal a gay rights law in Miami, Florida. He presented a case before the Human Relations Board in Orlando, Florida in April 2002 speaking against an ordinance that would provide job and housing protection to gays. In October 2002, Caton opposed an amendment in Sarasota, Florida that would prohibit discrimination in "housing, employment or public accommodations based on age, disability, gender, marital status, national origin, race, religion, sexual orientation or veterans status." Caton then opposed an anti-bullying bill in 2007 that would ban bullying based on a student's sexual orientation.

When Florida's ban on gay adoption was ruled unconstitutional in September 2008, Caton said it was due to "a rogue judge." Later in 2008, Caton spoke against the passage of a human rights ordinance in Pinellas County that expanded protection to gays, lesbians and bisexuals. The following year, Caton also opposed an ordinance by the Tampa City Council that would protect transgender people from discrimination. He has also similarly fought domestic partnership benefits.

Despite the FFA claiming as an accomplishment that they caused MTV to cancel "A Shot at Love" in 2008 for being a bisexual dating competition, the network ran a third season titled "A Double Shot at Love" with the same premise.

Similarly, in 2010, the FFA claimed victory in Kodak pulling advertising from the television series Degrassi: The Next Generation alleging that it "targets teens with gay propaganda and other immoral behavior"; but Kodak said in a statement their ads were stopped as part of a "planned pause" and were expected to continue the following week.

The FFA has flown airplane banners over Disney World that read "WARNING GAY DAY AT DISNEY" during the annual "Gay Day" which is not officially sanctioned by Disney. The group also campaigned against the DoubleTree by Hilton for accommodating homosexual guests.

In July 2012, Caton called on Office Depot to stop donating "bravery bracelets" with messages such as "Be Amazing" and "Be Yourself" to recording artist Lady Gaga's Born This Way Foundation. In January 2013, before Lady Gaga began her "Born This Way" tour in the United States, the FFA had a banner flown by airplane over the pre-concert tailgate that read, "NOT BORN THIS WAY."

=== All-American Muslim ===
In 2011, Caton began a protest of the TLC show All-American Muslim, a reality show that follows five Muslim families in Dearborn, Michigan. The FFA said that the show was propaganda, and a front for an Islamic takeover of America.

Caton e-mailed companies advertising during the show pressuring them to drop their advertising. Lowe's pulled their advertising, admitting that they did so partly in reaction to Caton's campaign. But Lowe's Vice President Tom Lamb later said, "The decision was absolutely not, despite what's been reported in the media, influenced by any one group."

As a result of pulling their ads, Lowe's received nationwide protests and publicly apologized, adding that Lowe's has "a strong commitment to diversity and inclusion."

Despite the withdrawal of Lowe's, All-American Muslim sold out all of their advertising time.

California Democratic State Senator Ted Lieu told the Associated Press, "The show is about what it's like to be a Muslim in America, and it touches on the discrimination they sometimes face. And that kind of discrimination is exactly what's happening here at Lowe's." Lieu also wrote to Lowe's CEO Robert Niblock calling their action "bigoted, shameful and un-American."

Amidst the controversy, the FFA website was shut down after being hacked by Anonymous.

In an interview with CNN, Rep. Keith Ellison, a Democrat from Minnesota, said Caton displays "a startling lack of information about Islam."

Caton said he and the FFA campaign also caused Home Depot to pull ads from the show, but Home Depot said it was never a sponsor for the show. Additionally, Caton also claimed Campbell's Soup had pulled their ads, but the company continued running them in future episodes.

In a 2012 article, the Tampa Bay Times Editorial Board described Caton as a "one-man force of anti-Muslim bigotry." Pulitzer Prize–winning columnist Daniel Ruth described Caton as a "plague of boils on the community's spiritual life."

=== Other positions ===
In the 1980s Caton campaigned against convenience stores in Florida that sold pornography.

Caton called for an anti-nudity ordinance in 2003, declaring that the number of rapes and domestic violence cases are due to Hillsborough County's tolerance for strip clubs.

Caton has called on schools to stop visits from the Council on American-Islamic Relations, a group that sends speakers to discuss stereotypes, human rights and women in Islam.

After Rev. Joel Hunter spoke out against intolerance against Muslims, Scott Maxwell of the Orlando Sentinel said in April 2013 that the FFA was among the groups targeting Hunter with angry and threatening emails.
