= Paul M. English =

American tech entrepreneur and philanthropist

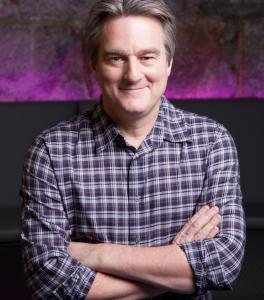
- English in 2015
- Born: 1963 (age 62–63); Boston, Massachusetts, U.S.
- Education: University of Massachusetts-Boston (Computer Science, B.S. '87, M.S. '89)
- Occupation: CEO of Boston Venture Studio
- Years active: 1989–present
- Known for: CTO and co-founder of Kayak

Paul M. English (born 1963) is an American tech entrepreneur, computer scientist, and philanthropist. He is the founder of Boston Venture Studio, and previously co-founded and served as CTO of Kayak.

In November 2012, Kayak was acquired by Priceline for $1.8 billion. Before Kayak, English had created a number of companies, including the customer service company GetHuman; the e-commerce website design company Boston Light, which was acquired by Intuit; and helped his brother Ed English create the anti-spam software company Intermute, which was acquired by Trend Micro.

Outside of tech ventures, English co-founded Summits Education, a network of 41 schools in Haiti, created in partnership with the Haitian Ministry of National Education and Partners In Health, a non-profit where English serves as a director.

He also founded The Embrace, a racial-justice project that includes the creation of a new memorial to Martin Luther King Jr. and Coretta Scott King at Boston Common and the King Center for Economic Justice in Roxbury, Boston. English also founded the Winter Walk for Homelessness and the Bipolar Social Club.

== Early life and education ==
English was born in 1963 in Boston, Massachusetts, the sixth of seven siblings in an Irish Catholic family that lived in the West Roxbury neighborhood. His mother was a substitute teacher and social worker, and his father was a pipefitter for Boston Gas. The family were congregants of St. Theresa of Avila Parish.

English attended Boston Latin School, where he was part of the school band and played the piano and trumpet. He also joined the Computer Club, where he was first introduced to computer programming.

In 1981, his mother bought a VIC-20 computer for the family on which English continued to teach himself how to code. His brother Ed had become a well-known game designer after he created a computer program to play chess. Parker Brothers had also hired Ed to convert Frogger to be playable on the Atari 2600.

Paul designed a game called Cupid on the VIC-20 which he showed to Ed. Cupid, with Ed's help, was acquired for $25,000 by Games by Apollo, which made a $5,000 down payment on the game before the company went out of business. Paul used the money to buy an Apple II with CD-ROM burner to make copies of the game for his friends. He also bought a modem to join the nascent Internet.

English continued to live in the family home and worked as a meter reader for Boston Gas in the summer after graduating from Boston Latin in 1982. His grades were not good enough to get him into a competitive school like Harvard, where several of his classmates would attend—but his high SAT scores meant that he could attend the University of Massachusetts Boston tuition-free. He also liked the fact that the school had a Jazz band.

While attending classes at night, English worked part-time for Ed's new company, adding music and sound effects to video games. After graduating with a bachelor's degree in 1987, English continued to study at UMass Boston to earn a master's degree in Computer Science in 1989. He later earned an honorary doctorate from the same university in 2019.

== Career ==
=== Early career ===
After completing the master's program at UMass Boston, English joined Interleaf, a software company based in Waltham, Massachusetts, as a member of the company's product development team. Interleaf's chief product was a WYSIWYG ("What You See Is What You Get") program, document editing software that displayed user revisions as they would appear on a printed page, a new innovation at the time.

When English joined the company, Interleaf was performing a major update of the software, and he worked on rewriting significant portions of the software's code in Lisp and C programming languages. In 1991, he became a manager of a team of programmers at Interleaf. As he rose through the ranks at Interleaf, English turned to books on business management for help on how to lead a team. In 1994, Interleaf's board fired the CEO when the company recorded a loss of $20 million that year. English and two others were appointed as caretakers of the company and responsible for hiring a new CEO. He was also responsible for correcting issues with the company's line of software products. By then, English was senior vice president of product management and marketing and earning $2 million in stock options.

After a few years in the leadership of Interleaf, English left in 1995 to join NetCentric, a local startup that was working on a tool to allow businesses to send fax over the Internet. Leaving Interleaf meant also losing half of the stock options he had been given which had yet to be vested. English worked at NetCentric for a brief period before he was either fired or quit after a disagreement with the CEO over pay for the company's engineers.

In the subsequent period, English developed an online version of the ancient Chinese chess game Xiangqi, a game he had learned to play at UMass Boston. He received offers from a few companies, including Yahoo, to acquire the online gaming community he had developed and to also hire him. English turned down these offers including Yahoo's because he did not want to move to California where the company was based.

In 1998, he founded Boston Light Software, after receiving a $50,000 contract from The Boston Globe to develop an online store for the newspaper to sell T-shirts and memorabilia. The technology industry was just at the beginning of the dot-com bubble when the NASDAQ index doubled from 1999 to March 2000. English set up office space for Boston Light in Arlington, Massachusetts, and hired several of his old colleagues from Interleaf and NetCentric.

Boston Light was acquired by Intuit, a financial software company in California, in 1999 for $33.5 million. English and his co-founder Karl Berry decide to take half their shares and split it between their employees as bonuses. Their company was safely merged into Intuit when the dot-com bubble burst taking with it many tech startups like Boston Light.

English joined Intuit as the company's director of small business Internet division. He often commuted from Boston to Intuit's headquarters in Mountain View, California. After three and half years at Intuit, English left in 2001 to take care of his ailing father who was suffering from dementia brought on by Alzheimer's. His mother had died recently and made him promise to take care of his father.

He helped his brother Ed start InterMute, which was developing anti-spam software. InterMute was later sold to Trend Micro in May 2005. English also started GetHuman, a website to help users get around automated customer-service hotlines to get to a real human agent to assist them.

=== Kayak ===
After taking a year-long sabbatical to take care of his dying father, English returned to the tech world and signed on as an entrepreneur in residence at Greylock, a venture capital (VC) firm. His former boss, Larry Bohn, who was now at the VC firm General Catalyst, introduced English to Steve Hafner. In 2004, English and Hafner co-founded Kayak, a website that allowed users to search for travel services, including flights, hotels, and rental cars.

English became chief technology officer (CTO) at Kayak and was responsible for the website's development while Hafner handled the business side. English brought on his former colleagues, including Bill O'Donnell and Paul "Papa" Schwenk. English based Kayak's engineering division in Concord, Massachusetts, while Hafner based the business office in Norwalk, Connecticut.

Unlike its then competitors Expedia, Orbitz, and Priceline, Kayak did not allow customers to actually book travel services on the website and instead referred customers to other websites like a search engine. It received referral fees of 75 cents for flights and $2 for hotels, including additional earnings if the customer actually purchased the flight, hotel room, or car rental. Kayak did not need a large sales department or administrative division. This allowed the company to focus entirely on user experience and the website's accuracy on information about prices and availability.

English also initially made it a requirement that his engineers take turns answering all customer emails, and answering customer calls which came in on the loud red phone he had installed at the office. The phone number was listed on the website for customers to call. He believed this would force his engineers to be empathetic to customers complaints and any difficulties and errors they encounter while using the website. As the company grew, however, he eventually hired a customer service team but kept the red phone operational. It continued to ring occasionally, and English himself or a senior engineer would answer the phone to speak with customers.

In 2008, just as smartphones were becoming popular, English and O'Donnell created a team to design a mobile app for Kayak. The team operated almost independently with the option not to include some of the website's features in the mobile app. Without any advertisement, the app was downloaded 35 million times by 2012 and was one of the top apps on Android and Apple iOS.

By this point, Kayak was generating, per year, 1.2 billion searches, $292.7 million in revenue, and $65.8 million in profits. On July 20, 2012, Kayak was listed on the Nasdaq stock exchange. With only 205 employees, it had $1.5 million in revenue per employee. In November 2012, Kayak agreed to an acquisition by Priceline for $1.8 billion with English earning $120 million from the deal.

=== Later career ===
In February 2013, before Kayak's sale was final, English began making plans to leave the company and start something new. English planned to invest $1 million to fund the project and also recruited O'Donnell and Schwenk, who were also still working for Kayak, to invest the same amount. He planned to create a Boston-based incubator which he named Blade.

To house this incubator, English envisioned an office space for use by the companies it was hatching that could also serve as an event space at night, with a basement public club modeled on the speakeasies of the 1920s. The rough business model for Blade included a plan to give new start-up e-commerce companies free office space and advice as they develop and seek VC financing. In return, Blade would take equity in the start-up and, once the company receives outside funding, Blade would "kick'em out" after placing either English, O'Donnell, or Schwenk on the board of directors.

Before starting this new company, all three of them needed to wind down their involvement in the leadership of Kayak. In May 2013, Priceline's acquisition of Kayak became final. By this point, both O'Donnell and Schwenk had transitioned out of Kayak, but English remained for a little longer to coach his successor as CTO. At the same time, he began work on renovating the office space for Blade in Fort Point, Boston. English was also a senior instructor at the MIT Sloan School of Management, the students whom he imagined would be the intended audience for recruitment for the incubator. He secured additional funding of $20 million from the VC firms General Catalyst and Accel in return for a combined 30% share of the incubator.

Blade opened with a party on May 16, 2014, that was attended by half of Kayak's engineers and also Deval Patrick, the outgoing governor of Massachusetts. English reviewed almost every one of the dozens of applications that Blade received for consideration. He and his cofounders selected three start-ups to focus on: Wigo, an app to allow college students to inform each other about parties, Bevy, a hardware and software solution for storing photographs and video, and Classy, a website for reselling used books. A platform for listing tech industry jobs and avenue for recommending personnel called Drafted eventually replaced Classy. In the end, English decided to start a company himself rather than only focus on incubating the start-ups they had selected.

In July 2015, English founded the travel startup Lola.com and was the company's first CEO, with O'Donnell as co-founder and CTO, and Schwenk as vice president of operations. Lola was initially a platform that used chat and artificial intelligence for booking travel arrangements with the assistance of a human travel agent who worked from home. In December 2015, Blade announced that it would, going forward, focus solely on Lola. The VC investors who had agreed to invest in Blade became investors in Lola.

In 2017, he teamed up with Wayne Chang (founder of Crashlytics and I2hub) to start Wicked Magic Productions. Their first movie together was Dear Dictator.

In July 2018, English hired Mike Volpe to serve as Lola's chief executive officer while English remained president of the company and served in the CTO role. As travel slowed during the COVID-19 pandemic, English and Volpe shifted Lola's focus to other business expense management services.

In October 2021, Lola was sold to Capital One to expand their financial services for small business.

== Philanthropy ==
After the sale of his first company, Boston Light, English began making philanthropic donations under the tutelage of Tom White, who helped start Partners In Health (PIH), a non-profit focused on improving healthcare in Haiti and other developing countries. Initially, English made occasional donations of about $10,000–$20,000 to charities recommended by White. In 2005, English made his first major contribution giving $1 million to PIH. White died in 2011 having given away the vast majority of his own wealth, and English eventually planned to do the same.

PIH was working to overcome a cholera outbreak in Haiti which followed a major earthquake in the country. English offered to fund or "backstop" a cholera vaccination program for 100,000 people. The Red Cross eventually ended up funding the project but his offer to "backstop" the program allowed PIH to move forward with acquiring the expensive vaccine, confident they would be able to find funding for the program. English serves as a director of Partners In Health. He also co-founded Summits Education, a network of free schools in Haiti. As of 2016, Summits Education, a collaboration with PIH and the Haitian Ministry of National Education, was responsible for the education of 10,000 students with 328 teachers at 41 primary schools in the Central Plateau.

English has also made contributions to the Boston Health Care for the Homeless Program, Bridge Over Troubled Waters, and the Pine Street Inn, all charities benefiting Boston's homeless population. In 2016, English founded the Winter Walk for Homelessness, a two-mile charity walk event to help homeless people in Boston. He is also the founder of Embrace Boston (initially called King Boston), a racial-justice project which created a new memorial to Martin Luther King Jr. and Coretta Scott King in Boston. The memorial was installed on the Boston Common in 2022, under the leadership of Imari Paris Jeffries, Embrace Boston's executive director. The organization has also developed other projects including the King Center for Economic Justice in Roxbury.

== Personal life ==
English was married in 1989, and he divorced in the early 2000s. He has a daughter and a son. English practices Buddhist meditation and plays several musical instruments.

English was diagnosed with bipolar disorder while working at Interleaf in the late 1980s or early 1990s. He was prescribed Lithium which he took on and off for a short period. His condition created intermittent periods of depression, hypomania, and sleeplessness that he has experienced throughout his life. English was later prescribed various pharmaceutical drugs to control his symptoms, including the antiepileptic drug Lamictal, and diagnosed with temporal lobe epilepsy, which explained the bouts of visual distortion he has occasionally experienced since childhood. The drugs helped control his periods of depression but were unable to control his hypomania.

== Sources ==
- Kidder, Tracy (2016). A Truck Full Of Money: One Man's Quest To Recover From Great Success. Random House. ISBN 978-0-8129-9524-4.
