= Etraveli Group =

Online travel agency

Etraveli Group AB
- Type: Private
- Industry: Travel technology
- Predecessors: Seat24; SRG Online
- Founded: 2007; 19 years ago
- Headquarters: Stockholm, Sweden
- Key people: Mathias Hedlund (CEO)
- Brands: Gotogate; Mytrip; Flightnetwork; TripStack; PRECISION; Wenrix; Flygresor.se
- Revenue: €880 million (2025)
- Owner: CVC Capital Partners; KKR
- Number of employees: 3,200+ (2026)
- Website: www.etraveligroup.com

Etraveli Group AB is a Swedish travel technology company specializing in flight distribution, online booking and fulfilment. Headquartered in Stockholm, it operates online travel agencies Gotogate, Mytrip and Flightnetwork, as well as B2B airline-integration platform TripStack. Etraveli provides flight content to partners such as Booking.com, with which it has maintained a partnership since 2019. The group operates across more than 75 markets and serves nearly 50 million travellers annually.

Booking Holdings agreed to acquire Etraveli from CVC Capital Partners for approximately €1.63 billion in 2021, but the European Commission prohibited the transaction in 2023.

== History ==
Etraveli was formed in 2007 through the combination of Seat24 and SRG Online (Svenska Resegruppen).

In 2015, ProSiebenSat.1 Media acquired Etraveli for approximately €235 million and incorporated it into its travel portfolio. In 2017, ProSiebenSat.1 sold the company to CVC Capital Partners at an enterprise value of €508 million. Later that year, Etraveli acquired the Greek online travel agency e-Travel. In 2019, it acquired Canadian travel technology company TripStack and online travel agency Flight Network, expanding its airline-integration capabilities. Etraveli also established a commercial partnership with Booking.com in 2019.

In November 2021, Booking Holdings agreed to acquire Etraveli from CVC Capital Partners for approximately €1.63 billion. The United Kingdom's Competition and Markets Authority cleared the proposed acquisition in September 2022. The transaction was formally notified to the European Commission in October 2022, which opened an in-depth investigation the following month. The Commission prohibited the acquisition in September 2023, concluding that it would strengthen Booking's dominant position in the market for hotel online travel agency services in the European Economic Area. Booking subsequently appealed the decision.

Etraveli broadened its B2B technology offering in 2024 with the launch of PRECISION, a travel-focused fraud and risk-management platform. In June 2025, Booking.com and Etraveli extended their partnership for a further 8 years. The following month, KKR agreed to acquire a significant minority stake in Etraveli which valued the company at approximately €2.7 billion.

In January 2026, Etraveli acquired flight-technology company Wenrix as part of the expansion of its B2B platform. The company launched a model context protocol server that allows AI agents to search and book flights through its platform, in October 2026.

== Subsidiaries ==
=== Consumer brands ===
Etraveli Group operates the online travel agency brands Gotogate, Mytrip and Flightnetwork, through which it distributes flights and travel services internationally.

==== Gotogate ====
Etraveli acquired the Norwegian online travel agency Gotogate from VIA Travel Group in 2009. Etraveli subsequently used Gotogate as a principal brand for its international expansion, launching it in additional European markets in 2014 and in 15 further markets across Asia, Oceania, the Middle East and Africa in 2015. Gotogate remains one of Etraveli's principal consumer online travel agency brands, with major markets being France, Italy, Spain, the Netherlands and Canada.

Gotogate played an early role in Etraveli's commercial partnership with Booking.com. When Booking.com introduced standalone flight bookings in seven European countries in 2019, users selecting flights were initially redirected to Gotogate to complete their reservations.

==== Mytrip ====
Mytrip originated as a brand of the Athens-based online travel agency e-Travel S.A., which Etraveli acquired in 2017. The acquisition complemented Etraveli's presence in Western Europe and the Nordic countries with e-Travel's stronger position in Eastern Europe and growing presence in the Middle East and Asia-Pacific. Etraveli currently uses Mytrip for martkets including Germany, the United Kingdom and the United States, which are now most relevant for Mytrip brand.

==== Flightnetwork ====
Flightnetwork is a Canadian online travel agency founded in 2005 and based in Toronto. Etraveli acquired the company in 2019 together with travel technology provider TripStack as part of an expansion in North America. The transaction also expanded Etraveli's airline-integration capabilities through TripStack, whose technology included access to virtual-interlining fares.

=== B2B flight technology ===
==== TripStack ====
TripStack provides flight-content aggregation and airline-integration technology, including virtual interlining, which enables itineraries combining flights from airlines without conventional interline agreements. Etraveli acquired the company in 2019 as part of an expansion of its airline-integration capabilities. In 2024, Amadeus agreed to distribute selected Etraveli content, including virtual-interlining itineraries supplied through TripStack, through the Amadeus Travel Platform.

==== PRECISION ====
Etraveli launched PRECISION in 2024 as a travel-focused fraud and risk-management service and its first standalone fintech product. The technology had previously been developed for Etraveli's own transaction-processing operations, with Outpayce by Amadeus becoming its first external partner. Its distribution was then expanded through partnerships with Mastercard Gateway and Sabre.

==== Wenrix ====
Etraveli acquired flight-technology company Wenrix in January 2026 as part of the expansion of its B2B operations. Wenrix develops predictive and artificial intelligence-based technology for flight pricing, flexibility and post-booking servicing for online travel agencies and travel management companies. The company continued to operate independently following the acquisition.

== Refunds and consumer protection ==
Etraveli's consumer brands have faced criticism over customer service, fees and the handling of flight refunds. In 2018, the Italian Competition Authority sanctioned several online travel agencies, including Gotogate, over issues including the transparency of intermediary responsibilities and payment-card surcharges. Refund-related complaints became particularly prominent during the COVID-19 pandemic, when widespread flight cancellations led to delays and difficulties contacting Etraveli brands. Refund delays involving Mytrip and Gotogate were reported during both 2020 and 2021. Customer-service and refund complaints continued after the initial pandemic disruption, with CBS News reporting numerous complaints involving Gotogate in 2022.

Following a coordinated action by the European Commission and national consumer-protection authorities, Etraveli Group, eDreams ODIGEO and Kiwi.com made commitments in 2023 concerning refunds for cancelled flights. Etraveli agreed to transfer refunds to customers within seven days of receiving the money from an airline, clear outstanding refund backlogs, and provide clearer contact information and information about passenger rights.
