= Johnny Mitrevski =

Johnny Mitrevski is a technology entrepreneur, engineer, co-founder and CTO of Scalapay, a buy-now-pay-later (BNPL) service, which became Italy's first unicorn with a valuation of more than $1bn in 2022.

== Biography ==
Johnny Mitrevski holds a Bachelor of Engineering degree in Telecommunications from the University of Wollongong. Mitrevski began his career as a Software Engineer at Nortel Networks, where he worked from 2000 to 2006. He then joined Andrew Corporation as a Senior Software Engineer, remaining with the company until 2010. Following this, he worked as a Lead Software Engineer at CommScope until 2012. From 2012 to 2013, Mitrevski served as an Agile Project Manager at Carsguide. He subsequently became a Software Engineer Manager at Telstra from 2013 to 2014. In 2014, he joined HotelsCombined as a Senior Agile Project Manager, a position he held until 2015. Mitrevski then moved to Qantas, initially serving as a Delivery Lead from 2015 to 2018, and later as a Digital Transformation Manager in 2018. In 2018, he became a Technology Manager at Commonwealth Bank, a role he held until 2019. In 2019, Mitrevski co-founded Scalapay with Simone Mancini, a BNPL service that allows purchasing items immediately and paying for them over time with no interest across Europe. The platform integrates with both online and brick-and-mortar retail systems. In January 2022, Scalapay achieved unicorn status with a valuation of over $1bn. and became the first Italian unicorn.

== Personal life ==
Johnny Mitrevski resides in Wollongong, Australia, and Milan, Italy, managing Scalapay's operations. He mentors young entrepreneurs and supports the tech community through workshops and open-source projects.
