= Nazrin Hassan =

Malaysian businessperson (b. 1973, d. 2018)

- Born: October 30, 1973; Kuala Lumpur, Malaysia
- Died: June 14, 2018 (aged 44); Mutiara Damansara, Petaling Jaya, Selangor, Malaysia
- Cause of death: Blunt force trauma to the head
- Resting place: Section 6 Muslim Cemetery, Kota Damansara, Selangor
- Education: University of Buckingham (LL.B) King's College London (LL. M)

Nazrin Hassan (30 October 1973 – 14 June 2018) was a Malaysian businessman. He served as Group CEO of Cradle Fund from October 2007 until June 2018. He died in a fire on June 14, 2018 at his home in Mutiara Damansara allegedly due to an exploding mobile phone. However, evidence has since surfaced that he had died due to blunt force trauma to the head.

== Early life ==
Nazrin Hassan was born in Kuala Lumpur, Malaysia to a Muslim family. He attended University of Buckingham and was an executive committee member of the UK Executive Council for Malaysian Students. He graduated with a Bachelor of Laws (LL.B hons) in 1994. He completed his Master of Laws (LL.M) in 1997 at King's College London.

Hassan married Samirah Muzaffar, a senior executive at the Malaysian Intellectual Property Corporation (MyIPO). The couple had one son, three stepchildren and a son from a previous marriage.

== Career ==
Hassan worked as an executive with CIMB corporate finance department from 1997 to 2000. In 2001, he started Zarnet, a technology firm.

In July 2003, Hassan joined Cradle as head of structuring, while it was called Cradle Investment Programme (CIP). He was later appointed as CIP's strategy and policy advisor in 2004. He left the programme in 2005, returning in October 2007 (now called Cradle Fund) as its chief executive officer.

Hassan was instrumental in enacting the Angel Tax Incentive in Malaysia during his tenure with Cradle. He helped to establish the Malaysian Business Angel Network (MBAN) where he served as secretariat chairman. He was a member of Technopreneurs Association of Malaysia (TeAM).

He was a board member of the Malaysian Global Innovation & Creativity Centre (MaGIC) from its inception in April 2014 to February 2015. Hassan was a board member of Cradle’s venture capital arm, Cradle Seed Ventures (CSV) until death.

== Death ==
Nazrin Hassan died in a controversial fire in an upper bedroom in his home on the eve of Hari Raya and final day of Ramadan on June 14, 2018. He was 45 years old. Initially, the post-mortem report claimed that cause of death was shrapnel from a mobile phone explosion. On June 25, a forensic report stated the discovery of gasoline stains on his body, bed and mobile phone which led to the reclassification of the case as murder. His wife and her ex-husband (Nizam Mydin) and other family members were detained in September, but released without charges.
