= Opacity (disambiguation) =

Opacity or opaque may refer to:

- Impediments to (especially, visible) light:
  - Opacities, absorption coefficients
  - Opacity (optics), property or degree of blocking the transmission of light
- Metaphors derived from literal optics:
  - In linguistics:
    - Opaque context, a term to describe the linguistic context of co-referential terms
    - Phonological opacity, a term in phonology
    - Semantic opacity, the opposite of semantic transparency
  - Opaque travel inventory, the market of selling unsold travel inventory at a discounted price
- Musical works:
  - Opacities (EP)
- Computer science:
  - Measure of obscuration of background by "painting" an image, e.g. alpha channel
  - Use of an opaque data type
  - Property attributed to data that can be interpreted only by using an external entity, e.g. magic cookie technology
  - Opaque binary blob, in network-engineering and computer-science technology, a large set of binary data (a blob) that looks like garbage to those unacquainted with its internal structure.
