= Lola.com =

American software company

- Website type: Corporate travel SaaS
- Available in: English
- Creators: Paul M. English; Bill O'Donnell
- Commercial: Yes
- Registration: Required
- Launched: July 6, 2015; 11 years ago
- Current status: Defunct (2021)

Lola.com was a software as a service (SaaS) company based in Boston, Massachusetts. It was best known for developing corporate travel management and expense software for web browsers, the App Store and Google Play. The company was founded in 2015 by former Kayak.com executives, Paul M. English and Bill O'Donnell.

The website operated under a travel agency model for hotel and flight search information as well as booking services for businesses. It also had administrative analytics on employee travel and associated costs. Lola had received more than $80 million in funding since its foundation.

== History ==
In July 2015, Blade, a Boston-based incubator, began focusing on a single startup. By December, English announced that Lola had emerged from stealth mode. The company's name was derived from a combination of the words "latitude" and "longitude".

It acquired HopOn, a travel booking company, in 2015 and Room77, a hotel metasearch website, in 2016. The company launched an iOS application in April 2016 where users chatted with human travel agents. That same month, it completed a $20 million Series A funding round led by General Catalyst and Accel.

The company had more than $44 million in total funding after a December 2016 Series B round led by Charles River Ventures. GV and Tenaya Capital each invested $5 million in the round, while previous investors General Catalyst and Accel also participated. In July 2017, Lola had its second major release on iOS and the Android operating system. This iteration of the application focused on business travel by adding self-service hotel and flight booking and personalized travel recommendations.

In July 2018, English announced he would assume the role of chief technology officer at Lola, with Mike Volpe, the chief marketing officer at Cybereason, becoming the company's chief executive officer. Lola announced a five-year exclusive partnership with American Express Global Business Travel in November 2018 to sell its travel management software.

In March 2019, the company announced a $37 million Series C round led by General Catalyst and Accel. The round also included participation from all previous investors – Charles River Ventures, GV, and Tenaya Capital.

In February 2021, due to the impact of the COVID-19 pandemic on tourism, the company pivoted to developing software for the financial technology industry.

In October 2021, Capital One hired 57 of Lola's employees and acquired its software. The deal did not include the Lola brand or domain. Lola closed its Boston office, ended its corporate contracts and issued refunds to clients who were owed them.

English kept the Lola name after the Capital One deal and used it for Lola Dating, an app spun out of his Boston Venture Studio in 2023. In April 2026, he reached a deal with Booking Holdings for the lola.com domain and joined the company. Booking Holdings used the name for an AI assistant which launched in September 2026.
