= Hugo Burge =

English businessman (1972–2023)

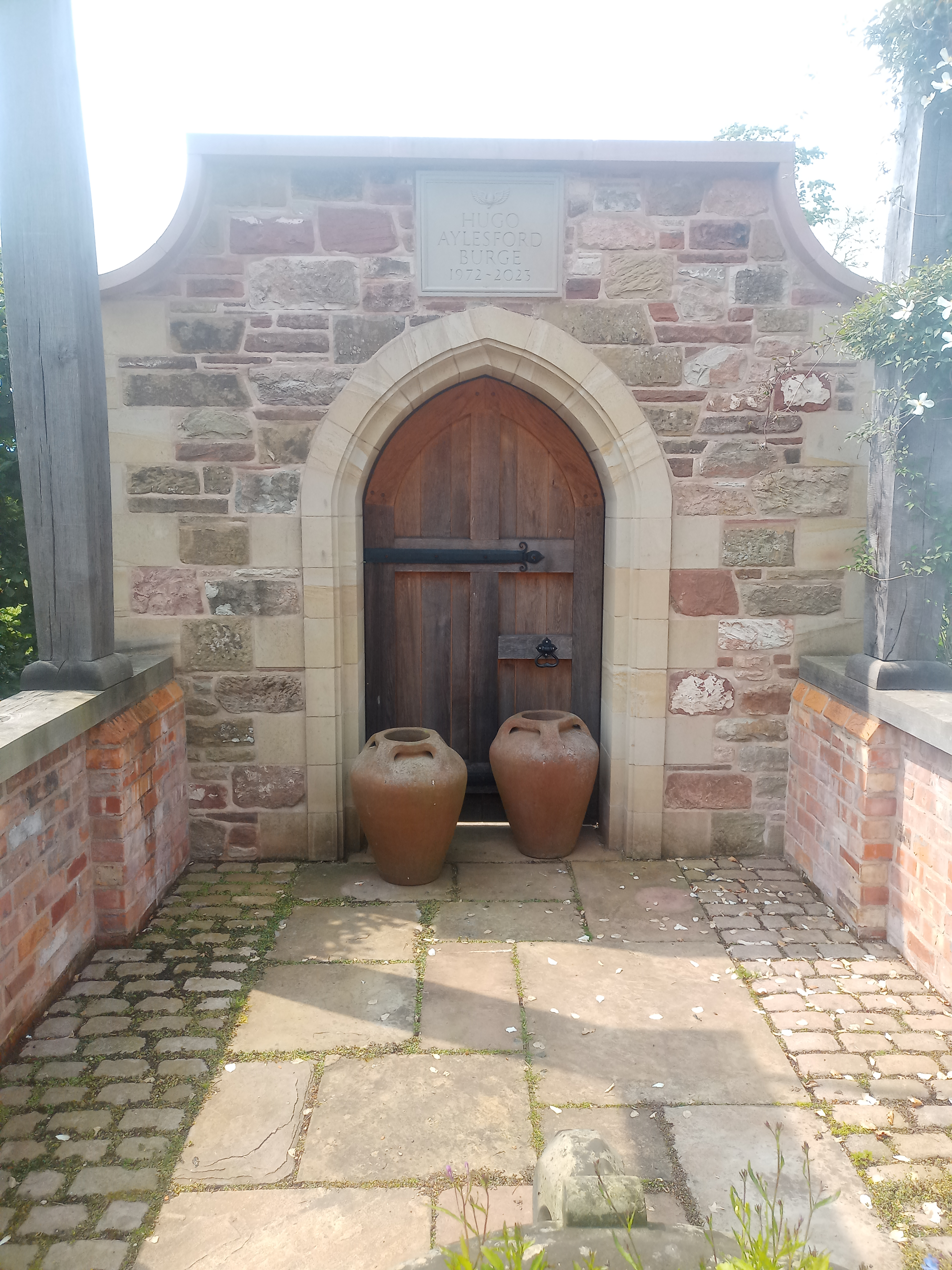
Hugo Burge memorial gate in the walled garden of Marchmont House

Hugo Burge (6 April 1972 – 10 May 2023) was an English travel business executive, internet entrepreneur and investor, and the founder of Marchmont Ventures, an organisation that supports arts and crafts.

== Life ==
Burge was born and raised in London. In 2000 he invested in the online flight booking website Cheapflights as part of the management buy-in led by banker David Soskin who became the company's CEO. Burge joined the management team and was appointed chief executive in 2011. During his tenure, the company acquired the Danish travel search engine, Momondo, with Momondo Group replacing Cheapflights as the name for the parent company. After successfully arranging Momondo's sale to Priceline Group in July 2017, he stepped down from the chief executive role. As an investor he co-founded the investment company HOWZAT in 2006; it would invest in a number of digital travel sector businesses, including Trivago.

Burge's father, Oliver Burge, bought the Marchmont Estate in the Scottish Borders as an investment in 1988. The main property there Marchmont House was still being used as a nursing home by the Sue Ryder charity until the home closed in 2005. It was subsequently bought by the Burges in 2007. After renovating the house and settling there himself, Burge founded Marchmont Ventures in 2018, an organisation to support the arts and crafts movement, of which he was a long time supporter. He turned Marchmont House into a retreat for artists, converting the stables into studios and the garage into a workshop. In 2019 he founded the charity Marchmont Makers Foundation to fund writers' and artists' residencies, as well as to support local schools and charities. In 2022, Burge organised a celebration of the work of artist and musician Rory McEwen, who had lived at Marchmont House as a boy. He was also a patron of the Borders Art Fair.

In 2018, Burge's contribution to the travel sector was recognised when he was inducted into the British Travel and Hospitality Hall of Fame. For their restoration work on Marchmont House, Hugo and Oliver Burge were also joint recipients of the 2018 Historic Houses Sotheby's Restoration Award and the Georgian Group 2017 Architectural Award for Best Restoration of a Georgian interior.

Hugo Burge died suddenly on 10 May 2023, at the age of 51. Following his death, Marchmont Makers Foundation was renamed The Hugo Burge Foundation in his memory.
