= Darren Huston =

Canadian businessman

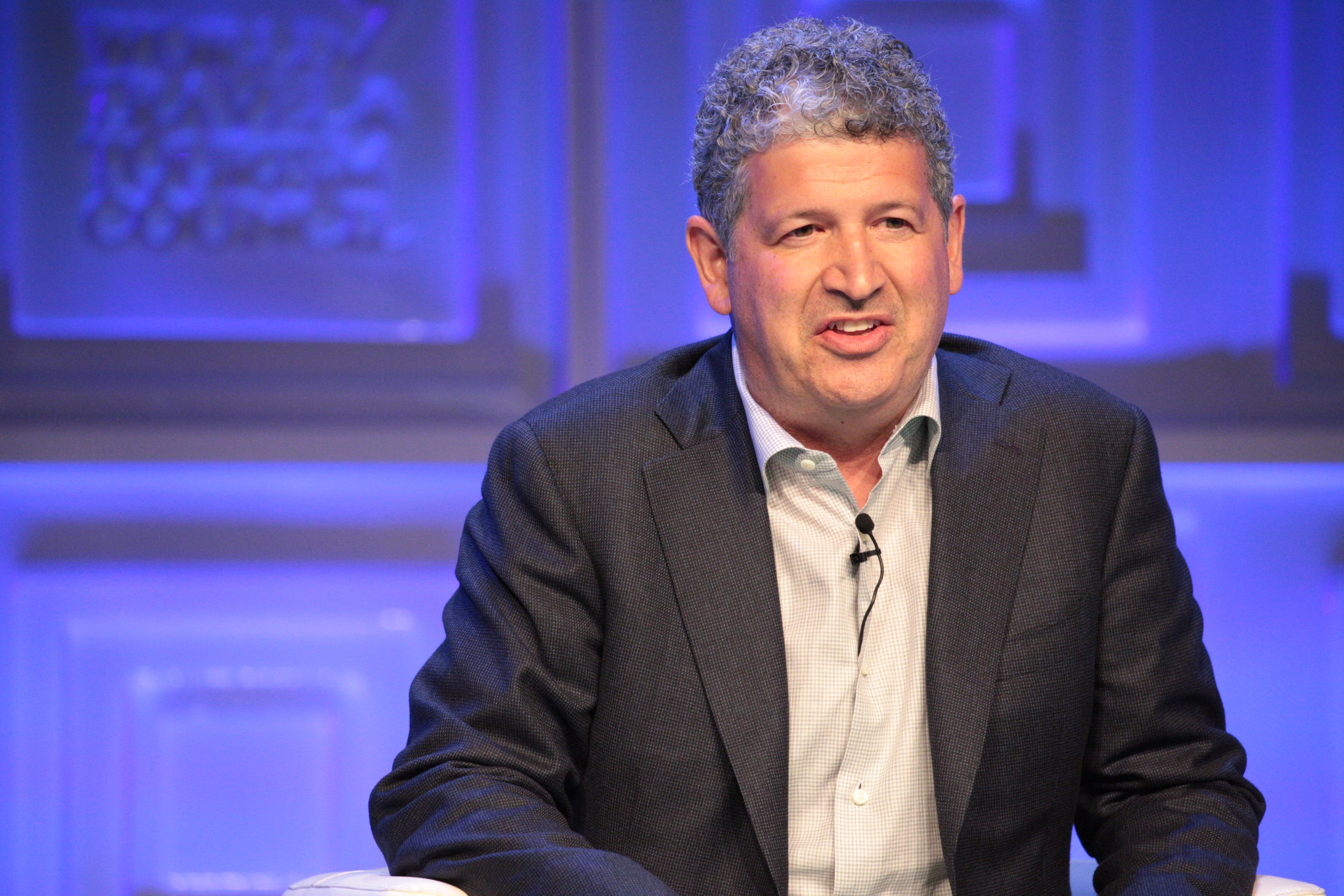
- Born: Darren R. Huston; 3 January 1966 (age 60); Hope, British Columbia, Canada
- Education: Trent University; University of British Columbia; Harvard Business School
- Occupations: Founder and CEO of BlackPines Capital Partners

Darren R. Huston (born 3 January 1966) is a Canadian businessman. He is the founder and chief executive officer (CEO) of BlackPines Capital Partners. Huston was previously president and CEO of Priceline and Booking.com.

== Early life ==
Darren R. Huston was born on 3 January 1966 in Hope, British Columbia, Canada. He completed his high school education at the United World College of the Adriatic in Italy, received a BS in economics from Trent University, an MA in economics from the University of British Columbia, and an MBA from the Harvard Business School.

== Early career ==
From 1990 to 1992, Huston was an environmental policy adviser for the Canadian government. From 1994 to 1998 he held an executive position with McKinsey & Company. From 1998 to 2003, he was a senior vice president at Starbucks. During his time with the company, he introduced Wi-Fi in physical stores and the development of the Starbucks Card payment system.

He joined Microsoft in 2003 and was corporate vice president for the United States until 2005 when he became president and CEO of Microsoft Japan. From 2008 to 2011, Huston was corporate vice president of global operations, responsible for its consumer and online business.

== Later career ==
He joined Booking.com as CEO in September 2011, and dually became CEO of its parent company Priceline Group in January 2014. He resigned in April 2016 following an investigation into a relationship with an employee. During his tenure, the company tripled its number of room nights booked and increased its employee base to more than 15,000 people.

In May 2016, Huston formed BlackPines Global Advisors, N.V. By January 2017, Huston was appointed executive chairman of Allegro and established a consultancy relationship with BlackPines Capital. He was appointed chairman of Magento. By June 2017, BlackPines Capital Partners, Inc. was reincorporated in Canada.
