= Priceline.com =

American online travel agency

- Type: Subsidiary
- Industry: Online travel agency
- Founded: 1997; 29 years ago (online 1998)
- Founder: Jay S. Walker
- Headquarters: Norwalk, Connecticut, United States
- Key people: Brigit Zimmerman (CEO)
- Parent: Booking Holdings
- Website: www.priceline.com

Priceline.com is an online travel agency for finding discount rates for travel-related purchases such as airline tickets and hotel stays. The company facilitates the provision of travel services from its suppliers to its clients. Priceline.com is headquartered in Norwalk, Connecticut, United States and is wholly owned by Booking Holdings, which also owns Kayak.com, Booking.com and other sites. The company was founded in 1997. It operates in more than 200 countries and territories around the world and has partnerships with over 400 airlines and 300,000 hotels. Users can search for travel deals and discounts on the website; in the past it also offered the "Name Your Own Price" feature to bid on hotel rooms and flights.

== History ==
Priceline was founded by Jay S. Walker, who left the company in 2000, by which time Richard S. Braddock, Citicorp's #2, had come aboard as chief executive. Braddock left in 2004, having helped take the company public in 1999.

Entrepreneur Michael Loeb assisted in the "creation and early funding".

Priceline first became known for its Name Your Own Price system, where travelers would name their price for airline tickets, hotel rooms, car rentals, and vacation packages. While the purchaser can select a general location, service level, and price. The sales are for opaque travel inventory; details are disclosed only after the transaction is complete with no possibility of cancellation.

Priceline's profit from the proceeds is the difference between the price suggested by a customer and the one charged by the service provider. It has also added a more traditional model, called Express Deals, where travelers have presented prices and a geographical perimeter within which the hotel will be located but are not told the name of the establishment.

Priceline offers a tool named Pricebreakers for Hotel bookings. It claims that the price of the hotels are up to 50% off retail. It is somewhat similar to Express Deal but instead of showing the geographical location within a perimeter, it provides the names of 3 hotels, and one of the hotels will be allocated after the payment is done.

In 2002, Priceline licensed its Name Your Own Price travel system to eBay.

In November 2007, Priceline “permanently” eliminated all booking fees on published airfares.

In April 2014, Priceline.com Incorporated changed its name to "The Priceline Group Inc." The corporate name change was intended to create a clear delineation between the global Priceline business. Now, Priceline.com is one of six primary brands of Booking Holdings.

Priceline announced in May 2015 that it would invest an additional $250 million in Chinese online travel company Ctrip to tap the fast-growing China market.

Priceline officially ended its Name Your Own Price deals for flight bookings in 2016, rental cars in 2018 and hotels in 2020.

=== Other services ===
Priceline.com experimented with selling gasoline and groceries under the Name Your Own Price model in 2000, at the height of the dot-com bubble, through a partially owned affiliate, WebHouse Club.

Priceline got into the online auction business with Priceline Yard Sales, where individuals would use the Priceline system to haggle for various second-hand items and trade them in person.

Priceline sold long distance telephone service and automobiles under the Name Your Own Price model.

These experiments were terminated in 2002.

Another experiment, the Name Your Own Rate system for home loans, continues under a license with EverBank.

In 2016, Brett Keller was named CEO of the priceline.com brand.

== Spokespeople ==
=== William Shatner ===
In 1997, William Shatner became the spokesman for Priceline.com, agreeing to do the spots in exchange for stock in the company. Shatner allegedly sold the stock before the burst of the dot-com bubble, making a $600 million profit; however, this number was disputed as an urban legend by CEO Jeffery Boyd. An early ad campaign featuring Shatner had him belt out popular songs in spoken word, in the style of his album, The Transformed Man. He was "replaced" in 2004 by his Star Trek co-star, Leonard Nimoy. Shatner still appeared in spots for Priceline, running into Nimoy as his replacement. When that campaign ended, Shatner again became Priceline's sole spokesperson.

In 2007, an ad campaign by Butler, Shine, Stern & Partners had Shatner take on the role of the Priceline Negotiator. In commercials that began airing January 22, 2012, Shatner's Negotiator character apparently dies as a bus falls off a bridge and explodes. Subsequent ads have featured his "spirit," still advertising Priceline.com from beyond the grave. In August 2012, Shatner was brought back in a commercial located on a stormy, cloudy beach, parodying the end of the film Point Break. A man, apparently an investigator, stands next to Shatner. Shatner is holding a wooden surfboard, wearing a suit with shortened pants and pitching the new way of booking a hotel. He states that surfing is his life now and "we'll see where the waves take me. Sayonara!" and goes charging into the waves.

Priceline has been parodied on The Tonight Show with Jay Leno and in multiple Saturday Night Live skits. In a September 2008 SNL skit, during the opening monologue by Olympian Michael Phelps, Shatner rose from the audience to give Phelps tips on product endorsements.

=== Theresa Caputo ===
In June 2012, Theresa Caputo, star of the television show Long Island Medium, appeared in a commercial for Priceline.com, in which she portrayed herself "connecting" with the late Priceline Negotiator character previously played by William Shatner. However, this commercial has sparked controversy, since the commercial appears to make light of the Native American belief of smudging.

JREF President DJ Grothe released an open letter calling out Priceline.com for endorsing Caputo, stating, "It is difficult to watch the show and not feel heartbroken for those who are desperate to hear from the departed... and even more so if they are being manipulated by a charlatan." Grothe urges Priceline.com to "invite... your new representative" to take the James Randi One Million Dollar Paranormal Challenge and prove her credentials.

=== Kaley Cuoco ===
In January 2013, Kaley Cuoco from the sitcom The Big Bang Theory joined William Shatner as his fictitious daughter in Priceline.com commercials.

== Criticisms ==
Priceline does not include resort fee amounts in the bidding. Therefore, it's possible to win a bid for a hotel and then be forced to pay mandatory resort fees (for example, often $25 per night for resort hotels in Las Vegas). Priceline continues this practice despite a 2012 warning to the industry from the Federal Trade Commission (FTC). The FTC continues to state the following regarding how hotels and third parties should disclose such fees:

Listing the "resort fee" near the quoted price or in the fine print—or referring to other fees that "may apply"—isn't good enough.

Priceline was one of the companies accused in 2013 of using the services of Wiki-PR, a public relations firm specialized in editing of Wikipedia that has been accused of subverting Wikipedia content for business interest.

== See also ==
- Booking.com
- Expedia
- Travelocity
