= Florida Family Association =

American non-profit organization

The Florida Family Association (FFA) is an American non-profit organization founded by David Caton and based in Tampa, Florida. It campaigns against homosexuality and Islamic-American relations. The organization is classified as a hate group by the Southern Poverty Law Center. In 2013 the New York Times noted FFA was a one-man Christian fundamentalist organization.

== History ==
David Caton founded the organization now known as the Florida Family Association in 1987, which at the time, was operating as the American Family Association. The American Family Association of South Florida was founded by Darlene R Caban in 1988 out of Miami. Caton assumed leadership after Caban resigned due to threats to her family. Caton in 1990, authored the book, Overcoming the Addiction to Pornography. Bill Dedman, a Pulitzer Prize-winning journalist wrote an article about the AFA in 1992 titled "Bible Belt Blowhard" that chronicled the group, and wrote that Caton had "been hooked for years on liquor, marijuana, cocaine, Quaaludes, Ativan, and masturbation."

Caton eventually broke off from the AFA and set up the FFA where he is Executive Director. The AFA, also labeled a hate group, is considered to be more mainstream than the FFA according to The New York Times.

According to the New York Times, the FFA operates with Caton serving as the only employee. The newspaper reported in December 2011 that Caton "aimed almost entirely at homosexuals" for 15 years, but that in the previous two years had "largely dropped the anti-gay banner in favour of a new villain: American Muslims".

== Anti-gay activities ==
The Florida Family Association compared gay children to murderers in a 1998 protest of the Gay-Straight Alliance, a club formed at Largo High School in Florida for children being harassed. Principal Barbara Thornton said the FFA had "launched a vicious attack against our students." Thornton also noted that despite their protest, the FFA was unsuccessful as the student population rallied behind the club.

In August 2012, Caton created a derogatory term for transvestites, combining the word with homosexual to create "transmo."

=== Legislation ===
The FFA unsuccessfully opposed an Orlando city ordinance to provide job and housing protection to gays, and an anti-bullying bill aimed at banning bullying based on a student's sexual orientation. The group has also opposed the passage of a human rights ordinance that would expand protection to gays, lesbians and bisexuals, while also opposing a measure that would protect transgender people from discrimination.

=== Entertainment ===
The FFA also targeted the television series "Degrassi: The Next Generation" and asked advertisers to pull their ads. After the FFA claimed victory in Kodak stopping their ads, Kodak said in a statement that their ads were stopped as part of a "planned pause" and would continue the following week.

The FFA has flown banners by airplane over Walt Disney World that state: "WARNING GAY DAY AT DISNEY," and did so similarly prior to a Lady Gaga concert, with the banner reading "NOT BORN THIS WAY."

== Anti-Muslim activities ==
In 2011, the Florida Family Association campaigned against advertisers of the TLC show "All-American Muslim." The reality show stars five Muslim families in Dearborn, Michigan. The FFA claimed that the absence of radical Muslims advances Islamic fundamentalism, citing the fact that the show did not portray Muslims as terrorists. Caton compared Muslims to snakes in an interview with the Associated Press.

The FFA emailed advertisers demanding they stop advertising during the show. Lowe's pulled their ads and then faced nationwide protests due to their decision and issued an apology. In their statement, Lowe's said it has "a strong commitment to diversity and inclusion."

The FFA has also called on schools to stop visits from the Council on American-Islamic Relations (CAIR), an organization that facilitates speaking engagements to educate on stereotypes, human rights and women in Islam.

An Orlando reverend, Joel Hunter, voiced opposition to intolerance against Muslims and subsequently received hundreds of emails and letters from the FFA, one of which said, "I hope your family dies in a fire."

In September 2013, the FFA flew a banner before a Cincinnati Bengals football game that targeted Procter & Gamble due to their advertisements airing on television network Al Jazeera America. The banner read "Procter & Gamble Sponsors Jihad TV."

=== Claims ===
The FFA sent emails to companies advertising during All-American Muslim urging them to drop their advertising. But Lowe's Vice President Tom Lamb later said, "The decision was absolutely not, despite what's been reported in the media, influenced by any one group."

The FFA also claimed Campbell's Soup had removed their advertising, but the company continued running them in future episodes. The FFA also claimed that they influenced Home Depot to stop advertising during the show, but Home Depot said it was never even an advertiser, with one ad showing by accident.

=== Public Reaction ===
The New Jersey Star-Ledger editorial board called the FFA a "club for bigots," while the Tampa Bay Times editorial board described the FFA as "one-man force of anti-Muslim bigotry." Pulitzer Prize-winning columnist Daniel Ruth described Caton as a "biblical bully" and a "plague of boils on the community’s spiritual life." Jon Stewart mocked the FFA's campaign against "All-American Muslim" on The Daily Show.

In the wake of the controversy, "All-American Muslim" sold out all of their advertising time.

California State Senator Ted Lieu wrote to Lowe's CEO Robert Niblock calling the company's action "bigoted, shameful and un-American." Minnesota Democratic Congressman Keith Ellison, said that Caton displays "a startling lack of information about Islam" and called the FFA a "fringe group that is literally promoting hatred and bigotry."

The Florida Family Association website was shut down in December 2011, claiming that it had been hacked by Anonymous.

As of 2022, the site is back online at: Florida Family Association
