= TravelPost =

Travel blogging website

TravelPost was founded in February 2004 by Sam Shank, a graduate scholar of the Kellogg School of Management.

It was initially launched as a travel blogging site, where users could register and set up their own blog area, which acted as an online travel journal where people could write about their travels or hotels, and upload various photos. They were one of the first travel sites to allow people to plot where they'd traveled onto an online map, before the advent of Google Maps made this practice ubiquitous on travel sites. (Now other sites like WhereIveBeen.com and the Cities I've Visited feature on TripAdvisor do this.)

== Partnership ==
In 2005, they licensed hotel review data from Market Metrix and raised a $1M Series A led by Amicus Capital and various angel investors including members of the North Bay Angels and Ron Conway. This partnership evolved the location into a hotel reviews site that allowed for filtering of reviews by reviewer demographic.

== Acquisition ==
SideStep acquired TravelPost in October 2006. The founder continued to operate the site for 15 months while at SideStep. He has since founded DealBase.com.

Kayak.com later acquired SideStep in December 2007 and took over the operations of the site.

In March 2009, Kayak.com relaunched TravelPost as a hotel information site, with hotel reviews and rates for hotels aggregated from several travel sites. This was regarded as an entry to a niche dominated by another hotel-reviews site, TripAdvisor.

In Spring 2010, KAYAK.com sold TravelPost to one of its board members Greg Slyngstad. The two companies continue to work very closely together.
