= All-American Muslim =

American reality TV series

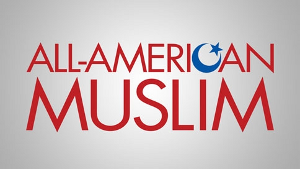
- Created by: TLC
- Country of origin: United States
- Original language: English
- No. of seasons: 1
- No. of episodes: 8

Production
- Executive producers: Nick Emmerson; Jennifer O'Connell; Dan Peirson
- Production location: Dearborn, Michigan
- Running time: Approx. 43 minutes

Original release
- Network: TLC
- Release: November 13, 2011 – January 8, 2012

All-American Muslim is an American reality television series that aired on TLC. The program followed the daily lives of five Lebanese-American Shia Muslim families in Dearborn, Michigan, the largest Muslim community in the United States. All-American Muslim premiered on November 13, 2011.

TLC canceled All-American Muslim after one season, citing low ratings.

== Format ==
Each episode follows members of various Shia Muslim families going through the events of their daily lives, with emphasis placed on how their faith affects their actions. Interview segments with individual cast members are interspersed throughout, in which they explain specific points of Islam and how they relate to the various situations. Cast members also appear in short round table segments in which they discuss general principles of Islam as they relate to specific events depicted in the episode.

== Cast ==
- Amen family: Parents Mohsen and Lila Amen and their adult children Suehaila Amen, Shadia Amen, Bilal Amen and Samira Amen. Shadia has a son, Adam Amen, and in the first episode she marries Jeff McDermott who converted to Islam from Catholicism to marry Shadia. Samira is married to Ali Fawaz.
- Aoude family: Nader and Nawal Aoude have their first child, Naseem, in episode four.
- Bazzy-Aliahmad family: Ali and Nina Bazzy-Aliahmad have one son, Andre.
- Jaafar family: Mike and Angela Jaafar have four children, Jenna, Julia, Jad and Ryan.
- Zaban family: Fouad and Zaynab Zaban have four children, Jamilah, Ayah, Mohamed and Fatima.

== Development ==
TLC ordered All-American Muslim from Shed Media U.S. in July 2011. The initial order was for eight 30-minute episodes. The episode length later expanded to 60 minutes. TLC general manager Amy Winter said, "We wanted to show there was diversity even within the Muslim community. These are families that might have beliefs that are different than yours, but we are all living similar daily lives and hopefully we will bring that to light."

Before deciding on Dearborn, TLC considered Muslim communities in San Diego, Washington and Northern Virginia.

== Episodes ==
No.	Title	Original release date
1	"How to Marry a Muslim"	November 13, 2011
2	"The Fast and the Furious"	November 20, 2011
3	"A Muslim Goes to Washington"	November 27, 2011
4	"Friday Night Bites"	December 4, 2011
5	"Muslims Moving On"	December 11, 2011
6	"A Chance at Redemption"	December 18, 2011
7	"The Day the World Changed"	January 1, 2012
8	"Crunch Time"	January 8, 2012

== Critical and popular response ==
Following a screening at the 2011 Television Critics Association Press Tour, The Hollywood Reporter dubbed All-American Muslim "fascinating". Noting that the participants believed the series was not intended to be educational, THR nonetheless felt that "watching their lives will teach us a lot about the culture of Americans who practice Islam and how they're both similar and unique from us". In a formal review following the series premiere, THR reiterated its praise. With the caveat that the series might look very different were it focused on Dearborn's more conservative Palestinian or Yemeni communities, THR found the series "undeniably authentic and moving" and that viewers would come away with a greater understanding of the Muslim-American community.

The series premiere was viewed by 1.7 million viewers. Ratings dropped for subsequent episodes, with the December 18 episode registering 900,000 viewers. The series has averaged 1 million viewers per episode.

== Sponsorship controversy ==
TLC General Manager Amy Winter was asked about the possibility of sponsor backlash while the series was in production. She responded, "We usually find with TLC that the backlash occurs as soon as we start marketing something and once viewers experience the show, we get a far different response."

On December 9, 2011, born-again Christian David Caton, the "founder and sole employee" of the Florida Family Association, sent e-mails to various companies, claiming that the show is favorable propaganda for Muslims and urging them to withdraw their sponsorship from the show. The home-improvement chain Lowe's did so. FFA posted an email (which Lowe's described as a "form letter") in which the chain noted FFA's communication and informed the group that it would pull its advertising. A chain spokesperson said it was because of "concerns, complaints or issues from multiple sides of the viewer spectrum" and did not mention the FFA specifically. Lowe's later posted to its Twitter feed: "We did not pull our ads based solely on the complaints or emails of any one group. It is never our intent to alienate anyone. Lowe's values diversity of thought in everyone, including our employees and prospective customers."

In response to Lowe's decision, celebrities including Russell Simmons and Mia Farrow called for a boycott of the retail outlet. Simmons bought advertising time for the episode scheduled to air December 18, 2011. Actor and former Associate Director in the White House Office of Public Engagement Kal Penn also called for a boycott. Representative Keith Ellison, the first Muslim elected to the United States Congress, criticized Lowe's decision "to uphold the beliefs of a fringe hate group and not the creed of the 1st Amendment." Representative John Conyers of Michigan called on Lowe's to apologize. Michigan state representative Rashida Tlaib contacted the company's corporate headquarters, reporting that Lowe's declined to change its decision. California state senator Ted Lieu also issued a boycott call, labeling the Lowe's action "bigoted, shameful, and un-American". He further stated he would explore "legislative remedies" if Lowe's did not rescind its decision.

Muslim-American and Arab-American activists joined in the criticism. The American-Arab Anti-Discrimination Committee called upon members to contact Lowe's to urge it to reverse its position. The Los Angeles chapter of the Council on American-Islamic Relations met to consider possible actions, including boycotts and protests. The Arab Community Center for Economic and Social Services, based in Dearborn, and the National Network for Arab-American Communities announced that they would no longer accept donations from Lowe's.

In response, Lowe's stated, "As you know, the TLC program 'All-American Muslim' has become a lightning rod for people to voice complaints from a variety of perspectives – political, social and otherwise. Following this development, dozens of companies removed their advertising from the program beginning in late November. Lowe's made the decision to discontinue our advertising on Dec. 5. As we shared yesterday, we have a strong commitment to diversity and inclusion, and we're proud of that longstanding commitment. If we have made anyone question that commitment, we apologize."

FFA stated that 65 companies removed their advertising from the series, including Kayak.com. Kayak's chief marketing officer, Robert Birge, released a statement that TLC was "not upfront" about the nature of the series and that the decision to pull the company's advertising was based in part on the quality of the series, which he said "sucked". Three companies, Campbell's, Sears Holdings Corporation and Bank of America, disputed FFA's assertion. TLC said advertising support remained strong.

A member of the Internet civil disobedience group Anonymous hacked the FFA's website in response to the controversy, exposing personal information about FFA newsletter subscribers and donors and condemning the group for "hatred, bigotry and fear mongering towards gays, lesbians and most recently Muslim Americans".

Lowe's received a petition on December 20, 2011, calling on Lowe's to reconsider, containing 200,000 signatures. Lowe's met with representatives of the petitioners for over an hour but declined their request.
