= Cheapflights =

Travel fare metasearch engine

- Website type: Subsidiary
- Available in: English, French, Spanish, German, Italian, Portuguese, Turkish, Swedish, Norwegian, Danish, Russian, Dutch, Czech, Finnish, Polish, Romanian, Ukrainian and Chinese
- Founded: 1996; 30 years ago U.S. company: March 21, 2003; 23 years ago
- Headquarters: London, United Kingdom
- Founder: John Hatt; David Soskin
- Key people: Hugo Burge (CEO)
- Industry: Travel
- Parent: Booking Holdings
- Website: www.cheapflights.com www.cheapflights.co.uk www.in.cheapflights.com

Cheapflights is a travel fare metasearch engine. The website is part of the Kayak.com subsidiary of Booking Holdings.

Its websites publish flight prices, and compare prices from suppliers, including major airlines, through tiny travel agents.

Agents advertise on the Cheapflights websites and are charged on a pay-per-click basis for users who link through to their websites.

== History ==
Cheapflights was founded in 1996 by John Hatt. That year, its first website, www.cheapflights.co.uk, launched. In 2000, ex-ABN Amro banker David Soskin and Hugo Burge led a buyout of the website from its founder. The website was the first in the UK to launch the pay-per-click online advertising remuneration model.

In May 2003, the US website, www.cheapflights.com, was launched. In 2006, the website handled £1 billion in annual travel sales. In April 2007, the Canadian website, www.cheapflights.ca, was launched. In October 2008, the first non-English website, www.cheapflug.de, was launched. Co-founder David Soskin resigned as chief executive to become vice-chairman that same year. In 2009, the Australia / New Zealand website was launched.

In January 2011, the company launched mobile websites. In March 2011, the company acquired momondo, a rival online travel agency. The two websites and brands were kept independent of each other. It also discontinued Zugu. In October 2014, Great Hill Partners, a private-equity firm, invested £80m for a majority stake in the company that owned Cheapflights and momondo, valuing it at £132 million. In February 2015, the South African website was launched. In June 2015, the United Kingdom website was launched as a metasearch engine. In June 2016, Cheapflights added search capability within Facebook Messenger. In October, Cheapflights reorganized some of its staff. In July 2017, Cheapflights and momondo were acquired by Booking Holdings for $550 million.
