= Malaysian Global Innovation and Creativity Centre =

- Type: Government-linked company (GLC)
- Founded: 27 April 2014
- Headquarters: Block 3730, Persiaran APEC, 63000 Cyberjaya, Selangor, Malaysia
- Key people: Dzuleira Abu Bakar (CEO); YBhg. Dato Abdul Rahman bin Dato’ Mohd Hashim (Chairman)
- Parent: Ministry of Science, Technology and Innovation (MOSTI)
- Website: www.mymagic.my

The Malaysian Global Innovation and Creativity Centre or MaGIC is an innovation and creativity centre located at Cyberjaya, Selangor, Malaysia.

The centre which is under the Ministry of Finance was officially opened on 27 April 2014.

Cheryl Yeoh was appointed as the first and founding CEO of MaGIC on 15 April 2014 and ended her contract on 14 January 2016.

== History ==
In April 2014, Cheryl Yeoh was headhunted by the government of Malaysia and appointed as the first CEO of MaGIC, leaving her career in Silicon Valley.

MaGIC was given an initial grant of US$21.4 million and was launched on 27 April 2014.

In 2015, MaGIC started out by running accelerator programs for startup companies in Malaysia, led by a team handpicked by Yeoh. The first intake brought in 77 startups, making MaGIC's accelerator program the largest in Southeast Asia.

Yeoh stepped down on 14 January 2016 after her contract period ended. Her CEO position was replaced by Ashran Ghazi shortly after.

In November 2018, Ashran Ghazi announced his resignation to join consumer intelligence firm, Dattel. His position was replaced by former venture capitalist from Cradle Seed Ventures, Dzuleira Abu Bakar, in April 2019.

In September 2020, MaGIC kicked off the fourth cohort of their Global Accelerator Program (GAP) with 40 participating startup teams.

== Building ==
The Obama Oval at the building compound was named after US President Barack Obama.

== Employees ==
Key MaGIC employees have gone on to start startups such as Amazing Fables and GoCar.
