= Booking.com =

Dutch online travel agency

- Company type: Subsidiary
- Website type: Travel and accommodation services
- Available in: 43 languages
- Founded: 1996; 30 years ago Enschede, Netherlands
- Headquarters: Amsterdam, Netherlands
- Area served: Global
- Owner: Booking Holdings
- CEO: Glenn Fogel
- Industry: Travel agency
- Parent: Booking Holdings (since 2005)
- Website: booking.com
- Commercial: Yes
- Registration: Optional
- Launched: 1996; 30 years ago
- Current status: Online

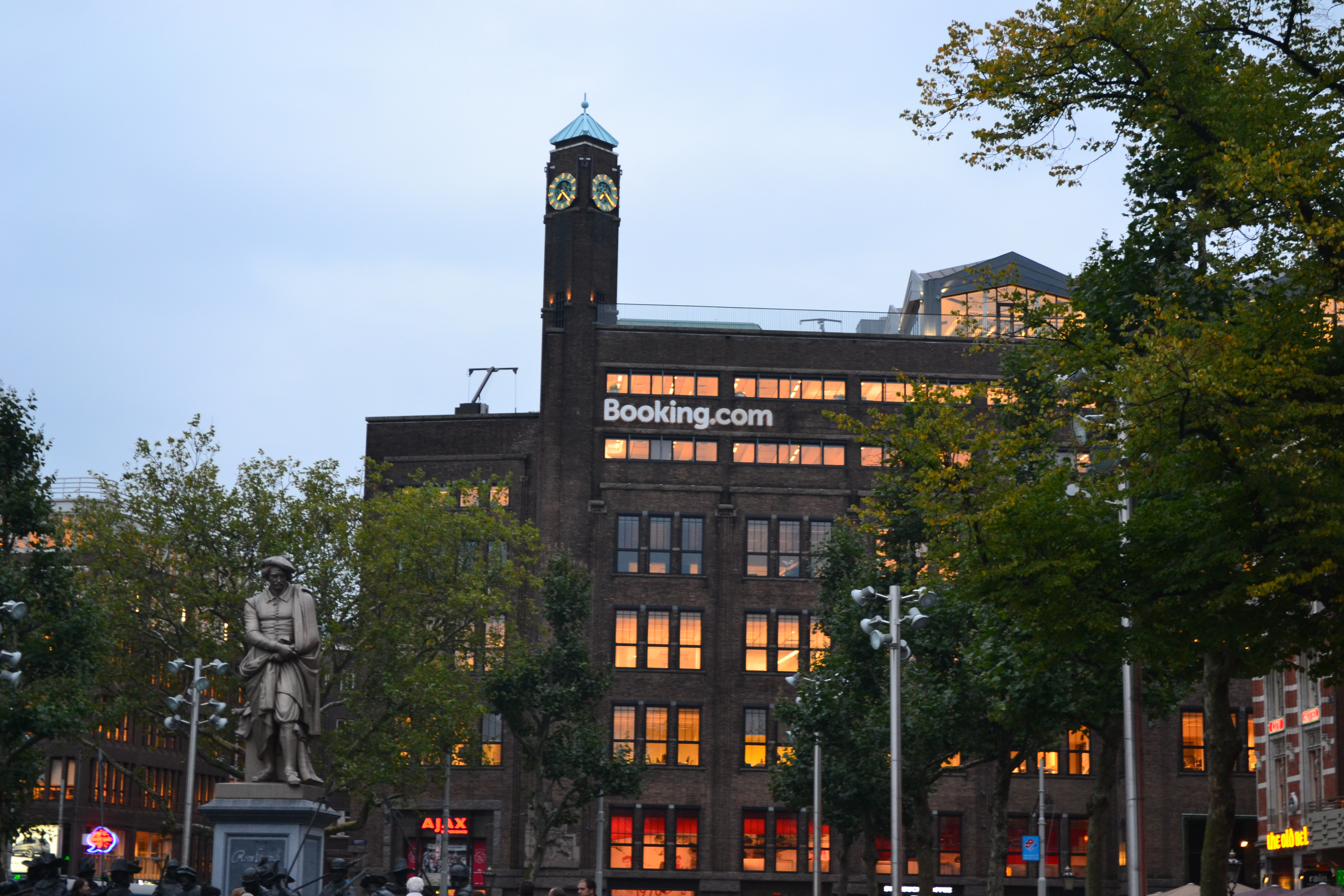
Booking.com's previous head office in Amsterdam

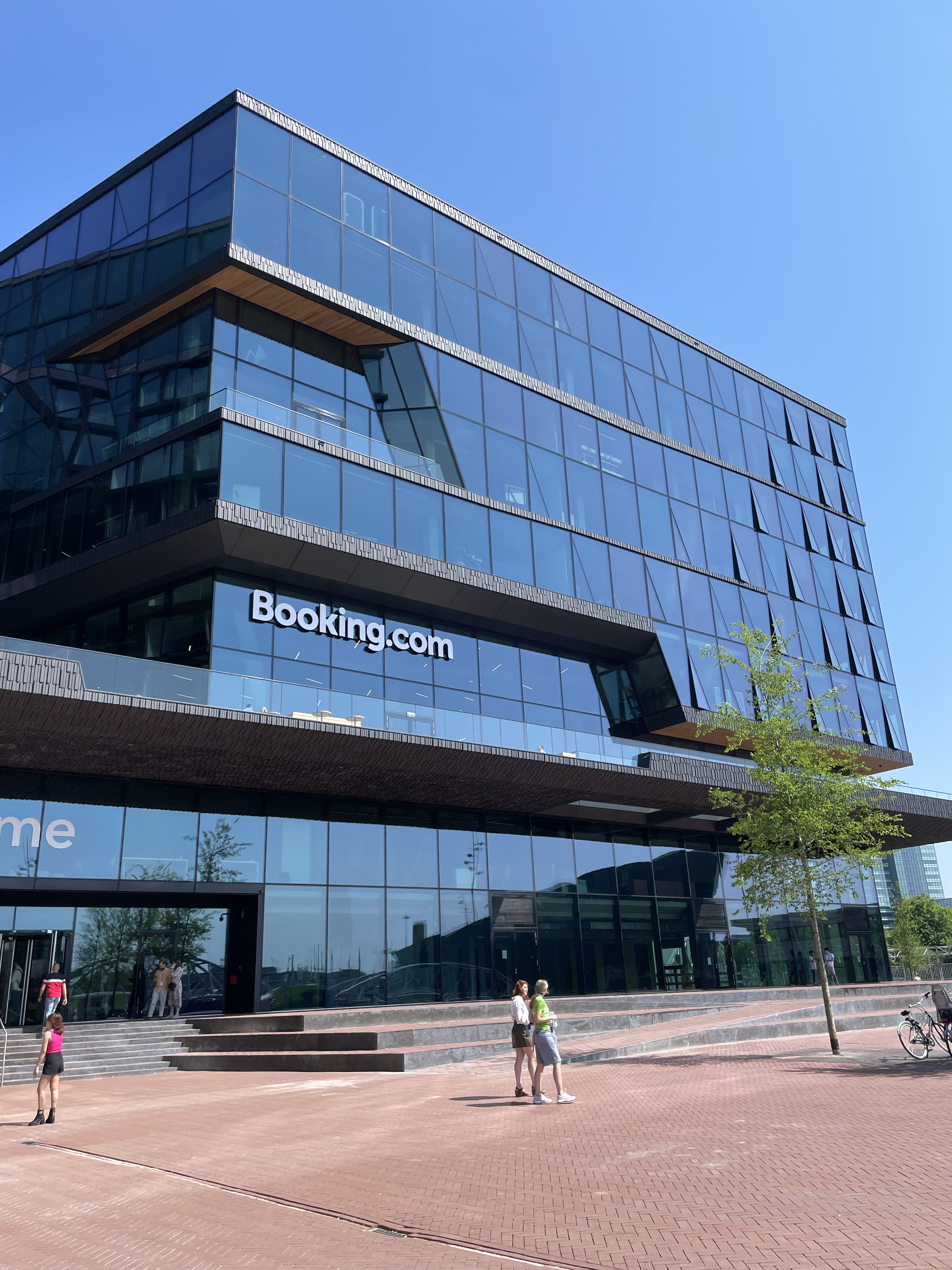
Booking.com's head office in Amsterdam

Booking.com is a Dutch online travel agency headquartered in Amsterdam, Netherlands, a subsidiary of Booking Holdings. Booking.com is one of the largest online travel agencies, providing lodging reservation services for about 3.4 million properties, including 475,000 hotels, motels, and resorts, and 2.9 million apartments in over 220 countries, and in over 40 languages.

== History ==
In 1996, Geert-Jan Bruinsma, a student at University of Twente, founded Bookings.nl. In 2000, Booking.com was formed when Bookings.nl merged with Bookings Online (Note: Bookings Online was founded by Sicco and Alec Behrens, Marijn Muyser, and Bas Lemmens.) and operated as Bookings.org. The name and URL were changed to Booking.com, with Stef Noorden appointed as its CEO. In July 2005, the company was acquired by Priceline Group (now called Booking Holdings) for $133 million. It was merged with ActiveHotels.com, a European hotel booking company founded by cousins Andy Phillipps and Adrian Critchlow in 1998 and purchased by Priceline Group for $161 million in September 2004.

In 2006, Active Hotels Limited changed its name to Booking.com Limited. The merger of Booking.com and Active Hotels helped its parent company improve from a deficit of $19 million in 2002 to $1.1 billion in profit in 2011. The acquisition of Booking.com was praised by some as “the best acquisition in Internet history”. Between 2010 and 2012, the company launched mobile apps for the iPad, Android, iPhone, iPod Touch, Windows 8, and Kindle Fire. Since January 2013, advertisements have dubbed "booking.com" as "booking.yeah."

In 2020, the Supreme Court of the United States decided within the Patent and Trademark Office v. Booking.com B. V. case that the term "Booking.com", via the suffix ".com", had created an identity that could be differentiated from the generic verb and hence could be trademarked. In the summer of 2023, Booking.com announced the start of testing an artificial intelligence-based travel planner based on ChatGPT, intended to help choose a direction, plan a route, or answer questions. The service will be available to a limited American userbase. In November 2023, Booking.com launched the ability to make cruise reservations in the United States, in partnership with World Travel Holdings.

=== Management history ===
Darren Huston was appointed as the CEO in September 2011, serving from 1 January 2014 until his resignation on 28 April 2016 due to an exposé of his extramarital affair with another employee. Gillian Tans succeeded Huston, but resigned in 2019. She was succeeded by Glenn Fogel.

== Issues ==
=== Anti-competitive behaviour ===
In September 2012, the United Kingdom's competition authority, the Office of Fair Trading (OFT), issued a statement of objections against Booking.com, Expedia, and IHG Hotels & Resorts, claiming that Booking.com and Expedia had entered into separate arrangements with IHG, which restricted its ability to give users discounts. Booking.com, Expedia and IHG asked the OFT to change their restrictions. It was accepted by the OFT, but rejected by higher authority at a tribunal.

In April 2015, French, Swedish and Italian competition authorities accepted a proposal by Booking.com to drop its "rate parity" clause, allowing competitors to offer lower hotel prices than it. Hotels are still prevented from discounting prices on their own websites. In April 2015, the European Union warned that Booking.com might have reached market dominance beyond the point of no return.

In March 2017, a Turkish court halted activities of Booking.com in Turkey due to Turkish competition law violations in a case filed by the Turkish Association of Travel Agents. The ruling blocked the website in Turkey. However, it can be accessed from foreign countries to make reservations for hotels in Turkey.

In July 2026, over 10,000 European hotels were reportedly involved in a collective action against Booking.com over alleged anti-competitive practices, including restrictions on hotels' freedom to set prices and a distorted competition to their detriment.

=== Booking cancellations for higher-price relisting ===
Booking.com reportedly cancelled hotel reservations to relist hotel rooms at much higher prices.

=== Customer privacy breach ===
In November 2014, it was revealed that criminals were able to obtain customer details from the website. Booking.com said it was countering the fraudsters and refunding customers from the UK, US, France, Italy, the UAE, and Portugal, all of which had been affected. Since the fraud, Booking.com has made changes so data can only be accessed from a computer linked to the hotel's server. Its teams have also worked to "take down" dozens of phishing sites, as well as working with some banks to freeze the money mule bank accounts. The website was again targeted by hackers in June 2018.

On 6 April 2021, the Dutch Data Protection Authority fined Booking.com €475,000 for failing to report the breach within the GDPR-mandated time frame. Criminals obtained the data of over 4,000 customers, including the credit card information of about 300 people. In November 2022, Salt Labs discovered flaws in the login process, which could have enabled bad actors to take over guest accounts.

In 2023, the BBC Watchdog found that guests had been contacted by fraudsters over the Booking.com's messaging system, spoof emails, and WhatsApp resulting in financial loss and leaked data. Guests said that it was very difficult to make complaints to Booking.com, citing poor customer service. The fraudsters directed guests to Booking.com replicas, which comprised their reservation data and personal details, and asked them to make payments or validate their cards. In November 2023, the BBC highlighted that the practice had become so lucrative that criminals were offering up to $2,000 for hotels' login details.

In April 2026, cybercriminals obtained booking information via a data breach, whereupon they sent users phishing messages claiming that they had been overcharged and that they could apply for refunds via the embedded phishing links, prompting the Swiss National Cyber Security Center to issue a public warning. Similar incidents continued through July 2026, involving hackers sending bogus WhatsApp messages about hotel bookings to customers to lure them into providing payment card details via phishing links.

As of August 2026, damages incurred by vacationers scammed while using Booking.com reportedly rose to over 82,000 euros in the first half of 2026 from over 75,000 euros last year. Fraud that caused the damages reportedly involved phishing, fake advertisements, hijacking of landlords' accounts, and false payment requests via fake websites created by fraudsters.

=== Manipulative sale techniques ===
In 2019, following dialogues with the European Commission and national consumer authorities, Booking.com said that it would clarify marketing statements concerning time-limited offers, price comparisons, the amount of available rooms, and the types of vendors offering accommodations. Changes were reportedly made to ensure that sponsored listings were flagged, alongside the presentation of total prices to consumers. In 2023, Booking Holdings was sued by Texas for alleged deceptive trade practices in citing hotel room prices.

=== Payment delays ===
In 2023, Booking.com delayed payments to thousands of accommodation hosts worldwide. Hosts from Scotland, England, Europe, Australia, New Zealand, Sweden, Netherlands, Denmark, Croatia, Hungary, Cyprus, Japan, Thailand, and Indonesia say they were affected. It blamed "unforeseen technical issues." The payment scandal has received the most press coverage in Hungary in 2023. Details of the scandal were on the front page of most Hungarian news sites for several weeks.

The Hungarian Competition Authority found it necessary to request an expedited investigation into Booking.com over the debt. The Hungarian Tourism Agency offered legal aid to the affected ones and sent questionnaires to accommodation providers to assess the problem's extent.

On 6 September 2023, Hungary's competition watchdog GVH raided the Budapest office of Booking Holdings as part of a probe into the online accommodation booking and service market in Hungary in context of the expedited investigation. Glenn Fogel, Booking.com's CEO, apologized on 7 November 2023 to the affected hosts.

=== Property safety incidents ===
In July 2026, a family reportedly found a stranger hidden behind the wall of their booked holiday rental, despite it being advertised as "the entire home is yours." On 24 July 2026, an accommodation host threatened to sue Booking.com for allegedly issuing an €805 refund to a guest who damaged her holiday rental and stole €500-worth of items.

Other customers highlighted difficulties seeking refund over unsafe properties reserved via Booking.com, with Booking.com reportedly denying responsibility on the basis that it is "not a contractual party" in any agreements between customers and hoteliers. Hoteliers are also not seen by Booking.com as liable for compensating customers.

=== Request for government aid during COVID-19 pandemic ===
In April 2020, Booking.com drew criticism when it applied for government aid from the Dutch government's relief programme for business affected by the COVID-19 pandemic, while paying billions to shareholders, with $6.3 billion in cash on its balance sheet. In response, on 22 May, Booking.com announced that it would not seek further wage subsidies from the Dutch government, and instead look for long term answers. The company laid off 25% of its global workforce.

=== Suspected brand hijacking ===
In February 2015, an open letter published by German hotelier Marco Nussbaum, co-founder of the "prizeotel" budget-design hotel brand, strongly criticized Booking.com's "brand hijacking" activity, where the company bade significant sums of money to become the top listing on Google Search for several hotels.

=== Unlawful charging of commissions ===
In July 2019, luxury-hotel chain Aldemar, invoking "practices [by Booking.com] that go against the laws of the market," ended its participation in Booking's offerings. The Greek Hotels Association denounced Booking.com for charging its percentage fee on the VAT-inclusive full-room price. Booking.com responded that according to the terms of its bilateral agreements with hotels "everywhere," each party to such an agreement is free to walk away from it. In November 2023, Booking.com agreed to pay roughly 94 million euros to settle a VAT dispute in Italy.

=== Other disputes ===
==== Inclusion of listing in Israeli settlements ====
On 12 February 2020, the company was included on a list of companies operating in West Bank settlements involved in activities that "raised particular human rights concerns" published by the United Nations Human Rights Council. The company was categorized under "the provision of services and utilities supporting the maintenance and existence of settlements". In September 2022, the company added a warning to its listings in Israeli settlements, although the language was toned down at the request of the Israeli government.

In November 2023, human rights organizations including ELSC, Al-Haq, SOMO, and The Rights Forum filed a criminal complaint in the Netherlands against Booking.com, accusing it of profiting from war crimes by listing vacation rentals in illegal Israeli settlements, under international law, on occupied Palestinian land — which they argue constitutes money laundering under Dutch law. The groups demand accountability, citing international law, UN blacklisting since 2020, and corporate complicity in apartheid-like systems. Booking.com dismissed wrongdoing and claims U.S. laws prevent divestment.

In February 2026, a coalition of Spanish civil society organisations filed a criminal complaint in the courts of Madrid against eDreams ODIGEO, Booking.com, and an Expedia subsidiary. The complaint alleged money laundering from proceeds linked to war crimes in occupied Palestinian and Syrian territories, invoking Articles 301 and 611 of the Spanish Penal Code and Spain's Royal Decree-Law 10/2025, adopted in September 2025, which prohibits the advertising of services in occupied territories.

== See also ==
- Airbnb
- Hotels.com
- KAYAK
- Tripadvisor
- Vrbo
