= Sarah Kunst =

Entrepreneur and investor

Sarah Kunst is an entrepreneur and angel fund investor. She was, as of 2018, the managing director of Cleo Capital. Kunst has worked at Apple, Red Bull, Chanel and Mohr Davidow Ventures and was on the Board of Venture for America.

She founded LA Dodgers backed Proday and has served as a senior advisor at Bumble where she focused on their corporate VC arm Bumble Fund and on the board of the Michigan State University Foundation endowment.

In 2014 Kunst was one of the women entrepreneurs who came forward documenting a pattern of harassment by male colleagues in the tech industry, the incidents she surfaced contributed to the resignation of David McClure as General Partner of 500 Startups.

Kunst was named as a Future Innovator by Vanity Fair in 2018, Marie Claire named her as one of six women who could teach you how to be a success before age 35, and as one of the top 25 African-Americans in tech by Business Insider and Pitchbook, and top 25 innovator in tech by Coolhunting. She was honored as a top women in STEM by Create & Cultivate.
