= Mozio =

Mozio, Inc.
- Type: Privately held company
- Industry: Transportation, Software
- Founded: 2011; 15 years ago
- Headquarters: New York, New York
- Key people: David Litwak, Joseph Metzinger
- Products: Mobile apps and search engine
- Website: www.mozio.com

Mozio is a New York City-based transportation-search engine company that aggregates ground transportation data and plans trips to and from an airport. Mozio coordinates buses, trains, boats, rapid transit, and other types of transit to allow users to arrive at the airport as fast as possible.

== History ==
Mozio was founded in 2011 by David Litwak and Joseph Metzinger.

Mozio completed Plug and Play's Start-up Camp in February 2012 and has since created partnerships with a number of large and small agencies, including Uber, Shuttlefare, and Limos.com. Its platform compares time and cost metrics in order to find the most efficient option for each traveler and destination.

In 2013, Mozio raised seed money from investors including Jeff Clarke, Chairman of Orbitz. The first airports to be included in the search services were San Jose, Oakland, and San Francisco. The company is focusing on development of its ground-transportation-to-airport platform. In 2016 the company partnered with Ethiopian Airlines.

As of 2018 Mozio provides ground transportation services for JetBlue, Booking.com, Hotels.com, Despegar, Air New Zealand, CheapOAir and incorporates Uber and Lyft in its transportation network. News media report that Mozio has a "bigger fleet than Uber and Lyft combined" due to its partnerships with those and other ground transportation companies.

In Ontario, Canada, the regional rail operator GO Transit uses Mozio for their e-tickets and promotional passes.

== See also ==
- Mozio Article on HuffPost
- Mozio Article on SiloBreaker
