= Opaque travel inventory =

Market of selling unsold travel inventory at a discounted price

An opaque inventory is the market of selling unsold travel inventory at a discounted price. The inventory is called "opaque" because the specific suppliers (i.e. hotel, airline, etc.) remain hidden until after the purchase has been completed. This is done to prevent sales of unsold inventory from cannibalizing full-price retail sales. According to TravelClick, the opaque channel accounted for 6% of all hotel reservations for major brands in 2012, up 2% from 2010.

The primary consumers of opaque inventories are price-conscious people whose primary aim is the cheapest travel possible and are less concerned with the specifics of their travel plans. Hotel discounts of 30-60% are typical, and bargains are stronger at a higher star hotel. While one has control over the dates and times of a travel itinerary, the downside is these purchases are absolutely non-refundable and non-changeable and, as noted above, the specific hotel or airline is not revealed until after purchase.

The main sources of opaque inventories are Hotwire.com and Priceline.com, but Travelocity.com and Expedia.com also offer opaque booking options. Hotwire has a fixed pricing model, where it sells a room at a fixed price with a limited description of a given venue, whereas Priceline offers both a similar fixed pricing model and a bidding model where travelers bid for a hotel room from among a group of hotels of a given star rating and location. Typically hotel deals are greater than airline discounts on opaque travel sites, namely because airlines have limited seating and also take monetary cuts when publishing discounted fares, whereas a hotel sells to opaque sites to fill empty rooms.

In response to these opaque travel sites, there are also 'decoder' sites that use feedback from recent purchasers to help construct a profile of the opaque travel property.
