= Booking Holdings =

American travel technology company

Booking Holdings Inc.
- Formerly: Priceline.com Incorporated (1998–2014); The Priceline Group Inc. (2014–2018)
- Type: Public
- Traded as: Nasdaq: BKNG; Nasdaq-100 component; S&P 100 component; S&P 500 component
- Industry: Travel; Technology
- Founded: 1996; 30 years ago in Stamford, Connecticut, U.S.
- Founder: Jay S. Walker
- Headquarters: Norwalk, Connecticut, U.S.
- Key people: Glenn D. Fogel (CEO); Robert J. Mylod Jr. (chair); Peter J. Millones, Jr. (general counsel); Paulo Pisano (CHRO)
- Products: Booking.com; Priceline.com; Agoda; Rentalcars.com; Kayak; OpenTable; Rocketmiles; FareHarbor; HotelsCombined; Cheapflights; momondo
- Revenue: ▲US$26.9 billion (2025)
- Operating income: ▲US$8.83 billion (2025)
- Net income: ▼US$5.40 billion (2025)
- Total assets: ▲US$29.3 billion (2025)
- Total equity: ▼US$−5.6 billion (2025)
- Number of employees: 24,300 (2025)
- Website: bookingholdings.com

Booking Holdings Inc. is an American travel technology company based in Norwalk, Connecticut, that owns and operates several travel fare aggregators and travel fare metasearch engines including namesake and flagship Booking.com, Priceline.com, Agoda, Kayak, Cheapflights, Rentalcars.com, Momondo, and OpenTable. It operates websites in about 40 languages and 200 countries.

The company is ranked 243rd on the Fortune 500 list of the largest United States corporations by revenue. The company primarily derives its revenue from commissions, with a small portion derived from advertising. In 2023, consumers booked 1.235 billion room nights of accommodation, 88 million rental car days, and 68 million airplane tickets using websites owned by Booking Holdings.

== History ==
In 1996, Jay S. Walker founded Priceline.com Incorporated in Stamford, Connecticut, which launched Priceline.com, an online travel site, that used a Name Your Own Price bidding model.

On March 31, 1999, Priceline.com Incorporated became a public company via an initial public offering, making Walker, who owned a 35% stake in the company, a multi-billionaire. The company's original ticker symbol was "PCLN".

The company experimented with selling other products and services such as groceries, gasoline, home mortgages, and cars, but these offerings were discontinued in 2000.

In July 2005, the company acquired Booking.com for $133 million and was merged with ActiveHotels.com, a European online hotel reservation company, purchased by Priceline Group for $161 million in September 2004.

In April 2014, the name of the company was changed from priceline.com Incorporated to The Priceline Group Inc.

In August 2017, Kayak acquired the assets of Mundi, a Brazilian metasearch company.

In February 2018, the company changed its name to Booking Holdings and changed its Nasdaq ticker symbol to the current "BKNG".

In 2021, the company offered to acquire GoToGate; however, the deal was blocked by European regulators in 2023.

=== Management history ===
Jeffery H. Boyd was named chief executive officer in 2002 and remained in that role until becoming chairman in 2013.

Effective January 2014, Darren Huston was named chief executive officer of the company, replacing Jeff Boyd. In April 2016, Huston was forced to resign following an undisclosed personal relationship with an employee, and Boyd was named interim CEO.

Effective January 2017, Glenn D. Fogel was named chief executive officer and president.

== Finances ==
The key trends for Booking Holdings are (as at the financial year ending December 31):

	Revenue (US$ bn)	Net profit (US$ bn)	Total assets (US$ bn)	Employees
2016	10.7	2.1	19.8	18,500
2017	12.6	2.3	25.4	22,900
2018	14.5	3.9	22.6	24,500
2019	15.0	4.8	21.4	26,400
2020	6.7	0.06	21.8	20,300
2021	10.9	1.1	23.6	20,300
2022	17.0	3.0	25.3	21,600
2023	21.3	4.2	24.3	23,600
2024	23.7	5.8	27.7	24,300
2025	26.9	5.4	29.3	24,300

== Acquisitions ==
#	Year	Company	Price	Ref(s).
	1997	Priceline.com		
1	2004	Major stakes in Travelweb and Active Hotels		
2	2005	Booking.com	$135 million	
3	2007	Agoda.com		
4	2010	TravelJigsaw / Rentalcars.com		
5	2013	Kayak.com	$1.8 billion	
6	2014	OpenTable	$2.6 billion	
7	2014	Buuteeq and Hotel Ninjas	$98 million	
8	2015	Rocketmiles		
9	2017	Momondo and Cheapflights	$550 million	
10	2017	Mundi		
11	2018	FareHarbor	$250 million	
12	2018	Minority stake in DiDi	$500 million	
13	2018	HotelsCombined	$140 million	
14	2019	Venga		
15	2022	Getaroom	$1.2 billion	
16	2026	Libro (via OpenTable)	Undisclosed	
