= Momondo =

Travel meta-search site

- Website type: Subsidiary
- Available in: English, French, Spanish, German, Italian, Portuguese, Turkish, Swedish, Norwegian, Danish, Russian, Dutch, Czech, Finnish, Estonian, Polish, Romanian, Ukrainian and Chinese
- Founded: September 2006; 20 years ago
- Headquarters: Copenhagen, Denmark
- Owner: Booking Holdings
- Founder: Thorvald Stigsen
- Key people: Tore Pein Jensen (CMO KAYAK & Managing Director Momondo A/S); Steve Hafner (CEO KAYAK); Peer Bueller (CFO KAYAK)
- Industry: Travel
- Website: momondo.com

Momondo (stylised momondo) is a travel fare aggregator and travel fare metasearch engine. momondo was founded in Denmark and is today managed by KAYAK, part of Booking Holdings.

== History ==
momondo was developed in Denmark and launched in September 2006.

In March 2011, Cheapflights Media, operator of Cheapflights, a rival online travel agency, acquired momondo.

In 2011, momondo launched its app for iPhone and Android.

Cheapflights Media changed its name to Momondo Group in 2012.

In January 2014, momondo launched "momondo places", a free city guide with maps.

In July 2014, momondo launched its "Trip Finder" tool.

In October 2014, Great Hill Partners, a private equity firm, invested £80m for a majority stake in the Momondo Group, the company that owned the Cheapflights and momondo brands, valuing it at £132 million.

In June 2015, momondo launched its "Travel Saver Calendar" tool.

In 2016, momondo launched “Anywhere Search”.

In July 2017, the Momondo Group, owner of the momondo and Cheapflights brands, was acquired by Booking Holdings for $550 million.

== Marketing ==
In 2016, momondo launched an ad campaign called "The DNA Journey" in partnership with Ancestry.com. momondo invited 67 participants from around the world to take a DNA test to find out more about their ancestry. The results were revealed on camera in a group setting, with the video uploaded to YouTube. The campaign won 43 awards, including seven Cannes Lions and four Clio awards.

In 2019, momondo launched a campaign called “The World Piece”. Among 6,550 applicants, 61 participants from 61 countries got individual, yet connected single-lined tattoos, designed by tattoo artist Mo Ganji. The participants then met to film in London, resulting in a film uploaded to Youtube. The campaign won 3 awards, including two Lovie awards.

== Awards ==
In 2010, Travel + Leisure named momondo the best travel website for finding bargain fares.

momondo was ranked first in Frommer’s list of "The 10 Best Airfare Search Sites".

momondo received the Best Meta Search Website award in both 2014 and 2015 at the Travolution Awards.

In 2017, the Telegraph named momondo the best flight comparison website for multi-city and mobile.

The same year, momondo won the Google Material Design Award for App innovation.

In two years in a row, 2019 and 2020, momondo was awarded a Wilhelmina Skog Award for best meta travel site.

In 2020, momondo won Focus Money Awards for top flight search engine, top flight search, top website, top flight deals, top customer service, and top value.
