= HotelsCombined =

Hotel metasearch engine

- Company type: Subsidiary
- Founded: 2005
- Headquarters: Sydney, Australia
- Area served: Worldwide
- Founders: Yury Shar; Brendon McQueen; Michael Doubinski
- Industry: Travel; Technology; Search Engine
- Products: Metasearch for hotel prices
- Parent: Booking Holdings (KAYAK division)
- Website: hotelscombined.com
- Native clients on: iOS, Android, Facebook Messenger

HotelsCombined, a unit of Booking Holdings, is a hotel metasearch engine founded in 2005, with headquarters in Sydney, Australia.

The site operates in over 42 languages, handles 130 different currencies and aggregates more than 2 million deals from hundreds of travel sites and hotel chains. The company employs over 200 staff.

== History ==
In 2005, Yury Shar, Brendon McQueen and Michael Doubinski partnered to create an all-encompassing hotel site where users could access the best rates from a variety of top travel sites all in the same place. All three founders previously worked for HotelClub, now absorbed and merged with Hotels.com.

Initially working out of their homes and without having raised any financial capital, the HotelsCombined founders launched the site following nine months of development. The website steadily earned an organic consumer base; within a year, the co-founders were able to hire their first employee. Today, HotelsCombined has nearly 200 employees and 17 million users monthly. The site is available in more than 220 countries and in over 42 different languages. It was acquired by Booking Holdings in 2018 and became part of its KAYAK division.

== Partners ==
HotelCombination agreed to provide hotel results to Ecosia's subsidiary: Ecosia Travel.

== Technology ==
HotelsCombined is a hotel metasearch engine. Through partnerships with numerous online travel agencies and hotel chains, HotelsCombined allows users to search and compare hotel rates in one search. It also provides an aggregated summary of hotel reviews and ratings from external sites.

== Affiliate Program ==
HotelsCombined's Hotel Affiliate Program allows businesses to earn revenue by offering the hotel price comparison service on their website. Hotel content is available in over 42 languages, and the interface can be fully customized to allow businesses to retain their brand.

In April 2012, the company began a partnership with low-cost airline Ryanair to power their hotel price comparison service, RyanairHotels.com. HotelsCombined also powers the hotel search for the European flight comparison site momondo.com, as well as Travelsupermarket (part of Moneysupermarket), and many others across Europe, Middle East and the rest of the world.

== Awards ==
In 2010, HotelsCombined won TRAVELtech "Website of the Year" and was named a finalist in the Telstra 2010 Business Awards. In the same year, it was awarded ninth place in the Deloitte Technology Fast 500 Asia Pacific Ranking, and was declared one of the top 10 travel websites by guidebook author Arthur Frommer (of Frommers.com). In 2011, HotelsCombined was once more named one of the top 10 ranking Australian businesses in Deloitte's Technology Fast 50 Program. Also in 2011, the UK's The Independent named HotelsCombined one of the best money-saving websites while Pauline Frommer named it a "terrific resource".

On 30 November 2013, at the World Travel Awards, HotelsCombined won the "World's Leading Hotel Comparison Website 2013". In 2014, HotelsCombined was named as the "World's Leading Hotel Price Comparison Site" for the second consecutive year at the World Travel Awards.

== Media ==
The company's Hotel Price Trend reports, which show hotel price trends aggregated across major travel sites and hotel chains, have been covered in publications around the world including the L.A. Times, the Gulf Daily News and The Australian.
