= Robert Niblock =

Robert Alan Niblock was the chairman, president and CEO of Lowe's. He retired on July 2, 2018.

== Early life and education ==
Niblock is the youngest of four children and the first person in his immediate family to attend college. He worked to pay his own way through college, earning a bachelor's degree in accounting from the Belk College of Business at University of North Carolina, Charlotte. He is also a Certified Public Accountant.

== Career ==
Before Lowe's, Niblock had a nine-year career with accounting firm Ernst & Young.

Niblock joined Lowe's in 1993 and became, and has served as director of taxation, vice president and treasurer (1997–1998), senior vice president (1999–2000), executive vice president (2001–2003) and chief financial officer (2000–2003). From 2003 to 2006, he served as president of the company. He became a member of the board of directors in 2004 when he was named chairman and CEO-elect. In January 2005, he officially became chairman and chief executive officer. In 2011, he reassumed the title of president.

Niblock joined the Retail Industry Leaders Association in 2003. In that organization, he has served as its vice chairman (2006–2007) and chairman (2008–2009). As of January 2017, he is serving as secretary of the board.

Since February 2010, Niblock has served on the board of directors of ConocoPhillips, and also served on its audit and finance committee until May 2014. He is also on the board of directors of the Business for Educational Success and Transformation in North Carolina (BEST NC).

Niblock had also served on the board of directors of Hydrox Holdings until stepping down in September 2016. Hydrox Holdings was the joint venture that owned Masters Home Improvement prior to its demise.

== Honors ==
In 2015, he became the first presenter of the Belk College of Business CEO Speaker Series. After he spoke, donated 2.5 million dollars to name and support the Robert A. Niblock Student Center for Professional Development at Belk College.

In 2016, he was named an Influential Leader by the Association to Advance Collegiate Schools of Business.
