= BuyWithMe =

American online retailer

- Website type: Electronic Commerce
- Available in: English
- Owner: Gilt Groupe
- Website: www.buywithme.com
- Commercial: Yes
- Registration: None
- Launched: May, 2009
- Current status: Defunct

BuyWithMe was a social e-commerce company that was known as the first competitor to group buying website Groupon. Launched in Boston and then later based in New York City, BuyWithMe allowed consumers to leverage group buying power to get discounts with local merchants online.

BuyWithMe launched in May 2009 and was acquired by Gilt Groupe in November 2011, It was absorbed into Gilt Groupe's Gilt City daily deals division.

== History ==
In a similar manner to Groupon (except that their deals always lasted a week), BuyWithMe introduced at least one new deal every day. The deal was emailed to all local BuyWithMe subscribers, made available on the company's website, and distributed through a network of group buying media partnerships (including Boston.com, owned by The New York Times). The deal only completed if a minimum number of consumers signed up, therefore assuring the merchant a minimum return.

Initially founded by a group of local Boston-area friends, including Andrew Moss and Seth Rosen. In 2009 BuyWithMe raised $5.5M; and then 2010, BuyWithMe was funded with $36.5M by venture capital firms Matrix Partners, Bain Capital Ventures, and Pinnacle Ventures. BuyWithMe's first market was Boston, with San Diego and Washington, DC following. By October 2009, BuyWithMe served nine markets and its major competitor was Groupon. BuyWithMe had partners such as Foursquare. In January, the company appointed Jim Crowley as CEO. In June 2011, the company was pursuing a significant push into loyalty with an acquisition of a card-linked offer company. The sale to Gilt Groupe came as Crowley struggled to raise venture capital.

The BuyWithMe founding team went on to other businesses, including Booster by Custom Ink.
