= Kayak (company) =

American travel metasearch engine owned and operated by Booking Holdings

- Screenshot
- Website type: Subsidiary
- Available in: Arabic, Catalan, Chinese, Czech, Danish, Dutch, English, Finnish, French, German, Greek, Hebrew, Indonesian, Italian, Japanese, Korean, Malay, Norwegian, Polish, Portuguese, Romanian, Spanish, Swedish, Thai, Turkish, Ukrainian, Vietnamese
- Founded: January 14, 2004; 22 years ago
- Headquarters: Norwalk, Connecticut, United States
- Area served: Global
- Founders: Steve Hafner; Paul M. English
- Key people: Peer Bueller (CEO, 2026–present); Steve Hafner (Co-founder & Executive Chair, 2026–present)
- Industry: Technology, Travel (Metasearch)
- Products: Travel metasearch engine; KAYAK for Business; KAYAK.ai
- Revenue: US$292.7 million (2012)
- Parent: Booking Holdings (NASDAQ: BKNG)
- Subsidiaries: SWOODOO, checkfelix, momondo, Cheapflights, Mundi, HotelsCombined
- Website: www.kayak.com
- Launched: February 7, 2005 (Public)
- Native clients on: iOS, Android, watchOS, Amazon Alexa, Facebook Messenger

Kayak (styled as KAYAK) is an American metasearch engine for travel services, including airline flights, hotels, rental cars, and vacation packages. It is owned and operated by Booking Holdings.

Kayak's website and mobile apps are currently available in about 20 languages and 30 countries, including the United States, the United Kingdom, Canada, India, China, France, Germany, Italy, Spain, Russia, Switzerland, Norway, Sweden, Finland, the Netherlands, Australia, Ireland, Mexico, New Zealand, Belgium, Korea, Japan, and Singapore.

== Company History and Key Milestones ==
Kayak was founded in January 2004 by Steve Hafner and Paul M. English. Hafner previously co-founded Orbitz.

The company was originally named Travel Search Company, Inc. and the name was changed to Kayak Software Corporation in August 2004.

The website launched in February 2005.

In December 2007, Kayak raised $196 million in financing from a group of investors including General Catalyst, Sequoia Capital, Accel Partners, and Oak Investment Partners. Using that funding, Kayak acquired SideStep, another online travel agency.

On March 5, 2010, Kayak sold certain assets related to TravelPost.

In May 2010, Kayak acquired German travel search platform Swoodoo.

In January 2011, Kayak shut down SideStep and redirected SideStep traffic to Kayak.com.

In April 2011, Kayak acquired all of the outstanding shares of JaBo Vertrieb-und Entwicklung GmbH, or JaBo Software, operator Checkfelix, a travel search engine in Austria.

On July 20, 2012, Kayak became a public company via an initial public offering. On its first day of trading on the NASDAQ stock exchange under the symbol KYAK, Kayak opened at $26 per share and closed at $33.18 per share.

On May 21, 2013, Booking Holdings, then known as Priceline.com, acquired the company for $2.1 billion.

=== Post-acquisition ===
In September 2013, Kayak announced an office move to the Harbor Point district of Stamford, aided by a $2.5 million loan from the state of Connecticut.

In 2016 KAYAK launched voice search on Amazon Alexa.

After Booking Holdings acquired Momondo Group for $550 million, KAYAK added momondo and Cheapflights to its portfolio of brands in 2017.

In 2017, the company acquired Mundi, a Brazilian flight metasearch company.

In 2018, Kayak assumed leadership of Hotels Combined, which was acquired by parent company, Booking Holdings.

In 2024, Kayak added fares from Southwest Airlines to its listings.

=== Technology and Products ===
Kayak has developed several AI-powered features for travel planning. In 2016, the company launched a voice search skill for Amazon Alexa. In 2024, Kayak added price checking and AI-powered recommendations tools to its platform.

In early 2023, Kayak released a plug-in for ChatGPT, allowing users to search for flights and hotels through the chatbot. In April 2025, Kayak launched Kayak AI as a beta tool offering real-time travel information in a chat-based interface. The company later integrated AI Mode into its main platform in October 2026, enabling users to search and book travel through conversational queries.

=== Milestones ===
- October 2004: Kayak launched a public beta version of its website in the United States.
- February 2005: The site launched to the public after about four months in beta.
- 2008: Kayak's annual revenue reached about US$100 million.
- March 2009: Kayak released its first mobile app.
- June 2010: Kayak introduced Explore, a map-based tool for browsing destinations by price.
- January 2012: Kayak processed 100 million search queries in a single month.
- July 2012: Kayak held its initial public offering on the Nasdaq under the ticker symbol KYAK. Shares were priced at $26 and closed their first day of trading at $33.18.
- May 2013: The Priceline Group (now Booking Holdings) completed its acquisition of Kayak for approximately $1.8 billion.
- May 2016: Kayak released a skill for Amazon Alexa in the United States.
- July 2017: Momondo and Cheapflights became part of Kayak's group of brands after Priceline acquired the Momondo Group.
- September 2018: Kayak added support for Siri Shortcuts to its iOS app.
- December 2018: HotelsCombined became part of Kayak's group of brands.
- February 2021: Kayak soft-launched Kayak for Business, a corporate travel booking tool.
- April 2021: Kayak opened its first branded hotel, Kayak Miami Beach, in Miami Beach, Florida, in partnership with Life House.
- November 2021: Kayak opened two branded properties in Playa del Carmen, Mexico.
- January 2022: Southwest Airlines became a partner of Kayak for Business.
- May 2022: Kayak announced a partnership with the vacation rental distributor Rentals United.
- March 2023: Kayak launched a plugin for ChatGPT.
- September 2023: Kayak for Business launched an enterprise product, developed with PwC.
- March 2024: Kayak introduced PriceCheck and Ask Kayak, two AI-based search features.
- August 2024: Southwest Airlines fares began appearing in Kayak search results.
- April 2025: Kayak launched KAYAK.ai, a site for testing AI features.
- October 2025: Kayak launched AI Mode, which supports natural-language search.

== Tools ==
=== Price alerts ===
In 2006, KAYAK launched a price tracking tool, originally named "Fare Watch". The tool monitors price changes for flights, hotels and rental cars. It sends push notifications to users when prices change.

=== Trips and mobile apps ===
In 2009, KAYAK added "My Trips", later renamed "Trips". Users can use it to organize itineraries and share them with other people. In the same year, the company released a mobile app for iOS and Android. The app includes flight status tracking, airline contact details, trip statistics and Siri Shortcuts support. KAYAK states that the app is available in 175 countries and more than 25 languages.

In August 2015, KAYAK released an Apple Watch app. It shows flight status, hotel information and upcoming trips, and it works offline.

=== Search tools ===
In 2010, KAYAK launched "KAYAK Explore". The tool lists destinations that fit a traveler's budget and travel dates.

In 2019, KAYAK introduced its unique aircraft filter, which lets users filter flights by plane model. The feature received new media attention in 2024 following the Alaska Airlines Flight 1282 incident.

In March 2020, KAYAK introduced flexible date filters. Users can compare prices for different dates in a table.

In May 2023, KAYAK launched "Best Time to Travel". The tool suggests a month to visit a chosen destination. It uses KAYAK search data to forecast flight and hotel prices, and it compares the forecasts with weather and seasonal information. In December 2023, Globetrender reported that KAYAK added ChatGPT to the tool. ChatGPT suggests an alternative month based on the experiences available at the destination.

== Awards ==
In 2013, Travel + Leisure included Kayak's app in its list of the Best Apps for Business Travelers as well as its list for the Best Apps for websites and travelers.

Time named Kayak on its list of the 50 Best Websites of 2009.

Mashable included Kayak in first place for the website's list, "10 Budget Airfare Tools Every Traveler Should Know in 2012".

Kayak won the following Webby Awards:

- 2008: People's Voice award in the travel website category.
- 2009: The Webby Award in the travel website category.
- 2011: The People's Voice award in the mobile travel app category in 2011.
- 2012: 3 awards: both the Webby and People's Choice awards in the travel website category, and the People's Voice award in the mobile travel app category.
- 2013: Nominee for Best Travel Mobile & App for Handheld Devices.
- 2014: both the People's Voice and Webby Award in the Travel category for Tablets.
- 2015: Kayak Mobile won again the People's Voice Award in the Travel category.

The World Travel Awards presented Kayak with the World's Leading Flight Comparison Website award in 2013 and the World's Leading Travel Search Website award in 2011.

== All-American Muslim advertising ==
In December 2011, Kayak announced that it would not renew a contract to advertise on the TLC reality television show All-American Muslim. The decision followed a campaign by the Florida Family Association, a one-man fundamentalist organization focused on “defending American values". In a statement posted to the Kayak website, Kayak Chief Marketing Officer, Robert Birge, wrote that TLC “was not upfront with us about the nature of the show”.
