= Neha Parikh =

Indian-American business executive

- Born: 1980 (age 45–46); Houston, Texas
- Citizenship: American
- Education: University of Texas, Austin
- Occupations: Entrepreneur, businesswoman, investor

Neha Parikh is an Indian-American business executive. In June 2021, Parikh became CEO of Waze, a subsidiary of Google. Prior to becoming CEO of Waze, Neha was the President of Hotwire within the Expedia Group until 2020. Neha currently serves as a Member of the Board of Directors for Carvana.

== Career ==
=== Hotels.com ===
Parikh joined Hotels.com in 2008 as a Product Manager. She was eventually promoted to Senior Vice President, Hotels.com Global Brands & Retail in 2015. In 2017, Parikh became President of Hotwire, which is part of the Expedia Group, a role she served in until 2020 . At the time, Parikh was Expedia's youngest and first female President.

=== Carvana ===
Parikh joined the Board of Directors of Carvana (NYSE:CVNA) in April 2019. She currently serves on their Audit and Compensation and Nominating committees.

=== Waze ===
When Parikh joined Waze as CEO in June 2021, she replaced Noam Bardin, who stepped down in November 2020 as the CEO after leading the company for 12 years. In December 2022 it was announced Parikh would be leaving the role upon the organizational merger between Waze and Google Maps, and she officially left in July 2023 following that integration.

== Education ==
Parikh holds a bachelor's degree from the University of Texas and a Master of Business Administration from the Kellogg School of Management.

== Personal life ==
Neha is married and lives with her husband in New York City.
