= CanadaStays =

Canadian online marketplace

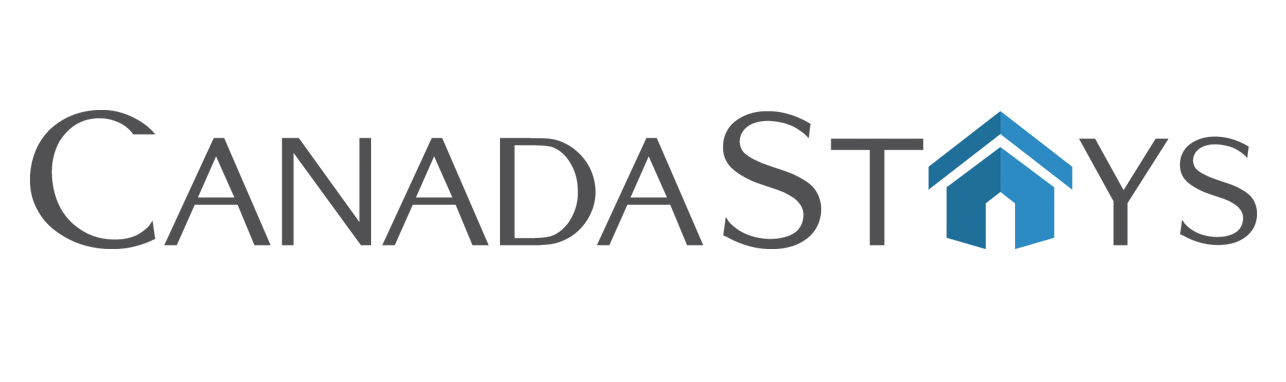
- Type: Private
- Industry: Travel
- Founded: 2008
- Founders: Mark Bordo
- Headquarters: Canada
- Key people: Mark Bordo (Founder)
- Services: Vacation Rentals
- Parent: Expedia Group
- Website: www.canadastays.com

CanadaStays was a Canadian online marketplace for short-term vacation rental properties, with over 250,000 cottages, cabins, chalets and condos available to rent across Canada, the US, the Caribbean, Mexico and South America. Founded in Toronto in 2008, CanadaStays became Canada's largest vacation rental marketplace, with over $24MM in bookings reported in 2017. In August 2019, CanadaStays was acquired by Expedia Group and integrated into its VRBO vacation rental brand.

== History ==
CanadaStays was founded in Toronto in 2008 by Mark Bordo under the name CottageCountry, with the aim of creating a remote rental marketplace for owners looking to rent their properties in Canada. When the company was founded, many considered the rental market in rural Canada to be a cottage industry. Many competitors such as HomeAway and FlipKey only offered urban property rental in Canada. The opportunity allowed CanadaStays to become the main platform across Canada.

The company launch came from one of the founder's poor experiences at trying to find a vacation rental for his family. The initial strategy deployed by the company was to make it easier for Canadian families to book remote vacation rentals, while also making the service more reliable than competitors. Two main methods of improvement were adding a high number of quality photos and also long descriptions about the rentals.

The Globe & Mail covered the cottage rental industry in 2012, citing CottageCountry as a major player alongside other free services such as Craigslist. The industry of vacation rentals saw a boom during this time, with sites such as CottageCountry providing a great return on investment, with "most cottages rent for at least $1,000 per week", according to The Globe and Mail.

CottageCountry received a rebrand in 2014 and would operate under its new name, CanadaStays. Part of the reason was due to the language barriers between French and English, with many French-speaking Canadians not used to using the term "cottage". With the rebrand, the company also changed their strategy. The strategy change was to focus on republishing listed vacation rentals on third-party websites. The strategy was said to expand viewers and potential bookings for its clients, with up to 2.5 million unique visitors per month viewing each listing.

In late 2014, the company was listed as the largest provider of vacation rentals in Canada. In the 12 months prior to the announcement, the company nearly doubled its property listings on its website. This growth meant that the company had vacation listings on nearly all of Canada's lakes, which total around 30,000.

During 2015, the company founder featured on Business News Network, speaking about market demand for cottages in Canada. During the same year, HomeAway invested $4.9 million in CanadaStays to increase the number of Canadian properties from less than 10,000 to more than 220,000. The partnership makes HomeAway a minority stakeholder in CanadaStays.

In 2016, CanadaStays opened a second office in Montreal, QC.

In 2017, CanadaStays reported growing Canadian demand for vacation rentals after seeing a 74% increase in bookings and rising trip values over the course of the year. The company was also featured in the Daily Hive, which published a list of Canada's most in-demand vacation rental destinations based on CanadaStays' 2017 search and booking data.

In 2019, CanadaStays was acquired by Expedia Group, which expanded its vacation rental services with rival HomeAway.

== Mechanics ==
The website offers its services throughout Canada, acting as a broker for vacation rentals. People looking to rent out their vacation home, whether it be a cabin, cottage, chalet, condo, or bed and breakfast, are provided with two ways of listing their home. The first is a subscription model where the property owner pays CanadaStays an annual fee to list. The second is for people who only rent out their property periodically and pay a commission on each rental booking they receive through the website. The company does not own or manage any of the rental properties listed on the platform.

== See also ==
- Holiday cottage
