= Traveler IQ Challenge =

- Developer(s): Travelpod
- Publisher(s): Travelpod
- Programmer(s): Luc Levesque
- Platform(s): Browser
- Release: 2006
- Genre(s): Geography
- Mode(s): Multiplayer

Traveler IQ Challenge is a 2006 geography game created by the Canadian developer Travelpod.

== Gameplay ==
In Traveler IQ, players are given cities and must pin their location as close as possible within 10 seconds. Once a round is finished, the game states the number of kilometers off from the actual distance; shorter distances earn more points.

== Development ==
Traveler IQ Challenge gameplay

The Wall Street Journal explained that the game was "created as a marketing gimmick in June by TravelPod, a travel Web site owned by Expedia". It noted that Traveler IQ Challenge fit into the growing category of casual games and contextually came at a time when there was a "renewed interest in geography, stimulated by new technologies like GPS satellite-based navigation devices and Google Earth".

Luc Levesque, a Canadian programmer, traveler, and founder of TravelPod, was inspired by a game he played on long train trips where he "would randomly name a country and one of his travel companions would attempt to name another country or capital city that starts with the third letter of the previous country's name". After Facebook opened up its site, so independent developers could create games for the social networking site, "Two programmers created the game for TravelPod in just under three weeks".

In 2007, Traveler IQ had "more than four million people a month who play it on sites across the Internet, including Facebook's popular social network". As a result of the game, Travelpod saw "huge increases in registrations and traffic".

== Reception ==
Geographer at the University of Kansas, Jerome Dobson, despite not having played the game, said "new technological applications like Traveler IQ are helping to revive geography after a decades-long decline in the teaching of the subject in U.S. schools". TeachersFirst said "This challenging geography website is sure to excite your students as they click their way throughout the world", and noted its classroom potential.
