= Gabrielle Miller (Australian actress) =

Australian actress

- Born: July 1986 (age 40); Coffs Harbour, New South Wales, Australia
- Occupations: Actress, performance artist, musician, tap dancer, mime, puppeteer
- Years active: 2006–present
- Spouse: Will Henderson

Gabrielle Miller (born July 1986) is an Australian actress, performance artist, musician, tap dancer, mime and puppeteer. She is well known for her appearances in advertisements for the Germany-based hotel website Trivago, which are seen in Australia, New Zealand, Hong Kong, United Kingdom, Ireland, United States, South Africa and the Arab states of the Persian Gulf.

== Early years ==
Born in the New South Wales coastal city of Coffs Harbour, Miller spent her childhood travelling in a caravan with her two brothers, accompanying her parents whose job as screeners for breast cancer took them to remote communities around Australia. The family ultimately settled in Cairns where she finished school and lived until age 17.

== Performing career ==
Miller became a performer when she was about 20 and described, in an interview, that her "proudest self-devised work includes WunderWagon, a visual anthology starring objects that I created in Papua New Guinea; AC/DC meets Rocky Horror cabaret, If You Want Blood; the dementia dissecting comedic tragedy, Baba; my swing-jazz band Zap, an absurd mixture of sounds and performance". She also mentioned that "I did a terrible audition" for her favorite TV series, Home & Away.

At the end of 2012 she moved to Germany and, while living in Berlin, frequently travels around the world with her band Zap, which she describes as "a crazy mixture of swing, jazz music, performance and weird percussion" consisting of "a washboard, megaphone, ukulele, rubber chicken, some tap shoes, a trumpet, two kangaroos and some tzatziki", including her role as "sequined showgirl meets sideshow superstar with a bottomless bag of tricks – whether it be dancing, juggling or throwing confetti".

While in Australia, Miller co-starred in writer-director Laura Smith's 2012 short film The Outback Motel and, in 2015, played one of two female characters in writer-director Berton Pierce's Irish-German science fiction road film Adventurados. In 2016, she worked on two episodes of the German comedy series Big Heads which uses, for satirical effect, oversized replicas of celebrities' and politicians' heads. She has also appeared in music videos Jonathan Jeremiah – Lazin' In The Sunshine and Kooii – Circle in the Sun (both 2012), Denk mal an Berlin e.V. – Unser Erbe ist ein Teil unserer Zukunft, VonLewald – Aerobic Rider and Faun – Walpurgis Nacht (all three in 2014) The Lips – I Got a Hole in Me (2015) as well as The Lips – Trouble in Paradise (2016).

She co-starred in avant-garde director and choreographer Michael Laub's production of Fassbinder, Faust and the Animists which opened in Berlin on 28 June 2017.

== Trivago commercials ==
Miller recounts that she received the invitation to audition for Trivago while touring in Greece. She was camped on a naturist beach, on the island of Crete, where she filmed a "rough version of the script". She has estimated that the number of her Trivago commercials is "close to 20", but that "not all have been released". They were produced in Berlin and Melbourne in a series of four- to five-day shoots. Newspaper stories have portrayed her as a replacement for the long-established "Trivago Guy", Tim Williams, who had been the commercial face of the travel site since 2013.

== Filmography ==
Year	Title	Director	Notes
2010	Dancing on the Inside	Craig Proudly	leading role in film clip
2010	Forensic Investigators	Amy Tuck	Australian TV series
2011	Underbelly: Razor	Jim Daily	Australian TV series
2011	The Outback Motel	Laura Smith	leading role in short film, shot in South Australia outback, which premiered at BFI London Film Festival
2014	Adventurados	Berton Pierce	leading role in feature film
2014	Rosenkind	Franziska Margarete Hoenisch	leading role in short film
2015	Real Soldiers	Andrew English	short film
2016	Big Heads	Marlene Melchior; Alex Forge	one episode of German web series: "May 1st Berlin"
