= Fastic =

Intermittent fasting app

- Developer(s): HealthVida GmbH & Co. KG.
- Initial release: 2019
- Operating system: Android, iOS
- Available in: 6 languages
- List of languages English, French, German, Italian, Portuguese, Spanish
- Type: Health, Fitness
- License: Proprietary software
- Website: fastic.com

Fastic is an intermittent fasting app for iOS and Android launched by Fastic GmbH in 2019. In 2020, it became one of the most successful health and fitness apps.

== Overview ==
The app Fastic is operated by Fastic GmbH. The app uses a freemium model and provides fasting and meal plans, a nutrition tracker, advice on fasting and nutrition, as well as support from coaches. The app is available in six languages in over 150 countries and is used by over 10 million users worldwide. It is available on Android and iOS platforms.

== History ==
Fastic was founded in 2019 by Sebastian Wettcke and Phillipp Wayman in Dresden. As a teenager, Wettcke worked at his parents' fasting hotel in the Black Forest, where he advised hotel guests on their diets. He started an online shop for fasting advice and products together with Phillipp Wayman. In 2019, Wettcke and Wayman founded Fastic GmbH in Dresden and launched the Fastic app. In late December, the company moved its headquarters to Berlin.

In December 2019, the Fastic app launched in the United States, accumulating over a million users in 4 months.

In April 2020, demand for the app increased due to the lockdown caused by the COVID-19 pandemic, and the app was downloaded a total of 8 million times that year. Fastic reached the top of the app charts for the first time during Covid and became one of the most successful health and fitness apps in several countries.

In its seed round of funding, Fastic raised 5 million euros from investors such as Trivago founder Rolf Schrömgens.
