= Venere.com =

Online hotel reservation platform

- Industry: Travel, Hotel
- Founded: 1995; 31 years ago
- Founder: Matteo Fago; Marco Bellacci; Renata Sarno; Gianandrea Strekelj
- Defunct: December 1, 2016; 9 years ago (redirected to Hotels.com)
- Headquarters: Rome, Italy
- Key people: Johan Svanstrom (President)
- Number of employees: 150
- Parent: Expedia Group
- Website: venere.com

Venere.com was a website focusing on online hotel reservations. Its listing included various types of accommodation. Venere.com started in the year 1994 as Venere Net Srl, an online travel agency based in Rome, Italy. In 2008, it was acquired by Expedia Group. The president of the company was Johan Svanstrom.

== History ==
In 1994, four partners launched Venere.com and developed the first beta version of the hotel booking engine. In February 1995, the first marketing activities were launched for hotels in Rome and Florence. The first reservation arrived in June 1995. In 2001, Venere.com became a Joint Stock Company (Venere Net SPA) and opened international offices in London (Venere UK LTD) and Paris (Venere France SARL).

In 2007, the global private equity firm Advent International acquired a 60% stake in Venere Net. Expedia acquired 100% of Venere.com in 2008. In 2008, Venere.com acquired the Italian online hotel booking agency Worldby.com.
