= Hotels.com =

Website for booking hotel rooms online and by telephone

Hotels.com, L.P.
- Formerly: Hotel Reservations Network
- Type: Subsidiary
- Industry: Hotel booking service
- Founded: 1991; 35 years ago in Dallas, Texas, U.S.
- Founder: David Litman; Robert Diener
- Parent: Expedia Group
- Website: hotels.com

Hotels.com, L.P. is a website for booking hotel rooms owned by Expedia Group. Hotels.com was established in 1991 as the Hotel Reservations Network (HRN) and in 2002 changed its name to Hotels.com.

== History ==
Old logo of Hotels.com used from 2002 to 2008

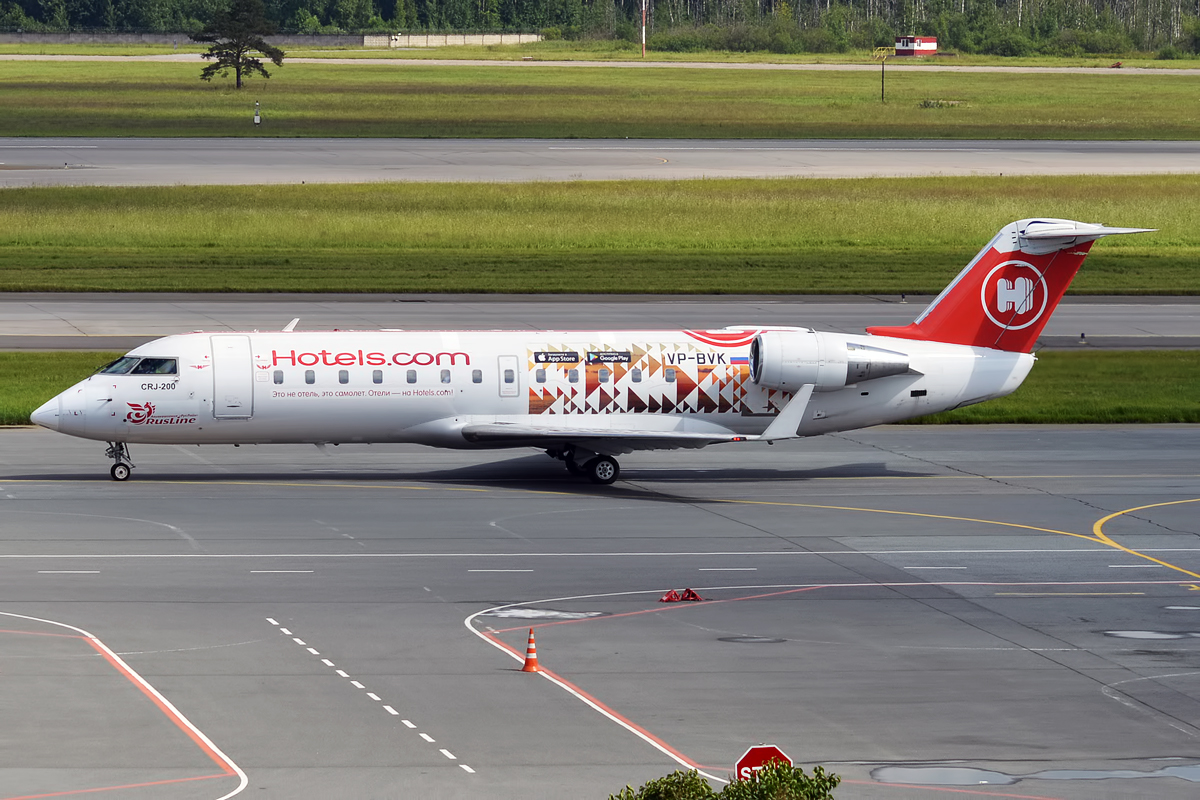
Hotels.com RusLine CRJ100 logojet at Pulkovo Airport (2017)

Hotels.com was established in 1991 by David Litman and Robert Diener as the Hotel Reservations Network (HRN), providing hotel booking via a toll-free phone number in the United States. In 2001, the company was acquired by USA Networks Inc (USAI) which also acquired a controlling interest in Expedia, an online travel booking company.

After buying the domain name for approximately US$11 million, HRN changed its name in 2002 to Hotels.com and launched the offline brand 1-800-2-Hotels as well as allowing hotel bookings on line. There followed a period of rapid international expansion with 29 sites added over the next two years. In 2003, USAI was renamed InterActiveCorp (IAC). In 2005 IAC separated its travel business under the name Expedia Inc. Hotels.com then became an operating company of Expedia Inc.

In 2006, Hotels.com experienced a data breach when a laptop containing personal information of approximately 243,000 customers was stolen. The compromised data included names, addresses, and credit card information. There was no evidence of fraudulent activity. In 2007, a class action lawsuit was filed by two wheelchair users for the inability to make a reservation that guaranteed wheelchair accessible rooms arguing that it violates California's Unruh Civil Rights Act. As a part of settlement, Hotels.com agreed to make changes to facilitate booking accessible rooms.

On December 1, 2016, Hotels.com took over Venere.com (another Expedia owned company).

In 2019, it was reported that the Hotels.com mobile app used session-replay technology from Israeli firm Glassbox, which recorded user activity and sent data to Expedia servers without explicit user consent.

== Loyalty program ==
The first loyalty program for Hotels.com was called "Hotels.com Rewards" and rolled out across multiple countries from 2008 to 2011. In 2023, Expedia Group launched One Key, a loyalty program for Expedia, Hotels.com, and Vrbo, allowing members to earn OneKeyCash redeemable across the three brands.

Hotels.com also offers member-only discounts for customers enrolled in the membership program, as well as price alerts and "VIP Access" properties offering additional rewards.

Earning rates under the OneKey program, which went into effect in July 2023 with a reward earning rate of 2% is described as " significantly less value" than the previous Hotels.com's one free night with ten nights of stay.

== Advertising ==
Ed Helms voiced the character "Smart" in Hotels.com advertisements. In 2012, the character was changed from clay animation to CGI. The company's advertising slogan was originally "Smart. So Smart" before being changed to "Be Smart. Book Smart".

In 2014, Smart was eventually replaced by "Captain Obvious" who is portrayed by actor Brandon Moynihan. Captain Obvious makes self-evident comments with the aim of communicating that Hotels.com is the obvious choice. The campaign was devised by the ad firm Crispin Porter + Bogusky. Moynihan said in an interview "Hotels.com has a great self awareness and they're not afraid to push the envelope with the crazy stuff I get to do as Captain Obvious". Notable advertisements include one where he runs for president, a La La Land inspired ad and an ad where Captain Obvious meets his future self. In 2018, Captain Obvious featured in Channel 4's ad blocking campaign. In 2019, Captain Obvious appeared as a DJ in an episode of Four Weddings and a Funeral.

== See also ==
- DDR Holdings v. Hotels.com
