= Wotif =

Hotel reservation website

- Type: Subsidiary
- Traded as: ASX: WTF
- Industry: Hotel reservation service
- Founded: March 2003; 23 years ago
- Founder: Graeme Wood
- Headquarters: Brisbane, Australia
- Key people: Daniel Finch (CEO)
- Parent: Expedia
- Website: www.wotif.com

Wotif is a website that provides a reservation service for hotels in Australia and international destinations across the globe. It was set up in March 2000 by Graeme Wood in Brisbane, Australia. It has since established offices in Canada, Malaysia, New Zealand, Singapore and the United Kingdom. Wotif.com was listed on the Australian Stock Exchange on 2 June 2006, but unlisted when it was acquired by Expedia.

Wotif provides information for the coming three months. Originally details were provided seven days in advance, expanded to 14 days in February 2001, to 28 in September 2005 (around the time it first sought a listing on the Australian Securities Exchange), and later to 3 months.

In October 2007, Robbie Cooke became CEO, taking over from founder Graeme Wood, who moved to the position of executive director.

In October 2007, Wotif acquired Australian travel website Travel.com.au for $57 million.

In July 2014, Expedia agreed to buy Wotif for about US$657 million ($AU703 million); this was approved by the Australian Competition & Consumer Commission on 1 October 2014.

== Awards ==
In 2009 as part of the Q150 celebrations, Wotif was announced as one of the Q150 Icons of Queensland for its role as an iconic "innovation and invention".
