= Spencer Rascoff =

American businessman

- Born: October 24, 1975 (age 50)
- Education: Harvard University
- Occupation: Chief executive officer of Match Group
- Notable work: Co-founder of Zillow Group, Pacaso, and Hotwire.com
- Spouse: Nanci Rascoff
- Children: 3

Spencer Rascoff (born October 24, 1975) is an American entrepreneur and businessman who serves as the chief executive officer of Match Group. He is the co-founder of Zillow Group, Pacaso, dot.la, Hotwire.com, and has created multiple startups through 75 & Sunny Ventures, his family office.

== Early life and education ==
Rascoff was born to Jane and Joseph Rascoff. His father was a business manager and tour producer for numerous well known musicians including the Rolling Stones, U2, and Paul Simon. Rascoff grew up in New York and then Los Angeles, where he attended Harvard-Westlake. He received a degree in 1997 from Harvard University.

== Career ==
After graduating from college, Rascoff worked as a private equity investor at TPG Capital and also as an investment banker at Goldman Sachs.

In 1999, at the age of 24, Rascoff co-founded Hotwire.com, a leading Internet travel company, which a few years later was sold to InterActiveCorp for $685 million. Rascoff then served as vice president of lodging for Expedia before leaving to co-found Zillow.

Rascoff served various roles through the years, including chief operating officer, chief financial officer, and VP of Marketing until his appointment to CEO in 2010. As CEO, Rascoff led Zillow through its 2011 IPO and 15 acquisitions. In 2015, he co-wrote and published his first book, Zillow Talk: Rewriting the Rules of Real Estate, which became a New York Times best seller. In 2017, Rascoff was named "The Most Powerful Person in Residential Real Estate" by the Swanepoel Power 200. Rascoff stepped down from his CEO position in February 2019. In April 2020, Rascoff resigned from Zillow's board of directors.

In January 2020, Rascoff co-founded dot.la, a news site for the California tech startup industry. In that same year, Rascoff held the position of Visiting Executive Professor at Harvard Business School, where he co-created and co-taught the “Managing Tech Ventures” course.

In October 2020, Rascoff co-founded Pacaso, alongside Austin Allison. Pacaso is positioned as a real estate platform that makes second home ownership more accessible through shared ownership. Pacaso has been described by some as an alternative take on the timeshare model of property ownership.

In June 2021, Rascoff co-founded Recon Food with his daughter, Sophia Rascoff. The app uses technology to search a user's camera roll for all previous food-related photos and automatically upload them to the app.

In February 2023, Rascoff co-founded Replify (previously known as heyLibby), an artificial intelligence-based customer service and sales software suite, with Tony Small and Anna Rodriguez.

In February 2025, Rascoff was appointed Chief Executive Officer of Match Group by the board of directors. In the next month, Rascoff commented on the state of Match Group’s apps via an open letter on LinkedIn, stating that the apps "have felt like a numbers game rather than a place to build real connections". In expressing the desire to change that sentiment, he asked employees to share their feedback about the apps confidentially. During Rascoff’s tenure with Match Group, artificial intelligence was implemented in product development across its brands. He also made efforts to reduce Match Group’s overhead, cutting its workforce by 13%, which equated to roughly $100 million per year. In July 2025, Rascoff replaced Faye Iosotaluno as chief executive officer at Tinder. While leading Tinder, Rascoff oversaw the implementation of the Double Date, College Mode, Face Check, and AI-based message filtering features as the company shifted its focus to the Gen Z demographic. The company also changed its delivery schedule for shipping code from twice-monthly to weekly.

Through the third quarter of 2025, the company’s stock performance under Rascoff improved, beating revenue estimations.

=== Board positions ===
Rascoff has previously served on the boards of various companies, including Palantir, TripAdvisor, and Zulily.

== Bibliography ==
- Zillow Talk: Rewriting the Rules of Real Estate (2015) ISBN 9781455574766

== Personal life ==
Rascoff is married to his wife, Nanci. They have three children. In 2025, Rascoff was recognized by the Los Angeles Business Journal in the publication’s LA500.
