= Pacaso =

American property broker company

- Company type: Private
- Industry: Real estate
- Founded: October 1, 2020; 5 years ago
- Headquarters: San Francisco, California, United States
- Key people: Austin Allison, Spencer Rascoff
- Number of employees: 200+
- Website: pacaso.com

Pacaso is a privately held American real estate company based in San Francisco, California. Founded in 2020 by former Zillow executives Austin Allison and Spencer Rascoff, the company facilitates co-ownership of single-family homes by purchasing properties and selling fractional shares to multiple buyers.

== History ==
Austin Allison and Spencer Rascoff, ex-Zillow executives, co-founded the start-up in October 2020 in Silicon Valley, California.

Pacaso’s valuation rose to $1.5 billion in September 2021 following a $125 million funding round led by SoftBank Group. Other investors include Greycroft Partners and Global Founders Capital. In September 2024, Pacaso launched a Regulation A+ equity crowdfunding round aimed at raising up to $75 million from retail investors. Pacaso is reported to have separately obtained $1 billion in debt financing.

As of May 2024, the company is active in nearly 40 markets in the U.S., as well as in the United Kingdom, Mexico, and France.

== Business model ==
Pacaso operates on a fractional ownership model. The company purchases single-family homes, performs light renovations, furnishes them, and transfers each property into a dedicated limited liability company (LLC). Ownership of the LLC is divided into up to eight shares, which are then sold through Pacaso's platform.

Each share entitles the owner to use the property for up to 44 nights per year, with a maximum stay of 14 consecutive nights per visit. Owners can also assign their time to friends or family. Pacaso provides a mobile application to manage scheduling and oversees property management, maintenance, and cleaning.

The company charges a 12% service fee on the initial purchase price and collects monthly management fees. Shareholders are required to hold their interest for a minimum of one year, after which they may resell their share, potentially realizing gains or losses based on changes in the property's value.

A 2025 study by the Bay Area Council Economic Institute found that Pacaso homes in California had an 89% occupancy rate, compared to 39% for traditional second homes. The report noted higher local spending, increased tax revenue, and more consistent support for local businesses.

== Criticism ==
Pacaso has encountered opposition from some local communities. In Sonoma County, residents have advocated for stricter regulations on co-ownership arrangements, expressing concerns that such models could undermine the area's sense of community. Co-founder Austin Allison has stated that some early resistance stemmed from confusion between Pacaso’s model and short-term rental platforms such as Airbnb.
