= Expedia =

Online travel agency and metasearch engine

Expedia Inc.
- Company type: Subsidiary
- Website type: Travel agency; Metasearch engine
- Owner: Expedia Group
- General manager: Tracey Weber
- Website: expedia.com
- Commercial: Yes
- Registration: Yes
- Launched: October 22, 1996; 30 years ago
- Current status: Active

Expedia Inc. is an American online travel agency owned by Expedia Group, which is headquartered in Seattle, Washington. When Microsoft Corporation launched Expedia on the Microsoft Network in October 1996, it was the first online travel service to be offered by a major technology company, allowing consumers to make air, car, and hotel reservations online and to browse a library of multimedia travel guides. Expedia was founded on October 22, 1996, inside Microsoft in Redmond, Washington, led by Richard (Rich) Barton and a small team who saw an opportunity to bring transparent airfare, hotel, and car booking directly to consumers without travel agents.

Through its website and mobile app, customers can book airline tickets, hotel reservations, car rentals, cruise ships, activities, and vacation rentals. Once operating solely as Expedia.com, the group gradually acquired a wide range of travel brands, including Vrbo, Hotels.com, and Trivago, becoming the second-largest online travel agency worldwide, just behind Booking Holdings. Expedia is the lead travel app in the US market, with 19.3% market share, and operates over 200 travel websites.

== History ==
Microsoft launched the first public beta of the Expedia booking engine in October 1996, positioning it as a consumer complement to its MSN portal. After early traffic growth, Microsoft announced plans to float the unit; the initial public offering on 10 November 1999 was priced at US$14 and the shares closed the first day at US$37, valuing the business at more than US$2 billion.

In July 2001, Barry Diller’s USA Network (later IAC/InterActiveCorp) agreed to purchase a 75 % stake in Expedia for about US$1.5 billion, marking one of the first large-scale Internet travel acquisitions. IAC took full control in 2003 and subsequently consolidated its various travel holdings. Shareholder pressure to unlock value led IAC to spin off its travel division as a standalone, Nasdaq-listed company, Expedia Inc., on 9 August 2005.

During the late 2000s Expedia broadened its portfolio with brands such as Hotels.com, Hotwire, Vrbo and regional OTAs. In April 2011 the company announced plans to separate its user-generated-content unit TripAdvisor; analysts welcomed the move and Expedia shares rose 11 %.

In February 2020, chairman Barry Diller ordered a cost-cutting programme that eliminated about 3,000 jobs (≈12 % of staff) after characterising the organisation as “bloated and sclerotic.”

Expedia, Hotels.com, and Vrbo share a loyalty program called One Key, which launched in July 2023.

In 2025, Expedia was the first online travel agency to partner with Southwest Airlines to start selling tickets on behalf of the airline.

== Criticism and legal issues ==
=== Delays in refunds of flights cancelled due to COVID-19 ===
In 2020, during the COVID-19 pandemic, customers complained regarding the process to get refunds for cancelled flights. Customers complained of excessively long call times and being unable to get through to a representative. This led to many lawsuits.

=== False advertising and trademark violation ===
In August 2016, Buckeye Tree Lodge and Sequoia Village Inn, LLC filed a class-action lawsuit in California accusing the company and its partners of violating trademark rights of numerous independent hotel and motel establishments by running advertising implying that consumers could book reservations for those hotels on Expedia even though Expedia had no relationship with those hotels, in violation of the Lanham Act, and also falsely noting that hotels with which the company had no relationship were "sold out". In April 2021, the lawsuit was settled and the company promised not to engage in false advertising.

=== Listings in Israeli settlements ===
Expedia, along with other travel companies, such as Booking.com and TripAdvisor, has been criticized by activists and NGOs, such as Amnesty International, for offering holiday apartments in illegal Israeli settlements under international law in the occupied West Bank.

In February 2026, a coalition of Spanish civil society organisations filed a criminal complaint in the courts of Madrid against eDreams ODIGEO, Booking.com, and an Expedia subsidiary. The complaint alleged money laundering from proceeds linked to war crimes in occupied Palestinian and Syrian territories, invoking Articles 301 and 611 of the Spanish Penal Code and Spain's Royal Decree-Law 10/2025, adopted in September 2025, which prohibits the advertising of services in occupied territories.

== See also ==
- Holiday cottage
- Vacation rental
