= Down Neck =

- The Sopranos episode
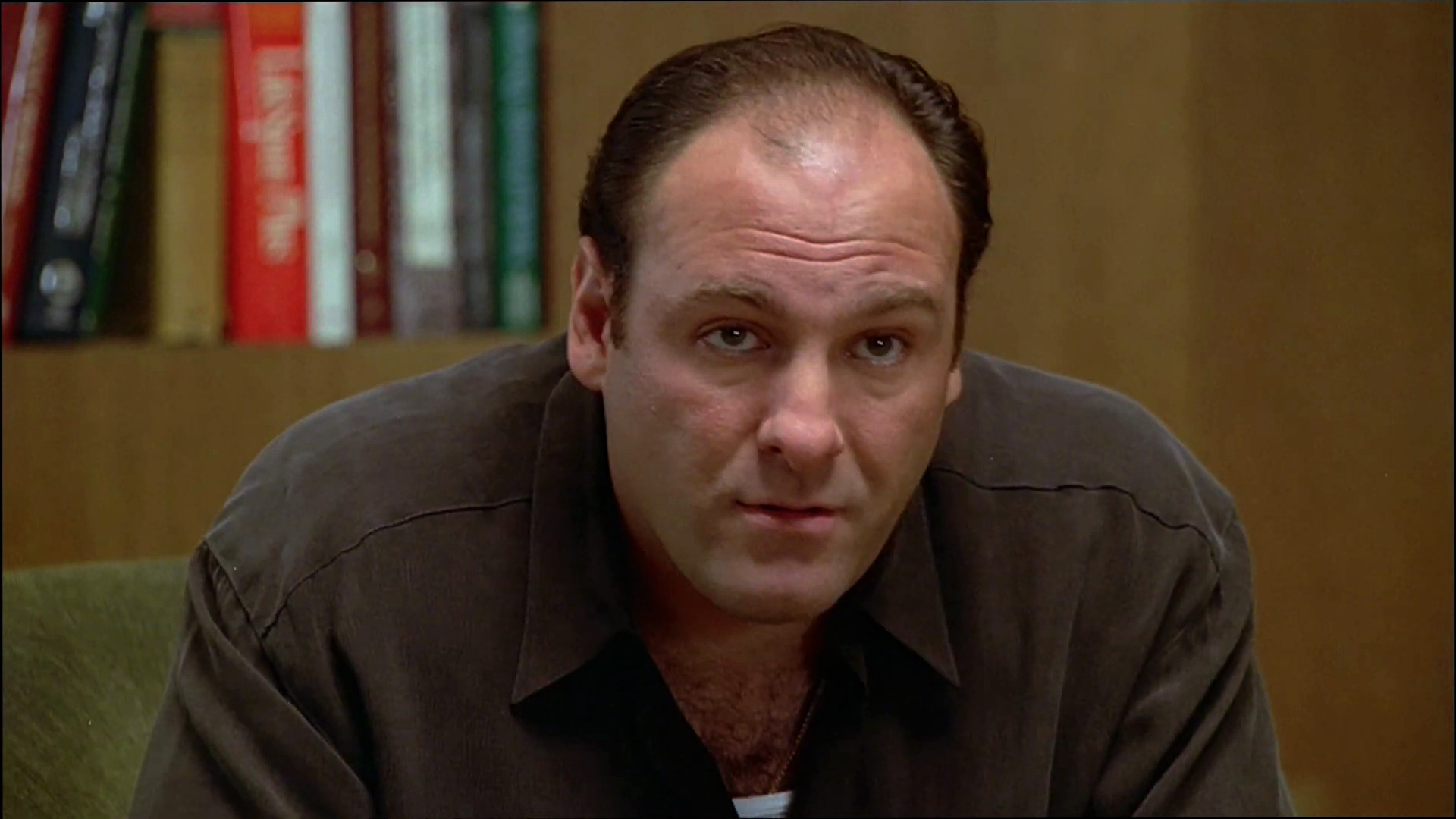
- Tony Soprano during a therapy session
- Episode no.: Season 1 Episode 7
- Directed by: Lorraine Senna Ferrara
- Written by: Robin Green; Mitchell Burgess
- Cinematography by: Alik Sakharov
- Production code: 107
- Original air date: February 21, 1999
- Running time: 51 minutes

Episode chronology
← Previous "Pax Soprana"	Next → "The Legend of Tennessee Moltisanti"
- The Sopranos season 1

"Down Neck" is the seventh episode of the HBO original series The Sopranos. It was written by Robin Green and Mitchell Burgess, and directed by Lorraine Senna Ferrara. It aired on February 21, 1999.

== Starring ==
- James Gandolfini as Tony Soprano
- Lorraine Bracco as Dr. Jennifer Melfi
- Edie Falco as Carmela Soprano
- Michael Imperioli as Christopher Moltisanti
- Dominic Chianese as Corrado Soprano, Jr.
- Vincent Pastore as Pussy Bonpensiero
- Steven Van Zandt as Silvio Dante
- Tony Sirico as Paulie Gualtieri *
- Robert Iler as Anthony Soprano, Jr.
- Jamie-Lynn Sigler as Meadow Soprano
- Nancy Marchand as Livia Soprano

* = credit only

=== Guest starring ===
- Joseph Siravo as Johnny Boy Soprano
- Laila Robbins as Young Livia Soprano
- Rocco Sisto as Young Junior Soprano
- David Beach as Dr. Peter Galani

==== Also guest starring ====
- Paul Albe as Contractor
- Shirl Bernheim as Pearl
- Madeline Blue as Janice
- Bobby Boriello as Young Tony
- Scott Owen Cumberbatch as Rideland Kid #2
- Anthony Fusco as Father Hagy
- Rob Grippa as Byron Barber
- Jason Hauser as Rideland Cop
- Michael B. Jordan as Rideland Kid
- Greg Perrelli as Jared
- Nick Raio as Wiseguy
- Tim Realbuto as Jimmy
- Steve Santosusso as Guy
- Tim Williams as Mr. Meskimmin

== Synopsis ==
At their Catholic school, A.J. and his friends steal sacramental wine and turn up drunk at gym class. Tony, who is shaking down a foreman at a construction site, is called to the school and sees the psychologist along with Carmela. They are told that A.J. may have attention deficit disorder. Tony scornfully rejects this diagnosis and says A.J. is behaving like a normal 13-year-old. Carmela supports his opinion and they both walk out of the psychologist's office. Further misbehavior by A.J. during a dinner with Livia results in him being grounded.

Tony contemplates talking to his son about the family business. He flashes back to his own childhood, around the time of the 1967 Newark riots, when he witnessed his father Johnny Boy and uncle Junior viciously beat a man named Rocco Alatore. During a session with Dr. Melfi, Tony implies that his parents were abusive. As A.J. begins his psychological testing, Carmela tells Tony that he may have to go into special education. An argument ensues between the couple over which parent is to blame for A.J.'s problems, causing Carmela to storm off.

As part of his punishment, A.J. visits Livia at the Green Grove retirement community. Having overheard his parents talking about Tony's therapy, A.J. innocently tells his grandmother, who assumes that Tony is discussing her with the psychiatrist. She later tries to pass this information to Uncle Junior, but Tony happens to walk in before she can do so. Later, while changing a flat tire, Tony attempts to bond with A.J., who–having seen police photographers at Jackie Aprile, Sr.'s funeral–asks whether he is in the Mafia. Tony says that he isn't like Jackie, whom he calls a "complicated man."

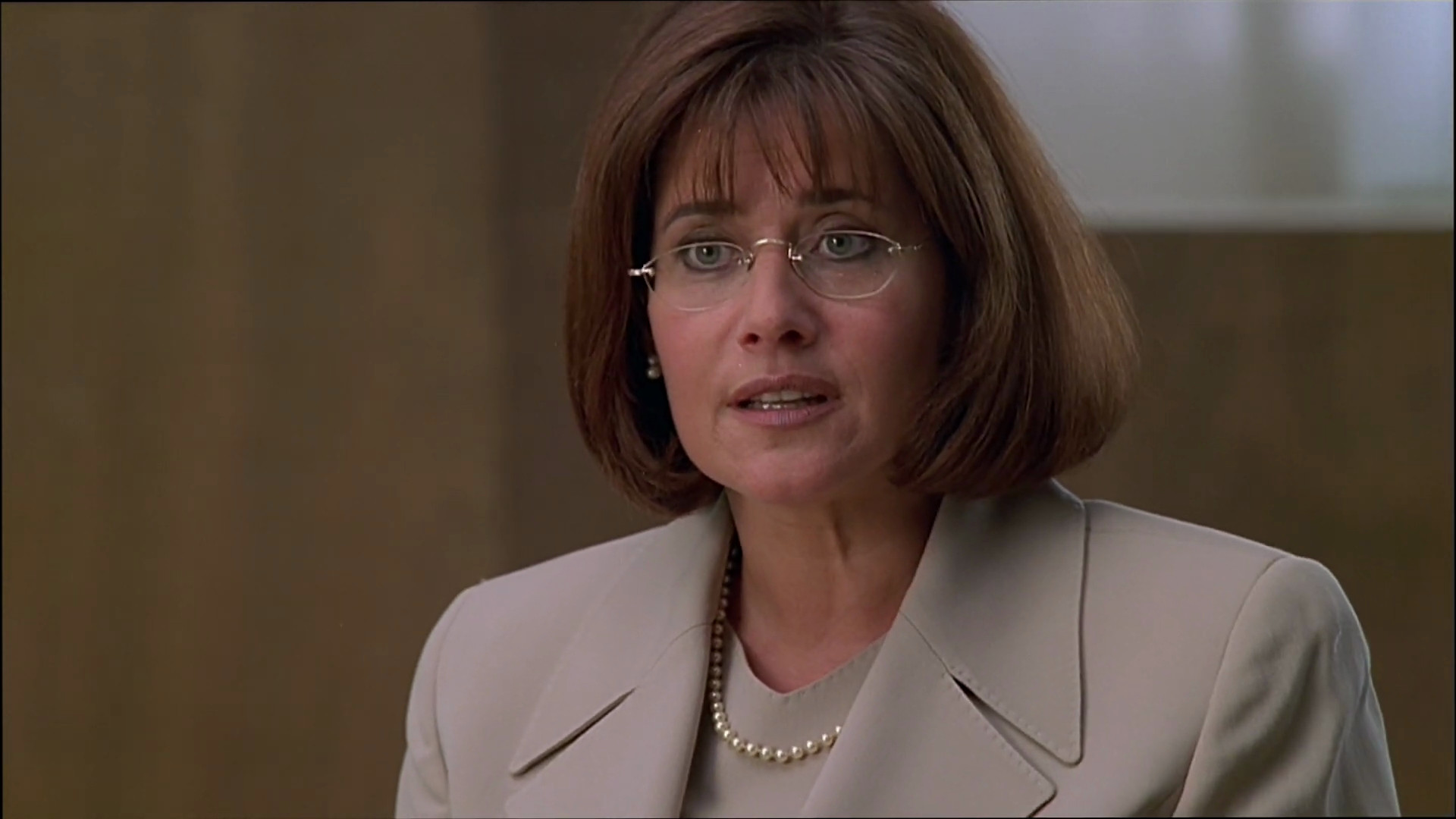
Dr. Melfi during the therapy session

During another session with Melfi, Tony expresses concern that he and A.J. inherited reckless tendencies from Johnny Boy. He recalls traumatic memories of Livia threatening to gouge out his eye with a fork, and of witnessing Johnny Boy's arrest at a mob-run fairground. Tony states that despite the arrest he is proud of being Johnny Boy's son, while acknowledging that A.J. doesn't have to be like him. Tony also recalls an argument between his parents when Rocco, the man Johnny Boy had beaten up, offered him a job in Reno, Nevada. Tony visits Livia at Green Grove to ask about Rocco, but she alludes to knowing about Tony's psychiatrist.

A.J.'s psychological testing confirms that he has borderline ADD. Learning from his experiences and therapy over the last few days, Tony resolves to spend more time with his son and prove that he doesn't have to be like his own father.

== First appearances ==
- Johnny Soprano: Tony's deceased father who appears in flashbacks to his childhood. He was the long-time capo of the original Soprano crew (which later became known as the Gualtieri crew) until his death from emphysema in 1986.
- Janice Soprano: Tony's older sister who appears as a child in flashbacks.
- Barbara Soprano: Tony's younger sister who appears as an infant in flashbacks.

== Title reference ==
- "Down Neck" refers to the Ironbound section of Newark, New Jersey where Tony grew up.

== Cultural references ==
- While being tested for ADD, A.J. mentions the animated series South Park, specifically the first episode, "Cartman Gets an Anal Probe."
- Dr. Melfi slightly misquotes George Santayana's words: "Those who cannot remember the past are condemned to repeat it."
- With Melfi, Tony mentions the murderers Leopold and Loeb.
- Johnny Boy inaccurately references Samuel Taylor Coleridge's Rime of the Ancient Mariner when he describes a certain something as "an albacore around my neck" (instead of an albatross).

== References to past episodes ==
- When Carmela mentions Meadow's suspicions about Tony's true occupation, flashbacks from "College" appear briefly.

== Music ==
- The song played on the television during Tony's flashback to 1967 was a live performance of "I've Been Lonely Too Long" by The Rascals on The Ed Sullivan Show. During the scene, Tony's mother implies her husband was arrested because he's Italian. "They're always picking on Italians," she says. The irony in the scene is, three of the four members of the Rascals—Dino Danelli, Felix Cavaliere, and Eddie Brigati—were Italian Americans.
- The song played while Tony takes his Prozac and remembers his childhood is "White Rabbit" by Jefferson Airplane. It is also played when he makes ice-cream sundaes with A.J. and into the end credits.
- The song played when young Tony misses the bus and sees Johnny and Junior beating up a man is "Don't Bring Me Down" by The Animals.
- The song played when young Tony plays catch with Junior while Janice leaves with Johnny for the carnival is "Carrie Anne" by The Hollies.
- The song played when young Tony hides in the trunk of Johnny's car and follows him and Janice to the carnival is "Mystic Eyes" by Them.
- The song played when young Tony sees Junior, Johnny, and friends arrested at the carnival is "The Blue Danube" by Johann Strauss II.

== Filming locations ==
Listed in order of first appearance:

- Long Island City, Queens
- Newark, New Jersey
- West Caldwell, New Jersey
- Satin Dolls in Lodi, New Jersey
- West Orange, New Jersey
- Below the Pulaski Skyway in Jersey City, New Jersey
- Staten Island

== Reception ==
Emily St. James of The A.V. Club retrospectively praised "Down Neck" as "an unusually focused episode. It rarely deviates from its central thesis about fathers and mothers and their sons." She considered the flashbacks to be "nicely constructed and handily paralleled with Tony's fears that his kids will find out what he does for a living." Alan Sepinwall praised Gandolfini's acting and also stated, in reference to the scene where AJ tells Livia of Tony's therapy sessions, that the episode's two plots "make a great comic combination because AJ is so oblivious [...] that he not only doesn't realize what he's telling Livia, but is invulnerable to her usual emotional manipulations. Once Livia decides that Tony goes to a psychiatrist to complain about her, she starts up the waterworks and loud self-pity, and AJ couldn't possibly be less interested in, or even aware of, this display. It's priceless."

== See also ==
- Host desecration, with regard to A.J.'s theft and misuse of the sacramental wine
- Michael B. Jordan, this future star appears here in one of his earliest roles playing one of the Rideland kids who chases young Tony Soprano.
- Tim Williams, this future TV pitchman for the Trivago hotel website also appears here in one of his earliest roles as Mr. Meskimmin
- Lorraine Senna Ferrara, who directed this episode, is the only woman to have ever directed one of the "Sopranos" 86 episodes.
