= Tim Williams (actor) =

American actor

- Born: August 16, 1966 (age 59); Houston, Texas, United States
- Occupation: Actor
- Years active: 1994–present
- Children: 2

Timothy Leigh Williams (born August 16, 1966) is an American actor who is best known for his appearances in advertisements for the hotel website Trivago and his roles on German television and in German film, including the German series Gute Zeiten, schlechte Zeiten in the 2010s. He also played in the movies Valkyrie (2008), Ninja Assassin (2009) and Labyrinth of Lies (2014) and performed a music album, Magnolia City, around 2018.

Williams went to Robert E. Lee High School in Houston, Texas, and graduated in 1985. He went on to study at the Lee Strasberg Theatre and Film Institute

== Personal life ==
Williams moved to Germany in 2001. He is twice-divorced and has two sons.

In April 2019, Williams was found asleep at the wheel of a car, with his foot on the brake in Houston traffic, after which he failed a field sobriety test. The next week, a court hearing on the matter in Harris County Criminal Court was postponed to an indeterminate date. The case was fully dismissed in February 2020.

== Partial filmography ==
- The Mouse (1996) – Frank "The Gator" Lux
- Grind (1997) – Scott
- Fast Food Fast Women (2000) – Kindergarten Teacher
- The Sopranos (1999) - Mr. Meskimmin ("Down Neck")
- In Search of an Impotent Man (2003) – David
- Beyond the Sea (2004) – Bodyguard
- Drawn in Blood (2006) – Eric
- Valkyrie (2008) – Doctor
- Ninja Assassin (2009) – Europol Cell Guard
- Beloved Berlin Wall (2009) – CIA-Officer
- Chicken with Plums (2011) – Le docteur américain
- A Coffee in Berlin (2012) – Barkeeper
- Trivago (2012) – Trivago Guy
- The Apparition (2012) – Office Executive
- The Forbidden Girl (2013) – Sheriff Reynolds
- Labyrinth of Lies (2014) – Major Parker
