= HomeAway =

American vacation rental marketplace

HomeAway.com, Inc.
- Type: Subsidiary
- Industry: Travel
- Founded: February 2005; 21 years ago
- Founders: Brian Sharples; Carl Shepherd
- Fate: acquired, rebranded to VRBO
- Headquarters: Austin, Texas, United States
- Key people: John Kim (President); Trent York (CFO); Jeff Hurst (CCO); Tina Weyand (CPO); John J. Ostlund (CTO); Steve Davis (CIO); Jeff Mosler (CSO)
- Services: Vacation rentals
- Revenue: $446.8 million (2014)
- Parent: Expedia Group

HomeAway was an American vacation rental marketplace. It operated through 50 websites in 23 languages through which it offered rentals of cabins, condos, castles, villas, barns, and farmhouses.

Founded in February 2005 and headquartered in Austin, Texas, the company became a publicly traded company in 2011. Expedia Group acquired HomeAway on December 15, 2015 for $3.9 billion in cash and stock. In 2020 HomeAway and VRBO websites were rebranded as single Vrbo website.

== History ==
HomeAway was founded in 2004 as CEH Holdings. The company acquired several websites and consolidated them into a single vacation marketplace, launching HomeAway.com in June 2006.

HomeAway raised $250 million in venture-capital which was funded by venture capital firms Austin Ventures, Institutional Venture Partners, Redpoint Ventures, Technology Crossover Ventures, and Trident Capital.

A federal lawsuit accuses Austin-based vacation rental company HomeAway Inc. of engaging in "bait and switch tactics" after it rolled out new service fees for customers booking vacation rentals.

Those fees "range from 4 percent to 10 percent of the total price of the vacation rental," according to the suit filed this week in US District Court in Austin. The suit claims the new fees are substantially increasing prices paid by consumers, dramatically changing the business model upon which HomeAway and its sister sites, such as Vrbo, were built.

=== Acquisitions ===
Acquisitions made by HomeAway have included:

Date	Acquisition	Location	Notes
2005	CyberRentals.com	US	
2005	GreatRentals.com	US	
2005	A1Vacations.com	US	
2005	Rent101.com	US	Relaunched shortly afterwards as TripHomes.com
2005	Holiday-Rentals.com	United Kingdom	
2005	FeWo-direkt.de	Germany	FeWo-direkt was established in 1997 and acquired by HomeAway in 2005.
2006	Vrbo	US	Vrbo, also known as 'Vacation Rentals by Owner' and previously styled as 'VRBO', was founded in 1995 as a service for short term rental listings. It was acquired by HomeAway in 2006.
2007	Abritel.fr	France	
2007	VacationRentals.com	US	
2007	OwnersDirect.co.uk	United Kingdom	
2009	Homelidays.com	France	
2010	BedandBreakfast.com	US	
2010	AlugueTemporada.com.br	Brazil	
2010	Instant Software	US	
2010	Escapia	US	
2011	RealHolidays.com.au	Australia	
2012	Toprural.com	Spain	
2013	Travelmob	Singapore	This social networking site for accommodation and room rentals was founded in Singapore in 2012. Receiving US$1 million in funding in 2012, by late 2013 travelmob had an iOS app, and a distribution agreement with Wego.com. In May 2015, travelmob transitioned its brand and products to HomeAway.
2013	Stayz Australia	Australia	Stayz, an Australia-based vacation rental service founded in 2001, was acquired by Fairfax Digital, a division of Fairfax Media, in 2005. Fairfax Digital later sold the company to HomeAway in 2013.
2013	Bookabach.co.nz	New Zealand	
2014	Glad to Have You, Inc.	US	
2015	Dwellable	US	Dwellable was a mobile app and website founded in 2012 in Seattle, which had over 300,000 vacation rental listings by 2014, and had raised $2 million in funding. Originally in private ownership, it was bought by HomeAway in 2015 for $18 million.

== Business model ==
Before HomeAway introduced its new optional performance-based business model in 2013, homeowners paid subscription fees which averaged out to be $442 annually, to list their own property or display their vacation rentals on the company's sites. To promote the vacation rentals, property owners and managers could purchase paid listings on one or more of the company's websites as a form of advertising to potential travelers. Paid listings appear in search results when travelers search for vacation rentals, based on their search criteria. The new performance-based model represented a second option for travelers wishing to list a home on HomeAway, who could still opt for the original annual subscription model.

In 2016, HomeAway introduced a controversial service fee to be paid by travelers booking through the HomeAway websites. The service fee currently ranges from six to twelve percent of the total amount for most reservations (excluding taxes and refundable fees), but can be above or below that rate depending on the reservation. Generally, the higher the reservation amount, the lower the percentage of service fee.

The company claims the service fee for travelers covers the cost of providing 24/7 customer support, enhanced site and mobile features, plus expanded marketing efforts to generate more exposure to global audiences. Along with the introduction of the new service fee, HomeAway instituted their Book with Confidence Guarantee for travelers who opt to book and pay directly through the HomeAway platform.

Also in 2016, the company eliminated its tiered subscription model, whereby owners and property managers would have to pay more for preferred placement within the search results. Now only a basic annual subscription model is offered as an alternative to the pay-per-booking option, in which owners must pay from five to ten percent of the quoted total rental fee as the cost for each booking.

HomeAway also introduced a Professional Referral Network of 40 partner companies. The network's members assist vacation rental owners in managing their listings, guest inquiries, and reservations, and include Evolve Vacation Rental Network, Southern California Vacation Rentals, and No Worries Vacation Rentals.

== Financing ==
HomeAway announced in November 2006 its $160 million in financing to fund global expansion initiatives, including the acquisition of Vrbo.com (Vacation Rentals by Owner). On November 11, 2008, HomeAway announced it had completed an additional $250 million equity capital raise. The investment was led by Technology Crossover Ventures (TCV) and with existing investors Austin Ventures, Institutional Venture Partners (IVP), and Redpoint Ventures. In 2010, The Wall Street Journal named HomeAway one of the top 10 venture funded companies.

== Legal status ==
HomeAway has had disputes over compliance with local lodging regulations, similar to competitor Airbnb. Both joined a lawsuit against the city of San Francisco, which was settled in May 2017 when the companies agreed to facilitate registration of all host listings with the city.

== See also ==
- Holiday cottage
