= Expedia Group =

American travel technology company

Expedia Group, Inc.

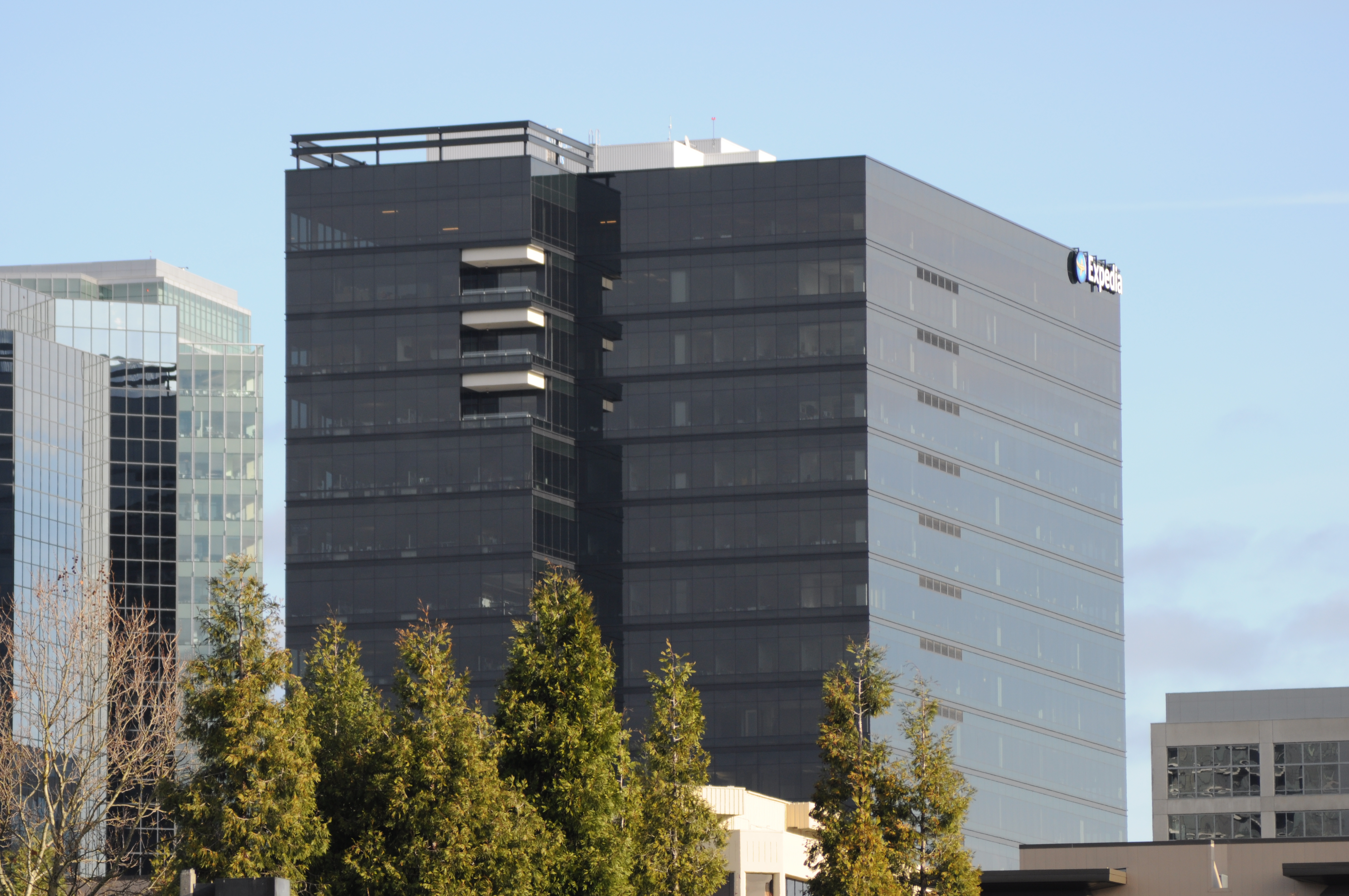
- Former headquarters of Expedia Group in Bellevue, Washington
- Formerly: Expedia, Inc.
- Type: Public
- Traded as: Nasdaq: EXPE; S&P 500 component
- ISIN: US65248E2037
- Industry: Travel technology
- Predecessor: Liberty Expedia Holdings
- Incorporated: Delaware
- Founded: October 22, 1996; 29 years ago
- Founder: Rich Barton
- Headquarters: Seattle, Washington, United States
- Key people: Barry Diller; (chairman and senior executive); Ariane Gorin; (vice chairman and CEO)
- Products: Expedia; Hotels.com; Vrbo; Travelocity; Hotwire.com; Orbitz; Ebookers; CheapTickets; CarRentals.com; Expedia Cruises; Wotif; Trivago; Expedia Group Media Solutions; Expedia Group Partner Solutions
- Revenue: ▲US$14.7 billion (2025)
- Net income: ▲US$1.29 billion (2025)
- Number of employees: 16,500 (2024)
- Parent: Microsoft (1996–1999)
- Website: expediagroup.com

Expedia Group, Inc. is an American travel technology company that owns and operates travel fare aggregators and travel metasearch engines, including Expedia, Hotels.com, Vrbo, Travelocity, Hotwire.com, Orbitz, Ebookers, CheapTickets, CarRentals.com, Expedia Cruises, Wotif, and Trivago. Over 3.5 million lodging facilities and flights on over 500 airlines are bookable on the company's websites. It has 16,500 employees, and its headquarters are located in Seattle, Washington.

The word "Expedia" is derived from a combination of "exploration" and "speed". The company is listed on Nasdaq under the ticker symbol EXPE.

== History ==
Founded as a division of Microsoft in October 1996, Expedia was spun off into a public company in 1999. IAC, known at the time as USA Networks Inc, acquired a controlling interest in the company in 2001 and acquired the remainder of the company in 2003. In August 2005, IAC spun off the company. In December 2011, Expedia, Inc. spun off TripAdvisor.

The company's headquarters moved from Bellevue, Washington to Seattle in 2019.

In February 2020, Expedia announced it was cutting 3,000 jobs, roughly 12% of the workforce, citing a "disappointing 2019". Diller, in his role as acting CEO, stated the company had become "sclerotic and bloated" and that employees were "all life and no work". The company announced another reduction in workforce in February 2024, aiming to reduce 1,500 employees, 208 of which are from the Seattle office.

In 2023, Expedia Group launched One Key, a unified loyalty program for Expedia, Hotels.com, and Vrbo. This allowed users to earn and use rewards across the three brands.

In 2024, Expedia Group launched Travel Shops, a platform that enables influencers and content creators to earn commissions by promoting hotels and travel accommodations.

Expedia Group's AI-powered travel tool launched in 2024 and allows Expedia customers to plan and manage trips.

=== Acquisition history ===
Date	Company	Business	Value (USD)	References
March 17, 2000	Travelscape	Travel Agency	$89,750,000	
March 17, 2001	Vacationspot	Hotel Booking Engine	$70,850,000	
March 11, 2002	Classic Custom Vacations (Note: Classic Custom Vacations was acquired from Global Vacation Group.)	Travel agency	$78,000,000	
July 11, 2002	Metropolitan Travel	Travel agency	—	
October 28, 2002	Newtrade Technologies	Reservation software	—	
April 5, 2004	Activity World	Travel and touring	—	
April 12, 2004	Egencia	Travel agency	—	
July 15, 2008	Venere.com	Hotel Booking Engine	€200,000,000	
October 18, 2010	Mobiata	Mobile App Developer	—	
July 21, 2011	Your Unlimited Adventures	Travel Management Company	$11,400,000	
April 27, 2012	VIA Travel	Travel Management Company	—	
March 12, 2013	trivago GmbH	Hotel Metasearch Engine	€477,000,000 in cash and stock	
May 17, 2013	Go Adventure Pro	Travel Agency	$11,600,000	
July 6, 2014	Wotif	Travel Agency	$657,000,000	
October 10, 2014	The Ocean Adventures	Travel Agency	$10,600,000	
January 14, 2015	Around the World Vacation Rentals	Travel Agency	$12,800,000	
January 23, 2015	Travelocity	Travel Agency	$280,000,000	
September 17, 2015	Orbitz	Travel Agency	$1.6 billion	
September 28, 2015	Mizuho Finances Corp	Travel Agency	$14,200,000	
November 4, 2015	HomeAway	Holiday Rental Service	$3.9 billion	
October 25, 2018	Pillow	Short-Term Rental Management	—	
October 25, 2018	ApartmentJet	Short-Term Rental Management	—	
August 22, 2019	CanadaStays	Holiday Rental Service	—	
December 10, 2025	Tiqets	Activities and experiences tickets	—	

=== Divestitures ===
Date	Acquirer	Target company	Value (USD)	References
April 10, 2005	Eviivo	RezOvation and Webervations	Unknown	
March 1, 2021	Najafi Companies	Classic Vacations	Unknown	
November 2, 2021	American Express Global Business Travel	Egencia	Unknown	

Expedia Cruises
- Formerly: CruiseShipCenters International
- Type: Subsidiary
- Industry: Travel industry, franchising
- Incorporated: Delaware
- Founded: 1987; 39 years ago
- Headquarters: Vancouver, British Columbia, Canada
- Key people: Matthew Eichhorst (president)
- Revenue: 14,700,000,000 United States dollar
- Net income: 1,294,000,000 United States dollar (2025)
- Number of employees: 16,000 (2025)
- Parent: Expedia Group
- Website: www.expediacruises.com

== Expedia Cruises ==
Expedia Cruises, formerly CruiseShipCenters International, is a travel agency franchise company established in 1987. In 2024, it had 260 locations in North America, and beyond cruises, booked "luxury and expedition travel, river cruises, land tours, safaris, all-inclusive resort properties and insurance." In 2021, it had 6,100 vacation consultants in the US and Canada.

=== History ===
CruiseShipCenters International was established as a travel agency franchise in Vancouver in 1987. In 2007, Expedia bought a "significant but non-controlling" interest in cruise vacation specialists CruiseShipCenters International, then based in Vancouver. At the time, CruiseShipCenters had 100 retail locations in Canada, and booked 20% of all cruises sold in the country. In 2007, it had projected annual revenues of $305 million, with 1,500 cruise consultants. Expedia announced it would expand the company into the United States as well. As of March 2013, Expedia Inc owned 100% of the company.

As of 2014, it retained its corporate office in Vancouver. With franchises in states such as Nevada by 2016, in February 2017, the Expedia division had 190 locations in North America. In 2018, Expedia CruiseShipCenters was expanding in Texas. In 2018, it had over $790 million in gross bookings. In September 2019, the company announced its 300th franchise agreement in North America. Matthew Eichhorst served as president. In 2020, the Expedia CruiseShipCenters rebranded to Expedia Cruises with the tag line Air, Land & Sea Vacations.

It had 290 franchise locations in 2021, and 6,100 vacation consultants in the US and Canada. In 2024, it had 260 locations in North America, and beyond cruises, booked "luxury and expedition travel, river cruises, land tours, safaris, all-inclusive resort properties and insurance." Eichhorst remained president in 2025.

== Criticism and legal issues ==
=== Delays in refunds of flights cancelled due to COVID-19 ===
In 2020, during the COVID-19 pandemic, customers complained regarding the process to get refunds for cancelled flights. Customers complained of excessively long call times and being unable to get through to a representative. This led to many lawsuits.

=== Involvement in Israeli settlements ===
On February 12, 2020, Expedia Group was included on a list of companies operating in West Bank settlements involved in activities that "raised particular human rights concerns" published by the United Nations Human Rights Council. The company was categorized under "the provision of services and utilities supporting the maintenance and existence of settlements".

=== False advertising and trademark violation incident (2016–2021) ===
In August 2016, Buckeye Tree Lodge and Sequoia Village Inn, LLC filed a class-action lawsuit in California accusing the company and its partners of violating trademark rights of numerous independent hotel and motel establishments by running advertising implying that consumers could book reservations for those hotels on Expedia even though Expedia had no relationship with those hotels, in violation of the Lanham Act, and also falsely noting that hotels with which the company had no relationship were "sold out". In April 2021, the lawsuit was settled and the company promised not to engage in false advertising.

=== Australian false advertising lawsuit ===
Note: (Note: Not to be confused with a separate 2021 lawsuit where Allianz Australia Limited Ltd and AWP Australia Pty Ltd were fined $1.04 million USD for misleading consumers using Expedia's websites. Expedia Group was never accused of wrongdoing in this lawsuit. "21-234MR Allianz Australia Insurance and AWP Australia ordered to pay penalties of $1.5 million for misleading sale of travel insurance on Expedia websites" (media release). Retrieved February 2, 2026.)

In a civil case spanning from August 2018 to April 2022, Trivago, a member of the Expedia Group, was found to have violated Australian Consumer Law through false advertising and was fined $32.91 million USD. Trivago advertised its online lodging search engine as capable of finding the cheapest deal and/or best rate, when in reality, it would prioritize listings based on their price-per-click. As a result, listings by larger conglomerates, including those by the Expedia Group and it's subsidies, were disproportionately represented on Trivago, even appearing more than once for each hotel. According to Trivago's data made public during the court case, the company presented a higher-priced room as a "highlighted choice" more than two-thirds of the time, even when a lower price was available.

=== South Carolina sales tax lawsuit ===
In January 2011, Travelscape, a subsidiary of Expedia Inc. based in the Las Vegas Valley, was ordered to pay $6.3 million in back sales taxes to South Carolina by the South Carolina Supreme Court. Travelscape argued that South Carolina's efforts to tax online retailers located out-of-state violate the Dormant Commerce Clause. In a unanimous ruling, the court determined that, while Travelscape does not have physical facilities in South Carolina, frequent sales trips made by its employees and the fact that the company furnished hotel rooms in the state establish its presence for tax purposes and is sufficient to be required to pay sales tax.
