= Hotwire.com =

American travel booking website

Hotwire
- Type: Subsidiary
- Founded: 2000; 26 years ago
- Founders: Karl Peterson; Eric Grosse; Gregg Brockway; Spencer Rascoff
- Headquarters: San Francisco, California, United States
- Products: Airline travel Car rental services Hotel reservation Vacation packages
- Revenue: US$ 35 million (2018)
- Number of employees: 300+
- Parent: Expedia Group
- Website: www.hotwire.com

Hotwire is an American travel website that offers airline tickets, hotel rooms, rental cars, and vacation packages. It operates by selling off unsold travel inventory at discounted prices. The company is headquartered in San Francisco, CA, Hotwire, Inc. is an operating company of the Expedia Group.

== History ==
Hotwire was launched in 2000, by Karl Peterson, Eric Grosse, Gregg Brockway, and Spencer Rascoff. Initial funding came by founding partner Texas Pacific Group (TPG), a leading private equity firm that Karl Peterson used to work for, that invested an initial $75 million into Hotwire. Hotwire first offered tickets from six major airlines, that also invested into Hotwire's launch: American, Northwest (now Delta), Continental (now United), America West (now American), United, and US Airways (now American). Prior to its formal launch, Hotwire was codenamed Purple Demon.

In September 2003, IAC/InterActiveCorp, which had acquired Expedia in 2001, announced its acquisition of Hotwire.com for $663 million. In 2004, an internet research firm estimated that through cross-advertising between Hotwire and Expedia, IAC was able to reach a total of an additional 1.5 million unique visitors to both websites monthly.

== Company affairs ==
=== Leadership ===
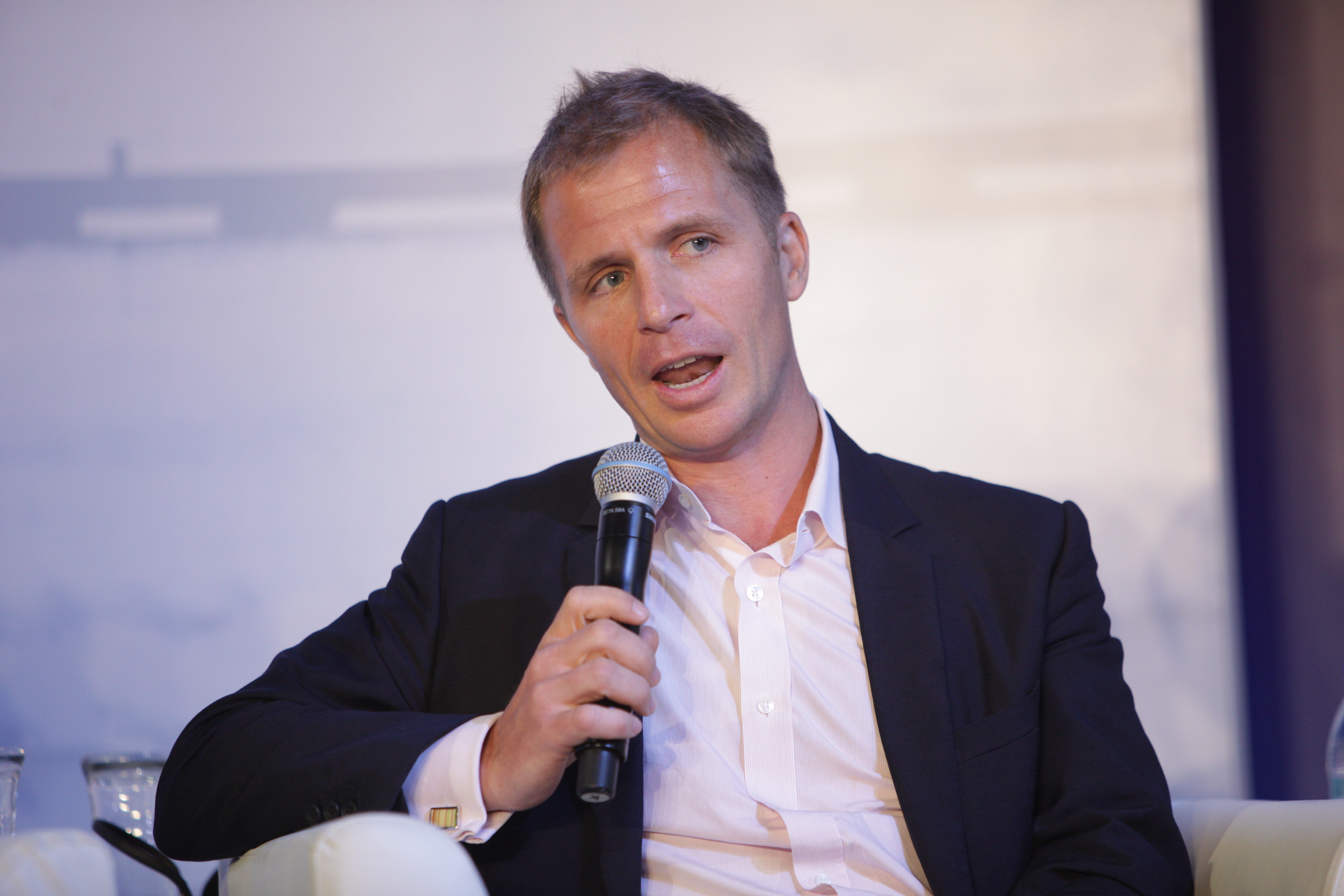
Henrik Kjellberg, 2014

Karl Peterson, one of Hotwire's four founding members, served as Hotwire's first CEO. In 2006, Hotwire was overseen by Founder and CFO (2004-2006) Eric Grosse. In January 2009, Eric Grosse became President of Expedia Worldwide and Clem Bason took over as President of the Hotwire Group.
