= Trivago =

German travel company

Trivago N.V.
- Formerly: Travel B.V.
- Type: Public subsidiary
- Traded as: Nasdaq: TRVG
- Industry: Travel, Hotel, Information technology, Marketing
- Founded: January 2005; 21 years ago in Düsseldorf, Germany
- Founders: Rolf Schrömgens; Stephan Stubner; Peter Vinnemeier; Malte Siewert
- Headquarters: Düsseldorf, Germany
- Areas served: 190 countries worldwide
- Key people: Johannes Thomas (CEO); Wolf Schmuhl (CFO); Jasmine Ezz (CMO); Andrej Lehnert (CPO)
- Products: Metasearch for hotel prices
- Revenue: Revenues for 2024 were €460.85 million
- Net income: −127,218,000 euro (2022)
- Number of employees: 651 (as of December 31, 2023)
- Parent: Expedia Group (60% as of December 2023)
- Subsidiaries: Base7booking; Rheinfabrik; TripHappy
- Website: www.trivago.com

Trivago N.V. is an international technology company owned by US-based Expedia Group that specializes in travel and lodging. Its main product is the Trivago online search engine and accommodation booking website that lists prices provided by hotels and other booking websites.

Trivago is headquartered in Düsseldorf, where its international operations are managed. Trivago is a subsidiary of Expedia Group and employs staff across product development, marketing, and data analytics functions, with its platform serving users globally.

== History ==
The company was founded in Düsseldorf, Germany, in January 2005. Seeing an opportunity in the hotel search space, the founding team developed Germany's first hotel search engine. Shortly after launch, Stephan Stubner resigned as Managing Director, but the three other founders (Rolf Schrömgens, Peter Vinnemeier and Malte Siewert) remained.

Initially, Trivago received €1 million from investors, including the Samwer brothers, Florian Heinemann, and Christian Vollmann. In 2007, Trivago received US$1.14 million in Series B funding from the British company HOWZAT media LLP. In December 2010, Trivago sold a quarter of the company for US$52.86 million to a US investment fund, Insight Venture Partners.

In December 2012, Expedia, an American travel company, announced that it would acquire a stake in Trivago for $632 million. The deal was completed in 2013.

In December 2014, Trivago acquired mobile app product and development company Rheinfabrik. After the acquisition, Rheinfabrik remains independent from Trivago in its work.

In 2015, Trivago reported more than US$500 million in revenue.

In March 2016, Trivago announced it had acquired a portion of Cloud-PMS company Base7booking.

On December 16, 2016, Trivago became publicly traded on the American NASDAQ exchange under the ticker symbol TRVG.

On November 5, 2019, CEO Rolf Schrömgens announced he will step down at the end of the year and be replaced by Chief Financial Officer Axel Hefer.

Due to the COVID-19 pandemic, Trivago had to cut many jobs. In March 2020, sales had fallen by 95% compared to the previous year.

== Business model ==
Trivago also offers free and fee-based versions of its Hotel Manager product, which hoteliers use to market their facilities on the Trivago site.

== Products and features ==
=== Trivago app ===
Trivago also offers free and fee-based versions of its Hotel Manager product, which hoteliers use to market their facilities on the Trivago site. As a hotel price comparison website, Trivago makes money from advertising partners primarily using a cost-per-click (CPC) business model. Booking platforms, hoteliers and other providers list rates and advertise on the Trivago site, paying for the clicks received from Trivago users.

=== Business Studio - Trivago for Business ===
Trivago Business Studio is a marketing platform dedicated to independent hoteliers. Hoteliers can improve their visibility in Trivago’s metasearch using Business Studio’s free, customizable analytical tools and promotional apps.

=== Rate Connect ===
Trivago’s Rate Connect is designed to help independent hoteliers increase direct bookings and lower distribution costs. The way to do that is by enabling hoteliers to promote their website directly on trivago, without the intermediary of an online travel agency.

=== Indices and rankings ===
==== Trivago Rating Index (tRI) ====
The tRI aggregates all ratings for destinations listed on Trivago and ranks them between 0 and 100. The index includes criteria such as location, price, food, internet, room and facilities, and is used to create annual Trivago rankings and awards such as the Reputation Ranking, Island Ranking, Ski Ranking, the Top Hotel Awards, and the Best Value Destinations (based on an algorithm combining the tRI with price).

==== Trivago Hotel Price Index (tHPI) ====
The Trivago Hotel Price Index (tHPI) displays the average overnight accommodation prices for the most popular cities worldwide. Prices are based on the cost of a standard double room, taken from over 2 million daily price inquiries over the past month.

== Marketing ==
Company flag

Trivago focuses on online marketing (SEM and display advertising), public relations and brand marketing (TV).

=== The "Trivago guy" ===
When the company aired its first U.S. TV advertisement in 2012, the ad's spokesman inspired a trending Twitter hashtag, #Trivagoguy, based on his unusual look. According to Rolling Stone, Trivago "wanted someone real, approachable and genuine" when it chose actor Tim Williams to star in the ad. The Trivago guy became an unexpected celebrity, with some people noting his unbuttoned shirt and creepy nature, while others found his scruffy appearance and deep voice "inexplicably sexy".

Trivago responded to the comments by launching a contest that invited people to give the Trivago guy a makeover. The Trivago guy inspired parodies, fan fiction and a large gay following.

Many commenters asked why Trivago chose not to have the actor wear a belt. According to the actor, that was an accident. "Unfortunately none of the belts fit the belt loops that I had on", Williams said. "I think that was probably the best break we could have gotten." Following the large response for the U.S. Trivago guy, the company decided to create French and Spanish Trivago guys. From 2016 until June 2017, the French actor Mehdi Nebbou was the German Trivago guy.

For Latin America (the whole Spanish-speaking region) Trivago's commercials are presented by Spanish actor Gonzalo Peña. In Brazil, the man shown on screen is the well-known actor and model Willian Mello.

In 2016, the company aired ads in India with Abhinav Kumar. Abhinav became popular and an internet sensation for his role in ubiquitous Trivago ads in India.

In 2024 former football manager Jürgen Klopp was named as the face of Trivago's new global marketing campaign.

=== The "Trivago girl" ===
In the United Kingdom, Trivago's advertisements are fronted by Australian actress and musician Gabrielle Miller. In Japan, Trivago is represented in their TV commercials by singer/songwriter Natalie Emmons, who uses the pseudonym "Strae" in the United States. In Malaysia, actress and TV host Dahlia Shazwan has starred in Trivago's advertisements.

== Legal issues ==
In August 2018, the Australian Competition & Consumer Commission (ACCC) instituted proceedings in the Federal Court of Australia against Trivago alleging that the company had made misleading representations on their Australian website and in their Australian television advertising. The ACCC case started in the Federal Court of Australia in September 2019.

In January 2020, the Federal Court of Australia found that Trivago engaged in Australia in conduct that was or was likely to be misleading or deceptive and that therefore contravened Australian Consumer Law. The ACCC argued Trivago promised Australian customers impartial, objective and transparent hotel price comparisons which would allow them to quickly and easily identify the cheapest offer available whereas the listing of an offer on Trivago's Australian website was subject to the payment of a fee (Cost Per Click) by advertisers and whereas Trivago did not show the cheapest offer. The ACCC claimed Trivago failed to properly disclose its operating model and used misleading "strike-through" price comparisons that compared a more expensive luxury room with a standard room.

In April 2022, the Federal Court of Australia fined Trivago AUD44.7 million (plus legal costs) for misleading Australian consumers whereas the ACCC had pushed for a fine of at least AUD90 million. Justice Moshinsky of the Federal Court of Australia noted Trivago's breaches of the law were "extremely serious".

== Leadership Structure Transformation ==
In 2023, Trivago announced a significant transformation in its leadership structure, welcoming a team of accomplished travel industry executives, who played significant roles in the company's worldwide growth.

Trivago founder, Rolf Schrömgens, returned to the company as an advisor and joined the supervisory board. Johannes Thomas assumed the role of CEO and Managing Director, succeeding Axel Hefer, who chose not to extend his contract. Jasmine Ezz rejoined as Chief Marketing Officer and Andrej Lehnert as Chief Product Officer.

== See also ==
- Webjet
