= Vrbo =

American vacation rental online marketplace

Vrbo – Vacation Rentals
- Company type: Subsidiary
- Website type: Vacation rental
- Owner: Expedia Group
- Commercial: Yes
- Launched: 1995; 31 years ago (as Vacation Rentals by Owner)
- Current status: Active

Vrbo (/ˈvɜːrboʊ/ VUR-boh) is an American online marketplace for vacation rentals and is owned by Expedia Group. Primarily based in Austin, Texas, VRBO was originally an abbreviation for Vacation Rentals by Owner, but since 2019 the company has been known as Vrbo.

== History ==
The VRBO website was created by David Clouse, a programmer, in 1995 in Aurora, Colorado with the goal of renting his Breckenridge Ski Resort condo. The website soon became popular with homeowners that wanted to list their properties for short term rental.

By 2006, VRBO had over 465,000 rental listings and was adding 100 new listings per day.

VRBO originally had a subscription business model in which payment of an annual fee allowed homeowners to list their properties on the website.

In 2006, VRBO was acquired by HomeAway.

On November 4, 2015, Expedia Group announced it would acquire HomeAway, including VRBO, for $3.9 billion. The transaction closed in the first quarter of 2016.

In March 2019, VRBO was re-branded Vrbo, including a new logo, capitalization, and pronunciation.

In May 2019, Expedia Group announced plans to streamline its vacation portfolio, naming Vrbo its primary vacation rental brand and retiring HomeAway.

In 2022, Expedia Group and Wieden+Kennedy created an advertisement for Vrbo called "A Place for Together", which aired during the Super Bowl pre-game and featured the song "Right Where I Belong" from the 1984 film The Muppets Take Manhattan. In the same year, Vrbo became a multi-year title sponsor of the Fiesta Bowl.

In 2023, As part of Expedia Group's platform consolidation, Vrbo's consumer front end migrated onto the Brand Expedia technology stack. Vrbo was also integrated into the One Key unified loyalty program across Expedia, Hotels.com and Vrbo in the United States in 2023, expanding to other countries in 2024.

== Criticism ==
=== Strict refund policies during the COVID-19 pandemic ===
During the COVID-19 pandemic, Airbnb and Tripadvisor forced property owners to offer full refunds to travelers that were impacted by the COVID-19 lockdowns. However, Vrbo did not mandate that hosts offer refunds to guests, leaving it up to guests and hosts to work out the details of any refunds. This prompted calls on Twitter to boycott Vrbo. Vrbo did, however, prohibit hosts from downplaying the COVID-19 pandemic in refund negotiations with guests. In 2024, Vrbo added a cancellation policy requiring hosts to issue refunds regardless of the property's cancellation rules during "unforeseen large scale travel disruptions". Vrbo decides whether a given situation qualifies for this policy, in which case it applies to all affected reservations.

=== Lack of backing of guarantee ===
The company has been accused of not complying with its "book with confidence" guarantee. In one case, a customer claims to have lost £6,000 after the property owner of a rental property in Ibiza booked on Vrbo "disappeared". The credit card issuer did not protect the customer as the payment was made to an "agent" rather than the host and Vrbo dismissed the claim citing that it is a matter between the host and the renter. Trustpilot reviews indicate that this user experience is common.

=== Hidden cameras in property bedrooms ===
In 2022 the company was the subject of several lawsuits after customers renting properties using the platform have found hidden cameras in private areas of properties, including in bedrooms. Police have also found images of guests undressed on the computers of such homeowners.

=== Non-compliance with rental laws ===
In March 2022, Vrbo was sued by the city of Los Angeles for not complying with its rental laws, including allowing hosts to use the platform without registering under the city's short-term rental ordinance. City Attorney Mike Feuer claimed that about 29% of bookings made in a recent 30-day period appeared to violate the city's rules.
