= Short-haul flight ban =

Proposed environmental policy

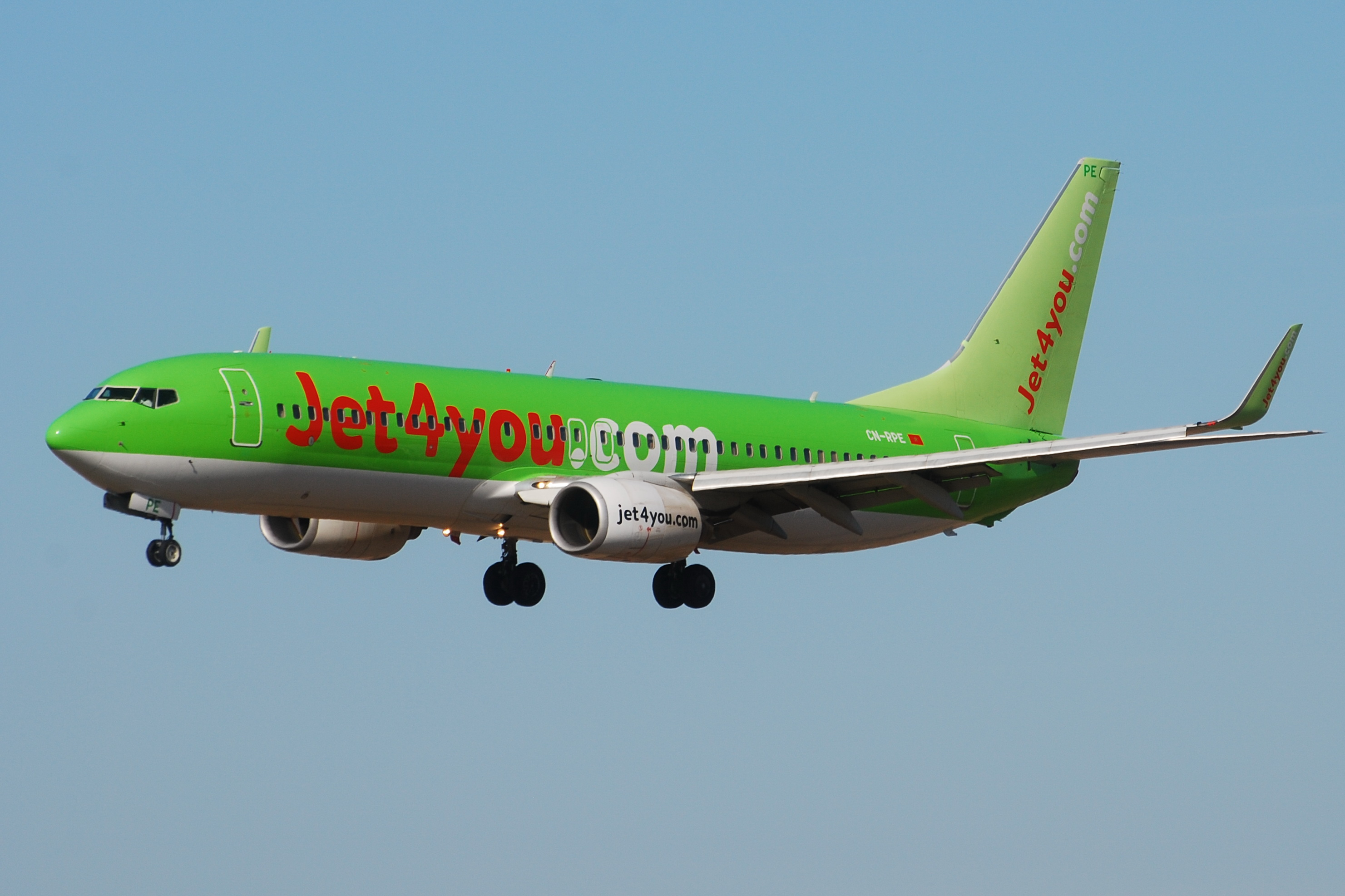
The Belgian region of Wallonia banned Jet4you from flying between Charleroi and Liège in 2006 for environmental reasons.

A short-haul flight ban is a prohibition imposed by governments on airlines to establish and maintain a flight connection over a certain distance, or by organisations or companies on their employees for business travel using existing flight connections over a certain distance, in order to mitigate the environmental impact of aviation (most notably to reduce anthropogenic greenhouse gas emissions which is the leading cause of climate change). In the 21st century, several governments, organisations and companies have imposed restrictions and even prohibitions on short-haul flights, stimulating or pressuring travellers to opt for more environmentally friendly means of transportation, especially trains.

A portion of air travelers in short-haul routes connect to other flights at their destination. A blanket ban would have a significant impact on these travelers, as inadequate rail connectivity between airports and main railway hubs of cities generally result in longer overall travel times and disruption to travellers overall.

== Definition ==
There is no consensus on what constitutes a 'short-haul flight'. In public discourse such as debates and surveys, the term is often not explicitly defined. The International Air Transport Association (IATA) defines a short-haul flight as "a flight with duration of 6 hours or fewer", and a long-haul flight takes longer than 6 hours. In practice, governments and organisations have set different standards, either according to the absolute distance between cities as the crow flies in hundreds of kilometres, or in terms of how many hours it would take a train to cover the same distance. As one example, the University of Groningen set limits according to both standards, namely prohibiting its personnel from flying distances shorter than 500 kilometres, or shorter than can be travelled by train in 6 hours. There was some confusion on how to calculate and reconcile both limits: as the crow flies, the distance between Groningen and Berlin is 465 km, but the road connection 577 km; moreover, the train travel time varies from 5.40 hours to 6.30 hours.

== Overview ==
=== Governments ===
Overview of short-haul flight bans: For everyone; For employees
Enacted by	Distance
Austria	3 hours train travel
France	2.5 hours train travel
Netherlands	150 kilometres (proposed)
Wallonia (Belgium)	100 kilometres
Greater London Authority	6 hours train travel
BBC Worldwide	3 hours train travel
Environment Agency	≈7 hours train travel
CP University Linz	8 hours train travel
Klarna Bank AB	All within Europe
Tilburg University	500 kilometres
Ghent University	6 hours train travel
University of Groningen	6 hours train travel OR 500 kilometres
University of Geneva	4 hours train travel
Eberswalde University for Sustainable Development	10 hours train travel OR 1000 kilometres
HTW Berlin	6 hours train travel
Flemish Government	6 hours land travel OR 500 kilometres
SFB 1287 department of University of Potsdam	12 hours train travel OR 1000 kilometres
Institut für Energietechnik of Rapperswil University	12 hours alt. travel OR 1000 kilometres
Wageningen University	6 hours train travel
Radboud University Nijmegen	7 hours train travel
Canton of Basel-Stadt	1000 kilometres

Governments generally impose short-haul flight bans on all citizens and businesses operating within their territory. Some exceptions for emergency situations are granted.

- Austria: As part of its COVID-19 crisis support programme for Austrian Airlines in June 2020, the conservative–green coalition government introduce a special tax of 30 euros on airline tickets for flights spanning less than 350 kilometres (an unprecedented environmental measure within the EU). The Lufthansa Group further agreed to drop domestic connections that could be travelled within three hours by train. As an example, as of November 2020, the train travel time between Vienna and Graz was still too long (3 hours and 1 minute) to replace flying (35 minutes, not counting security check and waiting times), but many other short-distance flights were replaced by train connections. Since Austrian Airlines was the only carrier to offer these short-haul connections at the time of the agreement, this constitutes a de facto flight ban, even though no law has been enacted to ban such flights for airlines in general.
- Finland: Although there is no such ban, its state carrier Finnair has stopped flying Helsinki-Turku and Helsinki-Tampere and now runs a bus service instead for connecting passengers.
- France: On 3 June 2019, French MPs proposed to prohibit airline connections covering distances that could be travelled within 2.5 hours by train. French Finance Minister Bruno Le Maire stated in April 2020 and repeated in May 2020 that negotiations between the government and Air France–KLM on such a 2.5 hour short-distance ban were underway. On 9 June 2020, as part of its COVID-19 crisis support programme for France's aviation sector, Le Maire confirmed that 2.5 hour short-distance flights would be prohibited, while Air France–KLM's domestic flights would be reduced by 40%.
- Netherlands: In June 2013, Dutch MP Liesbeth van Tongeren (GreenLeft, previously Greenpeace Netherlands director) proposed to prohibit domestic flights in the Netherlands with the argument that they are needlessly inefficient, polluting and expensive, but Environment Secretary Wilma Mansveld (Labour Party) said such a ban would violate EU regulations that allow airlines to fly domestically. In March 2019, the House of Representatives of the Netherlands voted to prohibit commercial flights between Amsterdam Airport Schiphol and Brussels Airport (Zaventem). This distance of about 150 kilometres was covered by five return flights a day, most of them feeder flights: passengers from Brussels go to Amsterdam to embark on a long-distance flight from there, or vice versa. However, Infrastructure Minister Cora van Nieuwenhuizen (VVD) stated that such a ban was contrary to the European Commission's free market regulations and was thus not implemented.
- Wallonia (Belgium): In 2006, Walloon Minister of Transport André Antoine prohibited airline Jet4you from making a stopover in Liège during a Charleroi–Casablanca flight, arguing that short-haul flights of fewer than 100 kilometres caused too much environmental damage. In December 2006, the European Commission confirmed that the ban did not violate any aviation agreements with Morocco, with Commissioner Jacques Barrot stating: 'The national authorities are allowed to take such measures, especially for environmental reasons.' Jet4you sued the Walloon Government, but in November 2008 the Court of First Instance in Namur confirmed the legality of the short-haul ban, rejecting Jet4you's damages claim and ordering the airline to pay 15,000 euros for court proceedings. Minister Antoine marked this as a victory and again urged the Federal Government of Belgium to introduce a countrywide prohibition on short-haul flights (which had been considered by the previous Federal Transport Minister, Renaat Landuyt).
- Sweden: There is no ban against short-haul flights, but several have disappeared due to lack of subsidy or competition from train and road travel. Several domestic air routes are subsidised by the government in order to have reasonable travel times between the capital and remote parts of the country. A principle has been set up when to subsidise air routes: only when no other way of travel, e.g. through an unsubsidised air route or any train route, allow four hours travel time between Stockholm Central station and any municipality centre. The idea is that same day business travel should be reasonably possible. Some air routes, and therefore airports, have been closed down due to this. Storuman Airport was closed because Vilhelmina Airport could be used for Storuman. Mora Airport was closed because train travel time went under 4 hours. More air routes have been unsubsidised, but remained on a commercial basis and municipal support, but closed during the period 2000–2020, such as from Stockholm to Borlänge, Jönköping, Karlstad, Linköping and Örebro. They have got competition from improved railways and roads or got Covid-problems. An air tax has also been introduced. Two commercially operated air routes have (as of 2023) competing train travel times below 3:30 and that is from Stockholm to Gothenburg and Växjö.

=== Organisations and businesses ===
Organisations, including government organisations and NGOs, as well as commercial companies, sometimes impose short-haul restrictions on their own employees for work-related travelling, usually recommending or ordering personnel to take the train instead. Some exceptions may be granted for emergencies or destinations that are difficult to reach by train. If an employee's flight does not comply to the rules set by their employer, the travel costs will not be reimbursed.

- Greater London Authority: On 12 March 2008, Mayor of London Ken Livingstone banned short-haul flights for all 20,000 employees of the Greater London Authority (alias City Hall), Transport for London and London Development Agency. A City Hall report published that day stated that all travel within the UK and most continental European cities should be undertaken by rail, unless such a journey would take longer than 6 hours. A 2010 Transport for London report noted: "As train travel is less carbon-intensive than travelling by airplane many organisations now implement a ban on all short-haul flights where an equivalent journey by train of less than six hours is available".
- BBC Worldwide (now BBC Studios): The British Broadcasting Corporation decided in October 2009 that all BBC Worldwide staff members were no longer allowed to fly domestically or on short-haul flights on the company's expenses, unless when travelling by train added more than three hours to their journeys. Additionally, they had to formally explain why a meeting could not be held using one of the BBC's five videoconferencing suites before they were cleared to book a long-haul flight. The measures were taken to reduce environmental impact and cut costs.
- Environment Agency: The UK government's Bristol-based Environment Agency banned its staff from making short-haul flights in June 2010, covering all of England and Wales and several destinations in continental Europe including Paris and Brussels, mandating them to travel by train instead; Edinburgh and Glasgow would still be allowed by airplane "in exceptional circumstances". The Agency had already reduced its business car mileage by 24% in 2006–2010 and wanted to set the right example in aviation, too, in part addressing public criticism over the Department of Energy and Climate Change's many avoidable domestic flights.
- Catholic Private University Linz: Since 2010, the KU Linz is reimbursing staff flights "only if the most convenient train connection exceeds a travel time of 8 hours and if, in addition, CO_{2} emissions have been compensated via atmosfair".
- Klarna Bank AB: After the flight shame movement emerged in Sweden in 2017, the bank Klarna decided to prohibits all its employees from flying within Europe and discourage long-haul flights.
- Tilburg University: The 'TiU employees business travel compensation' as adopted on 1 January 2018 states that, "due to sustainability considerations", trips to destinations abroad until 500 kilometres are "in principle" performed by public transport (meaning bus or train) or one's own mode of transport (mostly cars); beyond 500 kilometres, airplanes may be used. In case the rules are not obeyed, the TiU will not reimburse the travel costs. A February 2019 inquiry showed that, amongst the employees top 10 destinations within Europe in 2018, only one (London at no. #7) was within the 500 kilometre limit, apparently demonstrating the policy's success, although central oversight to compliance appeared to be lacking.
- Ghent University: In June 2018, Ghent University introduced a sustainable travel policy to cut down its personnel's 5,300 annual flights (causing almost 15% of its CO_{2} emissions), most of which had destinations within Europe. Going forward, business flights were forbidden to 'green cities', meaning reachable by bus or train within 6 hours, or "if the travel time by train is no longer than the travel time by plane (duration of the flight + 2 hours, being the standard duration of travel time to the airport + duration of check-in + duration of transfer)"). For flights to 'orange cities', which are reachable by train within 8 hours, staff would be recommended but not required to take the bus or train as an alternative. Exceptions to these rules due to unusual circumstances might be granted after a formal request. All future business flights' carbon emissions had to be offset as well.
- University of Groningen: In May 2019, the university announced that henceforth it would prohibit its personnel from flying distances shorter than 500 kilometres, or shorter than can be travelled by train in 6 hours. The ban sought to slash the approximately 5,500 annual flights taken by university staff to attend congresses and symposia abroad, causing 15 million kilograms of CO_{2} emissions in the previous 3 years.
- University of Geneva: In September 2019, it was announced that the approximately 4,000 annual flights taken by university staff to attend conferences and meetings would be drastically reduced in order to contribute to CO_{2} emission cuts. Amongst other measures, more video conferencing would replace real-life events, flights over distances travelable by train in 4 hours and business class flights within Europe and the MENA region would be prohibited, and CO_{2} emissions created by unavoidable airplane travel would be compensated.
- Eberswalde University for Sustainable Development: On 19 September 2019, Eberswalde became the first university in Germany to mandate its staff to avoid flying distances under 1000 kilometres, unless the train trip took longer than 10 hours, or permission was granted for exceptional circumstances. As a university focused on sustainability, it concluded it should take a leading role in more sustainable transport, including eliminating the annual short-haul flight CO_{2} emissions, which accounted for 10% of all of its emissions in 2018.
- HTW Berlin: In late September 2019, the Berlin-based Hochschule für Technik und Wirtschaft announced it would scrap all staff short-haul flights travelable by train in 6 hours from 1 January 2020. The institutions' annual aviation emissions reportedly amounted to 263 tonnes; half of its business flights covered fewer than 750 kilometres.
- Flemish Government: Since 1 October 2019, civil servants of the Flemish Government are no longer allowed to travel by airplane to destinations closer than 500 kilometres, or travelable by land within 6 hours. Exceptions were only permissible if "serious reasons" could be demonstrated.
- SFB 1287 of the University of Potsdam: The 1287 Limits of Variability in Language department of the University of Potsdam no longer reimburses business flights shorter than 1000 kilometres or 12 hours train travel since 1 January 2020.
- Institut für Energietechnik of the Hochschule für Technik Rapperswil: 88% of Institut für Energietechnik members voted in favour (with 6% abstentions) of introducing a short-haul flight ban, defined as 1000 kilometres or travelable by alternative means of transport within 12 hours, for personnel by the end of January 2020.
- Wageningen University and Research: The WUR board announced a new sustainable travel policy in February 2020, mandating its staff (which flew 10,000 times in 2017, causing 200 tons of CO_{2}) to travel by train for trips of 6 hours or less, with the train also being 'preferred' for trips taking 6 to 8 hours. Only "when there are 'exceptionally good reasons' and with the boss's approval", flying for shorter distances would be allowed; these reasons would be evaluated after a year.
- Radboud University Nijmegen: In March 2020, on the Radboud Green Office's recommendation, the board announced employees were no longer allowed to take business flights travelable by train in 7 hours, beginning in September 2020. It also planned to set up a partnership with an external travel agency to regulate its employees' travelling behaviour without violating their privacy, and invest in better video conferencing technology to make travel unnecessary. According to research by two HAN students, the plan would save Radboud University about 10% of all its CO_{2} emissions.
- Canton of Basel-Stadt: In June 2020, all government employees were prohibited from taking flights to destinations closer than 1000 kilometres to the city of Basel for environmental reasons.

== Public debate ==
=== European Union ===
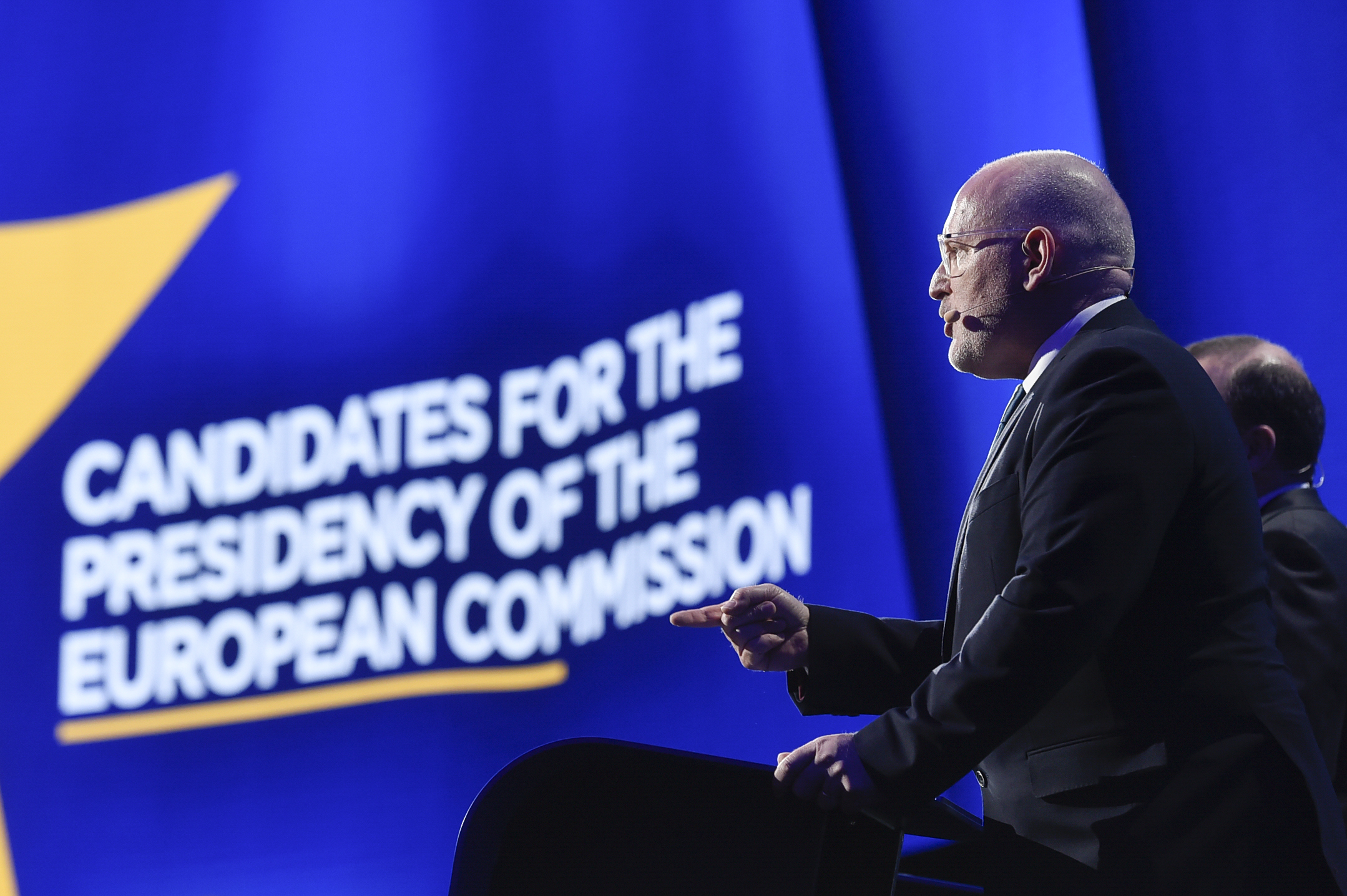
Frans Timmermans during the 2019 debate, when asked if short-haul flights should be banned, said: "Yes! But then we also need proper railways."

During a televised debate ahead of the 2019 European Parliament election in May 2019, European Commission presidential candidate Frans Timmermans proposed banning all short-haul flights in the European Union, with his opponent Manfred Weber partially agreeing that they should be reduced. Analysts pointed out that there was no agreed definition of the term 'short-haul flights', and that it could pose far-reaching implications for smaller regional airports that primarily serve domestic flights. In a September–October 2019 poll conducted by the European Investment Bank (EIB) amongst 28,088 EU citizens from the then 28 member states, 62% said they were in favour of banning 'short-haul flights'; the survey did not define the term.

=== Flanders ===
In August 2010, activist group Wiloo (Werkgroep rondom de Impact van de Luchthaven van Oostende op de Omgeving) demanded a short-haul flight ban and a domestic kerosene tax in Flanders, similar to the ones imposed in Wallonia in 2006 and the Netherlands in 2005 respectively, due to the rapid increase of pollutive domestic flights. A spokesperson said 700 flights (20%) in or out of Ostend were only 300 kilometres or less, adding that it was 12 times more expensive to transport passengers from Ostend to Brussels by airplane than by bus.

On 9 June 2020, during a lull in the COVID-19 pandemic in Belgium, Flemish Transport Minister Lydia Peeters participated in a short-haul flight of ASL Group from Brussels via Knokke to Antwerp, claiming she wanted to promote regional airports such as Antwerp, Ostend, Kortrijk during the aviation crisis, because she was "convinced that regional airports have a future in Flanders because of their economic importance." For several days, her action was fiercely criticised by citizens and environmental organisations, who argued regional airports were "not economically essential at all, but a source of damaging and perfectly avoidable CO_{2} emissions". Groen politician Imade Annouri remarked: "This is utterly sending the wrong signal. Several countries around us are abolishing short-haul flights and investing in high-speed rail instead. (...) Businessmen can perfectly take the train to European destinations." In light of the climate crisis, the Minister's decision was alleged to be "irresponsible to society". Peeters felt the need to apologise on three different occasions, first explaining she had accepted the proposal "to take part in a press flight because business flights are an essential pillar of our regional airports", eventually expressing regret and declaring she should not have embarked on the flight.

=== Germany ===
Timmermans' proposal triggered a fierce debate in Germany about banning short-haul flights (meaning shorter than 1,500 kilometres), with some politicians agreeing with him, others saying it went too far, and others supporting measures they deemed more appropriate. In mid-October 2019, the German Finance Ministry announced that it would not restrict short-distance flights, but would almost double the short-haul air passenger taxes instead, from 7.50 to 13.03 euros; medium-haul taxes would increase from 23.43 to 33.01 and long-haul taxes from 42.18 to 59.43 euros. Meanwhile, train tickets would become 10% cheaper.

By July 2019, most political parties in Germany, including the Left Party, the Social Democrats, the Green Party and the Christian Democrats, started to agree to move all governmental institutions remaining in Bonn (the former capital of West Germany) to Berlin (the official capital since German Reunification in 1990), because ministers and civil servants were flying between the two cities about 230,000 times a year, which was considered too impractical, expensive and environmentally damaging. The distance of 500 kilometres between Bonn and Berlin could only be travelled by train in 5.5 hours, so either the train connections required upgrading, or Bonn had to be abolished as the secondary capital.

=== Netherlands ===
Although in March 2019 almost all Dutch parliamentary parties agreed that train travel should replace short-distance aviation, there were also some practical problems to be solved before trains could become a viable alternative, such buying a combined train/plane ticket, the lack of a direct Thalys connection from Amsterdam Central and Paris-North to Brussels Airport (forcing passengers to switch trains in Brussels-South), and the fact that the Benelux train (which does directly connect Schiphol and Zaventem) takes over 2 hours (mostly due to the lack of a high-speed rail between Antwerp and Brussels). In November 2019, a Qatar Airways Boeing 777 cargo flight line from Doha to Mexico City with stopovers in Maastricht and Liège sparked controversy over "the most bizarre flight ever", as the distance between the latter two is only 38 kilometres and takes just 9 minutes, merely because a single Dutch customer requested their weekly package to be delivered in Maastricht rather than Liège. In response, two of the four Dutch government parties suggested prohibiting all flights shorter than 100 kilometres.

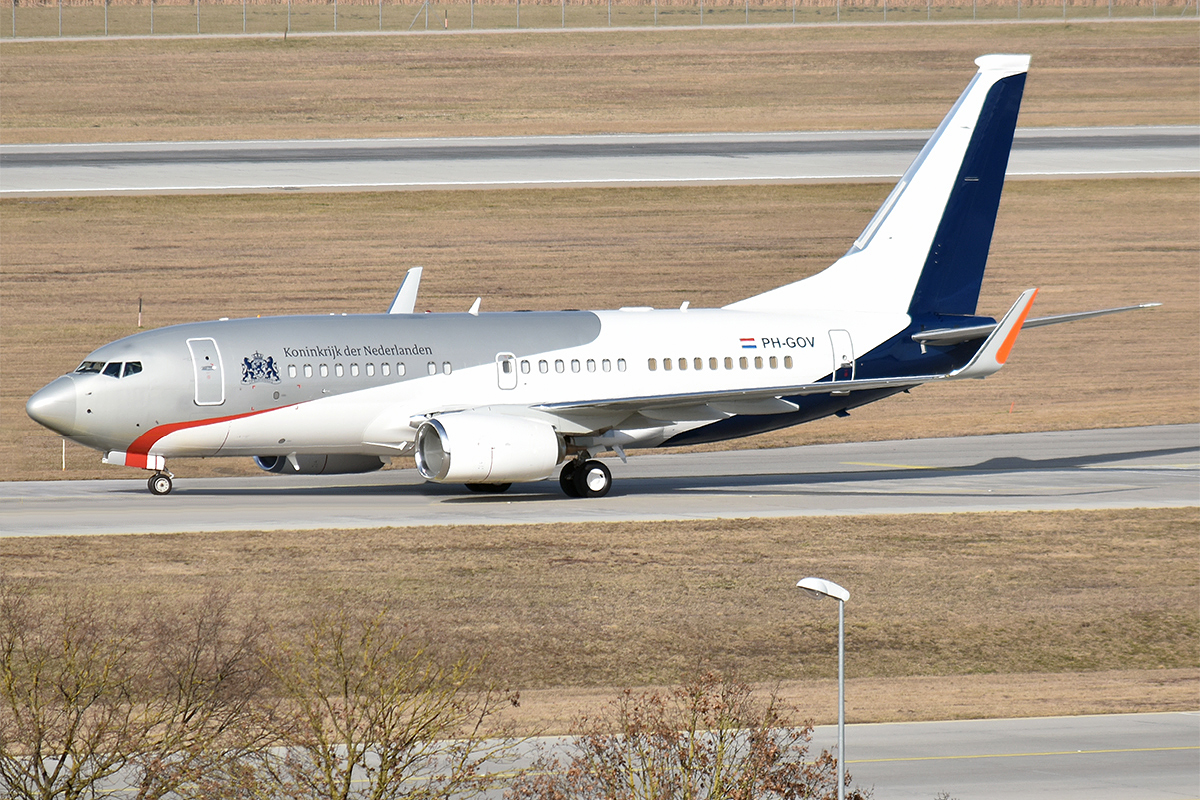
Dutch government aircraft PH-GOV at Munich Airport in 2020

In September–October 2022, research by RTL Nieuws revealed that Dutch ministers, state secretaries and the royal couple Willem-Alexander and Máxima were increasingly making short business flights on the Dutch government aircraft PH-GOV (a Boeing 737-700), private aircraft or commercial airliners (a 38% increase compared to 2019), even though this was contrary to the January 2022 coalition agreement to discourage short flights. Moreover, many aircraft flew empty back and forth in inefficient and environmentally polluting ways, and most distances could in principle have been covered perfectly well by train, or, if necessary, scheduled flights. This was evident in part because some ministers such as Dijkgraaf (education) and Harbers (infrastructure) travelled by official car or train from The Hague to Luxembourg or Paris in the first eight months of 2022, but Prime Minister Rutte and Minister Hoekstra (foreign affairs) together made 8 out of 12 flights to Luxembourg or Paris, mostly by government aircraft PH-GOV. Aviation experts were critical of the needlessly polluting and expensive travel behaviour of the ministers who were supposed to set a good example, and private aviation was also unhappy with the many short flights because of the high costs. In response to RTL's findings, coalition parties D66 and ChristenUnie reacted critically to the cabinet. and coalition party CDA also raised parliamentary questions about short and environmentally polluting empty flights, for instance between Amsterdam and Rotterdam, for a limited gain of time for a minister. Opposition party GroenLinks wanted to field a motion to force the cabinet and the king to travel by train for trips shorter than 700 kilometres. The Ministry of Infrastructure confirmed that the climate impact of aviation needed to be reduced, although ministers also needed to be able to do their jobs efficiently. The Interior Ministry also said that short flights were often unnecessary: "The time savings with flying are very limited, flying has more logistical challenges and is less flexible in terms of time than a train connection." However, according to the State Information Service and the Ministry of Foreign Affairs, alternative transport was not possible for all trips by commercial private jets, "because the government plane was not available and other means of transport did not fit agendas."

=== Universities ===
==== Movements ====
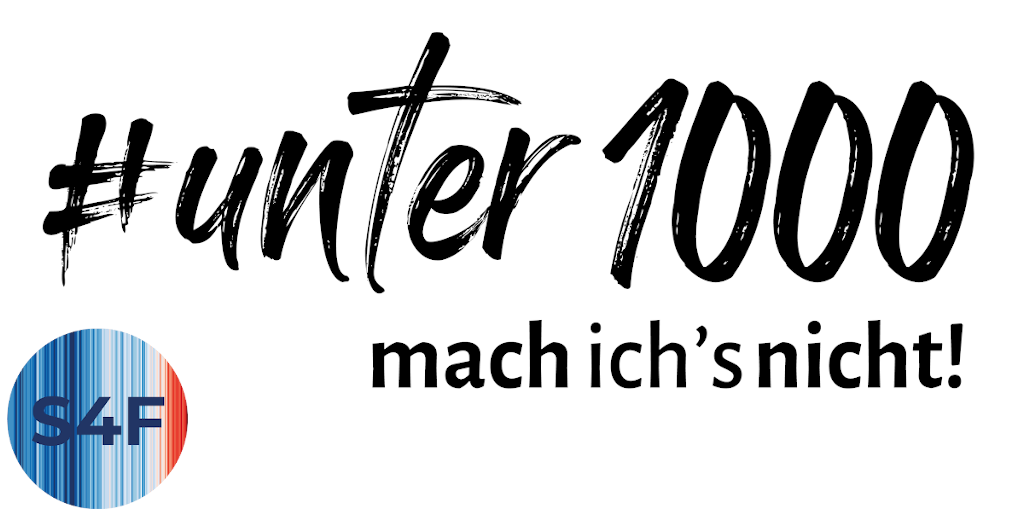
Scientists for Future campaign slogan: "#Under1000 I won't do it!"

In response to the 8 October 2018 IPCC report, more than 650 Danish academics from various disciplines published an open letter on 19 November 2018, calling on the managements of (Danish) universities to lead by example in combating climate change. Item number one on their five-point priority list was "drastically reducing flights and supporting climate-friendly alternatives". On 4 February 2019, 55 Dutch scientists, referring to the Danish initiative, published a similar "Climate Letter", including item no. #2: "Drastically reducing flights, with insightful targets, including through exercising critical consideration before travelling, using alternative modes of transport, and investing in climate-friendly alternatives and behavioural change to enable remote participation at academic consultations, conferences and exchanges." By 7 March 2019, all 14 Dutch universities (united in the VSNU) had expressed their support for the Climate Letter, which had been signed by almost 1,300 members of staff at that point. VSNU President Pieter Duisenberg stated: "The academic community can and must play a leading role in addressing climate change. This not only involves knowledge, but also whatever we as universities can do ourselves." Many Dutch universities were inspired by Ghent University's sustainable travel policy. In July 2019, Technische Universität Berlin professor Martina Schäfer similarly initiated a "Commitment to renounce short-haul (business) flights' (described as "travelable without flying in below 12 hours", or 1,000 kilometres), which was signed by over 1,700 German academics by 20 September 2019. The day before, Eberswalde University for Sustainable Development became the first Germany university to make the voluntary commitment to avoid flying distances shorter than 1000 kilometres or 10 hours train travel mandatory for all employees.

==== Discussions ====
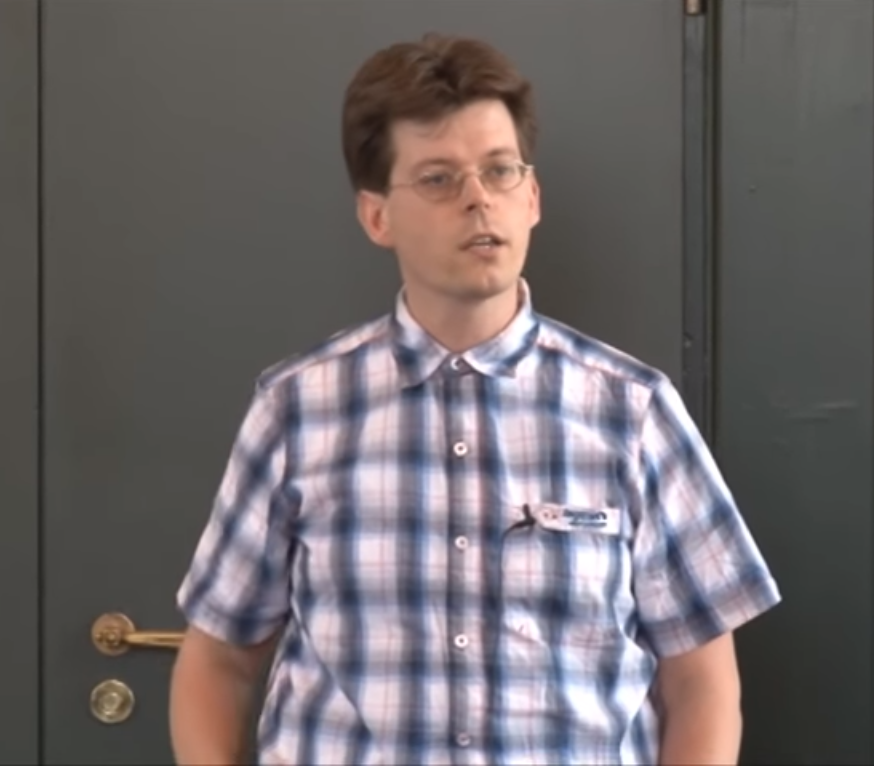
Casper Albers: "Some trips are necessary. But we should think: can we do conferences differently?"

Aside from advocating for more sustainable short-distance travel and arguing that the scientific community should lead by example, some academics have questioned the necessity and thereby justifications for many international flights in order to attend scientific conferences or researchers' meetings. Liesbeth Enneking (Erasmus University Rotterdam) stated that congresses have little added value, as researchers can already access their colleagues around the world through the online publication of their papers, and meeting peers in real life and speaking to them face to face is rarely important for their work. "Attending congresses is sometimes mostly just stimulating your ego, and a nice trip, (...) but for the planet's sake, this is a privilege that we can no longer afford on this scale", Enneking stated; she stopped flying in 2017. Cody Hochstenbach (University of Amsterdam) narrated how many short (for example, two days) international research meetings are:

great to catch up with each other and to discover a new city, but seldom they are actually productive. I was therefore enormously surprised that a Japanese professor had flown all the way to attend this meeting [in Le Havre]. Moreover, he had a heavy jet lag and regularly fell asleep during the sessions. It's obviously an expensive affair to have someone flown in across half the planet for just two days. I find it even more insane that universities facilitate and even encourage this behaviour.

Referring to arguments made by other academics, he added that this behaviour was a form of socioeconomic injustice towards many people with lower education and income who could never even afford such long flights. Individual scientists should take their responsibility and fulfil the burden of proof to demonstrate that their flights to such conferences are really useful, and cannot be replaced by trains. Climate lawyer Laura Burgers said: "Some scientific conferences abroad are no doubt useful, but we should be honest: often it's just fun to make a trip. Such advantages do not outweigh the environmental damage, however," recounting her experience of a conference where scientists discussed research that had already been published and thus "a waste of time and flight CO_{2} emissions".

While acknowledging that the current intensity should be reduced, other academics partially disagree, saying that, especially for young researchers, getting and staying in touch with their international colleagues in real life can really help to establish their network and advance their career, and make interactions easier and more complete than via video. Astrophysicist Ralph Wijers pointed out that his research projects, including trips he needed to make for them, were funded by several different organisations who required him to travel with the fewest expenses possible, often forcing him to take generally cheap plane tickets rather than relatively costly train tickets: 'We should address this on a larger scale: the more pollutive for the environment, the more expensive I think it should be.'

==== Alternate approaches ====
Some universities have consciously decided not to impose a formal ban on short-haul business flights, but instead encourage their employees to consider alternative modes of transportation, or to fully offset their carbon emissions, or to consider videoconferencing instead of flying to conferences and meetings, judging that such an alternate approach would still be sufficient to meet set environmental goals. For example, the University of Copenhagen's prorector stated in February 2020: "We're very keen to limit climate changes and we intend to reduce our total CO_{2} footprint even more. (...) The University's new travel policy does not impose a ban on air travelling, but sets out recommendations and suggestions for how to change travel habits. It is a matter of choice of transportation and providing alternatives to air travel. For example meetings and video conferences via digital platforms like Skype."

Leiden University has not introduced short-distance restrictions on flights, but set train travel as the norm for personnel journeys shorter than 6 hours or 500 kilometres since 2017. The university aimed to restrict thus-defined short-haul flights below 10% of all flights; since this was 5.7% in 2017 and further decreased to 4.5% in 2019, the policy was hailed as a success. In 2018, 90% of flight CO_{2} emissions were compensated by payments to, for example, the Fair Climate Fund.

In November 2019, Utrecht University chose not to impose a flight ban, but use various other measures, such as providing employees with information about alternatives, investing in better video conferencing facilities, a train zone map that calculates travel times, and compensation for train ticket purchases, to halve its number of flight kilometres by 2030. A flight carbon offset requirement was already imposed in 2018.

== See also ==
- Aviation taxation and subsidies
- EU aviation fuel taxation
- Flight shame
- Mobility transition
- Night flying restrictions (including night flight bans)
- Single European Sky
