= Jet fuel taxation in the European Union =

Taxation of fuel for aircraft in the European Union

Taxation of aviation fuel in the European Union is regulated by the Energy Taxation Directive (2003/96/EG) of 27 October 2003. This prohibits the taxation of commercial aviation fuel, except for commercial domestic flights or by bilateral agreement between member states. As of 2023, commercial aviation fuel is currently tax exempt under the legislation of all member states of the European Union. This tax exemption has been criticised on environmental grounds.

== Types of aviation fuel ==
Jet engines using kerosene fuel developed rapidly after 1950. Jet aircraft and almost all helicopters fly with a turbine drive; all turbines are operated with kerosene-based jet fuel. The majority of modern passenger and freight air traffic as well as military flights take place on jet aircraft.

Light aircraft such as private planes with typically 1 to 5 seats, as well as very small helicopters, usually fly with a piston engine. Almost all piston engines have carburettors, for which they rely on carburettor fuels, typically avgas (aviation gasoline).

Hot air balloons generate lift by burning propane or butane.

== Current status ==
Commercial aviation fuel taxation in the EU was banned in 2003 by the Energy Taxation Directive (2003/96/EC), except by bilateral agreement between member states. As of August 2019, no such agreements have been made. The Netherlands taxed commercial jet fuel from 2005-2011 on domestic flights only. The Netherlands abolished this tax on commercial domestic flights in 2012, due to complicated implementation and low revenue, but continued to tax aviation kerosene for pleasure and non-commercial business aviation. In all other European Union countries, commercial aviation fuel is tax-free. (Norway taxes kerosene however Norway is not a member of the European Union.)

== International agreements on aviation fuel tax ==
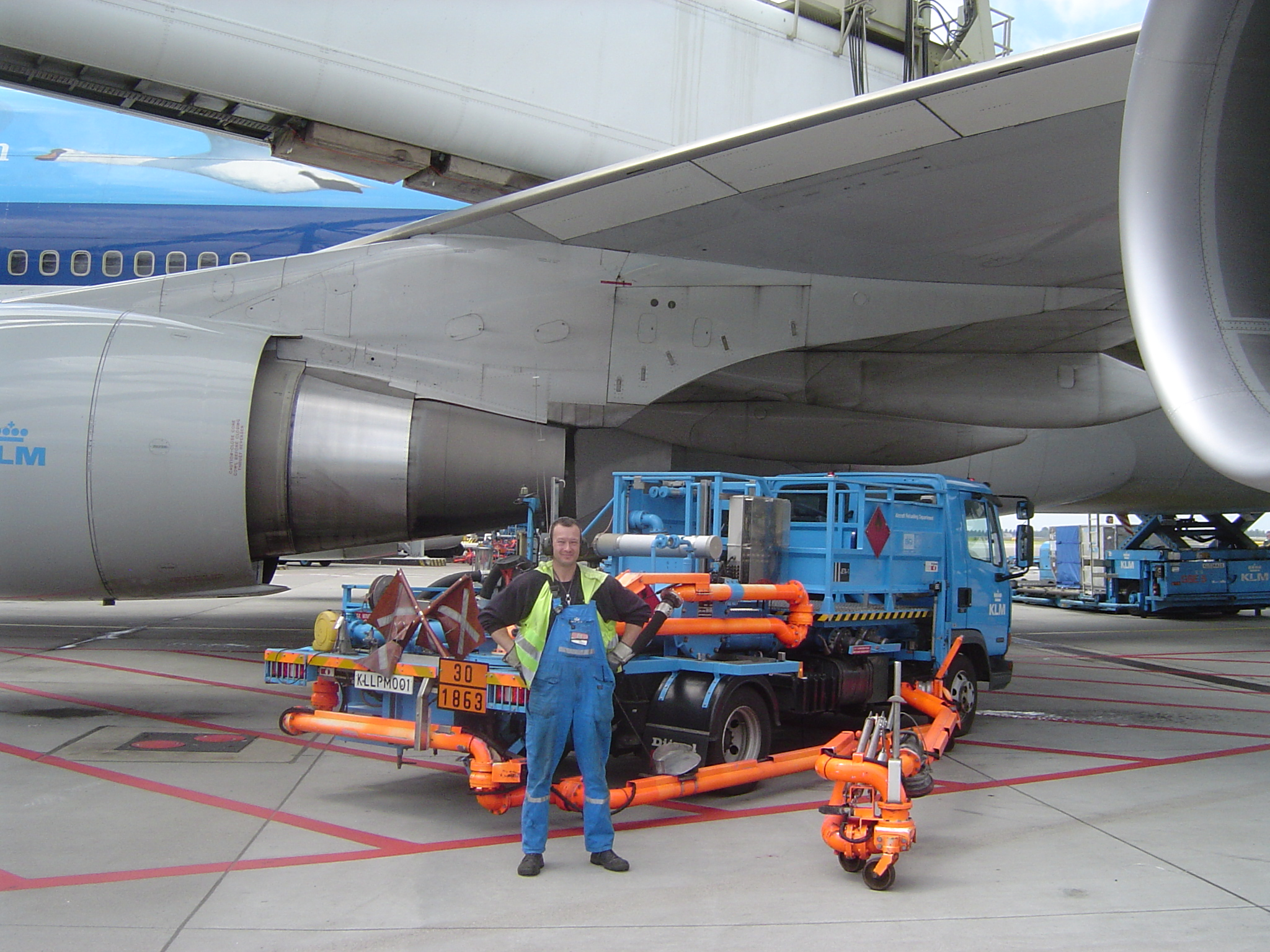
Tank truck at Schiphol Airport. Commercial aviation fuel is not taxed throughout the EU.

In Article 24 of the Chicago Convention on International Civil Aviation of 7 December 1944, on the basis of which the UN aviation organisation ICAO was founded, it was agreed that when flying from one contracting state to another, fuel that is already on board an aircraft may not be taxed by the state where the aircraft lands, nor by a state through whose airspace the aircraft has flown. This was intended prevent double taxation. However, there is no regulation in the Chicago Convention to prevent taxation when fuelling the aircraft before departure, for international or domestic flights. Although there are numerous bilateral agreements, so-called 'air services agreements', which make more extensive agreements, including often tax exemption when refuelling an aircraft that has come from another contracting state, these are independent from the Chicago Convention; moreover, some air services agreements do allow for the taxation of fuels. Although the ICAO has produced various policy documents suggesting that no taxes of any kind should be placed on aviation fuel, none of these are legally binding, and they are not found in the Chicago Convention itself.

The EU Energy Taxation Directive allows Member States to lift the tax exemption on domestic flights and on flights between Member States who conclude a bilateral agreement to that effect. The Directive stipulates in Article 14 (b) that 'Member States shall exempt from taxation (...) energy products supplied for use as fuel for the purpose of air navigation other than in private pleasure-flying', but also that 'Member States may limit the scope of this exemption to supplies of jet fuel (CN code 2710 19 21)'. In paragraph §3 of the directive's preamble, it adds as commentary: 'Existing international obligations and the maintaining of the competitive position of Community companies make it advisable to continue the exemptions of energy products supplied for air navigation and sea navigation, other than for private pleasure purposes, while it should be possible for Member States to limit these exemptions.'

== Criticism of tax exemptions ==
Environmental organisations have criticised the continuing tax exemption of aviation fuel in view of the negative environmental impact of aviation. The German Environment Agency emphasises that a lack of aviation kerosene taxation reduces incentives to airlines to use more fuel-efficient aircraft. For this reason, the governmental organisation classifies the missing kerosene tax as environmentally harmful subsidy, which in 2012 amounted to 7.083 billion euros in Germany. The Verkehrsclub Deutschland (Traffic Club Germany) also considers the lack of an aviation fuel tax as an effective subsidy. They state that an air passenger tax is a step in the right direction, but the taxation of aviation kerosene is still necessary. This view is shared by Greenpeace, who state that air traffic in Switzerland (not a member of the European Union) is subsidised relative to other forms of transport with CHF 1.7 billion annually because airlines do not pay fuel taxes.

Critics of the lack of kerosene taxation point not only to global warming due to carbon dioxide emissions, but also to other aviation emissions such as nitrogen oxide, particulate pollution, water vapor and contrail formation. Since the exhaust gases are emitted at high altitudes, the effects are serious. These other pollutants increase the damage caused by aviation in the atmosphere by a factor of two to four, as the German non-profit organisation Atmosfair has calculated.

The introduction of a state tax on turbine fuel is supported by environmental protection and transport associations and European railway companies either at national or European level with reference to an improved fair competition between modes of transportation and a consistent pricing of environmental externalities in the tariffs of air traffic.

A kerosene tax is also required for a more effective climate and energy policy of the European Union, as well as for financing the climate change adaptation of the least developed countries (LDC) by means of the Green Climate Fund.

A report by the House of Commons Library of the United Kingdom, published in 2019 before the United Kingdom had left the European Union, described the tax-exemption of jet fuel as an "indefensible anomaly".

== Efforts to introduce taxation ==
Proposals for a tax on commercial aviation fuel are sometimes known as a "kerosene tax", due to the kerosene-based jet fuel use in most commercial aviation, however jet aircraft can be used for private travel and avgas-fueled aircraft can be used commercially.

=== European Citizens' Initiative to end tax exemption on aviation fuel ===
A European Citizens' Initiative ran from 10 May 2019 to 10 May 2020 with the aim of ending the existing tax exemption on aviation fuel.

In order to be successful, a European Citizens' Initiative must receive a total of one million statements of support, of which a minimum number in at least seven countries. By the deadline, the initiative had received only 74,122 supporters of the required 1 million, with no member state passing its threshold (Finland came closest at 73.98%).

In a September–October 2019 poll conducted by the European Investment Bank (EIB) amongst 28,088 EU citizens from the then 28 member states, 72% said they would support a carbon tax on flights.

=== EU institutional efforts ===
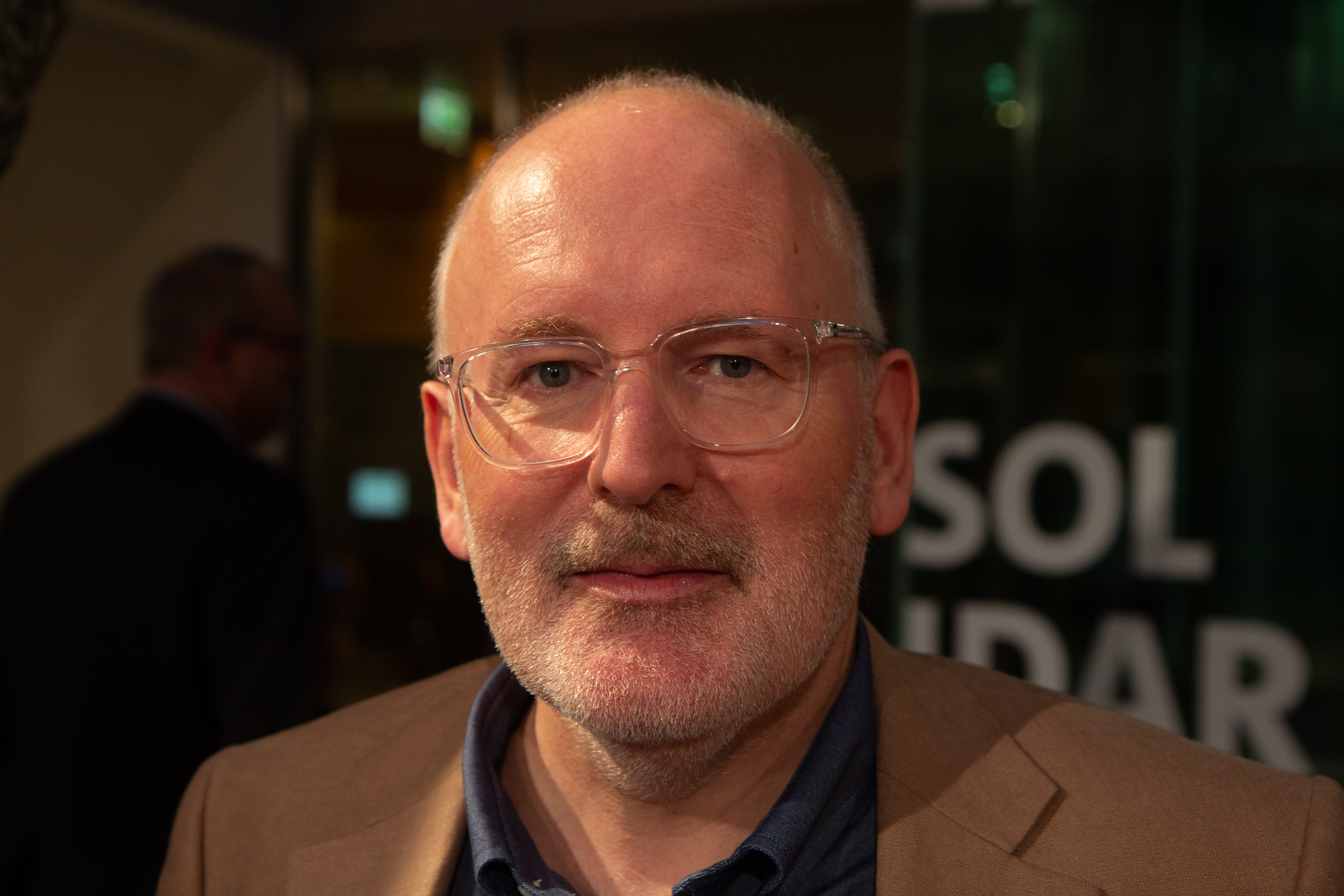
Frans Timmermans: 'I'm personally a proponent of a kerosene tax.'

The French government wanted to propose a Europe-wide flight tax at the meeting of EU transport ministers on 6 June 2019 in Luxembourg. This tax could be added to airline tickets and kerosene, or levied through changes in EU emissions trading. However, since taxation restricted to the EU area jeopardizes the competitiveness of the airlines concerned, because airlines from third countries could then enter the market all the more with cheap tickets, the proposal was not implemented and the topic would remain "on the agenda" for global discussion. In November 2019, the Finance Ministers of Belgium, Bulgaria, Denmark, France, Germany, Italy, Luxembourg, the Netherlands and Sweden presented a joint statement calling on the European Commission, more specifically European Commissioner for Climate Action Frans Timmermans, to introduce EU-wide taxes on aviation so as to charge the entire aviation industry more for its emissions and pollution, and put all member states on level pegging. Citing the fact that aviation causes around 2.5% of global CO_{2} emissions, the Ministers proposed both uniform air passenger taxes as well as kerosene taxes (both excise duties and VAT).

=== Austria ===
Aviation gasoline refueled in Austria (avgas 100LL, gasoline for piston engines) is subject to mineral oil tax and VAT. The same goes for different mineral oil tax rates are also automotive fuels, such as diesel and petrol. The mineral oil tax rate (per litre) is the highest on petrol, slightly lower on diesel (although its density, carbon and therefore energy content is significantly higher) and even much lower on heating oil EL (industrial gasoil), which is similar to diesel, much less, which is why heating oil is coloured red and its use in vehicles is strictly prohibited.

The vast majority of the refueled aviation fuel is kerosene (Jet A1, turbine fuel). No petroleum tax, VAT or any other energy tax is payable for refueling kerosene for international flights. After an increase of around 12% compared to the previous year, a good 1 billion litres = 1 million cubic metres of kerosene were refueled in Austria in 2018 – mostly for international flights. This corresponds to a consumption of around 120 litres of kerosene per person per year. At least 0.3 percent by mass of the sulfur that is harmful to nature and buildings may still be contained in kerosene (as of June 2011). In heating oil this is only 0.1%, in diesel only 0.001%.

If the state were to collect roughly 0.60 euros of mineral oil and value-added tax per litre of kerosene, as in the case of motor vehicle fuel, that would have made a good 600 million euros in tax revenue in 2018.

In Austria, as of July 2019, the introduction of a kerosene tax would have a clear majority in society, as a survey showed 73% of Austrians supported such a special tax. Amongst political parties, the Social Democratic Party of Austria (SPÖ), The Greens – The Green Alternative (GRÜNE) and NEOS – The New Austria and Liberal Forum are in favour of the introduction of a special tax on aviation fuel, the Freedom Party of Austria (FPÖ) is opposed to it, while the Austrian People's Party (ÖVP) is internally divided on the question.

=== Germany ===
According to the 2006 German Energy Tax Act (Energiesteuergesetz), jet fuel and aviation gasoline (avgas) for the commercial flights is free of energy taxation.

=== Netherlands ===
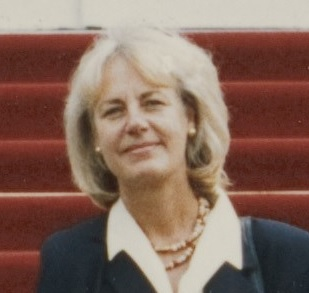
Margreeth de Boer: 'A tax on kerosene is an absolute must.'

Dutch Environment Minister Margreeth de Boer announced plans to introduce an excise duty on kerosene in April 1995: 'A tax on kerosene is an absolute must, flying should become much more expensive, especially within Europe,' she stated during a debate on sustainability in Amsterdam. In March 1998, Minister de Boer managed to convince all EU15 Member States that an excise on kerosene had to be introduced; however, its introduction was deemed to need to happen simultaneously around the world, a proposition heavily opposed by the United States. De Boer rejected the aviation industry's argument that airlines might try to refuel their aircraft outside the EU if an EU-wide kerosene tax was levied. In September 1998, environmental organisations Milieudefensie and Natuur & Milieu criticised the fact that, despite widespread support for it, neither a kerosene excise nor a value-added tax on tickets had yet been introduced; kerosene still only cost 0.35 Dutch guilders per litre, one of the lowest rates in Europe. The formation of a left-wing government in Germany in November 1998 made Finance Secretary Willem Vermeend optimistic about ending the kerosene tax exemption within the EU. But Natuur & Milieu was worried international treaties on aviation would preclude such taxation of kerosene, proposing to tax the emission of polluting gases instead; it calculated that levying 0.5 ECUs (1.1 guiders) per litre would make tickets about 15–20% more expensive. The Transport Ministry had calculated in 1995 that 12% VAT plus a 0.5 ECU excise would decrease the amount of flight kilometres travelled by 12%, leading especially tourists to forego flying and take the train instead.

The Netherlands introduced excise duties on kerosene in 2005 for all commercial domestic flights and all domestic and international pleasure-flying, including non-commercial business flights. In anticipation to its introduction, the Second Balkenende cabinet in September 2004 proposed to levy higher excise duties on kerosene for domestic flights; this was estimated to bring in an extra 14 million euros in revenue. In November 2005, MP Boris van der Ham proposed to levy kerosene excises on flights between the Netherlands and Germany, because both countries already had similar kerosene excises for domestic flights; Environment Secretary Pieter van Geel said he would consider it. On 20 December 2007, an open letter in Trouw written by MPs and backed by a parliamentary majority called on Finance Minister Wouter Bos and Finance Secretary Jan Kees de Jager to convince other European governments to also introduce more aviation taxes such as excises on kerosene to mitigate aviation's environmental impact; by that time, the Netherlands already had a domestic kerosene excise and planned to introduce a ticket tax on passengers on 1 July 2008.

In 2011, the Netherlands had an excise duty of 0.42 euro per litre kerosene for all domestic commercial flights and all domestic and international pleasure-flying, including non-commercial business flights. Pleasure-flying excises were increased to 0.43 euros per litre in 2012, 0.44 in 2013 and 0.48 in 2014, while commercial domestic excises were abolished in 2012. In March 2019, Finance Secretary Menno Snel stated that commercial domestic excises (which were levied from 2005 to 2011) were abolished in 2012 'because of complications in implementation and a low revenue yield'. He proposed to revise the 2003 Energy Taxation Directive to introduce an EU-wide uniform kerosene tax rather than 'a patchwork of bilateral regulations within the EU' (as stipulated in Article 14.2 of the Directive). Snel said that airlines from non-EU countries could be exempt from the tax as long as 'a humble threshold (de minimis) is introduced, because the number of intra-EU flights operated by third-country airlines is very limited.'

== See also ==
- Climate change in Europe
- Energy Taxation Directive
- Fuel taxes in the United States § Aviation fuel taxes
- Jet fuel
- Short-haul flight ban
- Single European Sky
- Tankering
