= Energy Taxation Directive =

Legal act of the European Union

Directive 2003/96/EC
- European Union directive
- Title: Council Directive 2003/96/EC of 27 October 2003, restructuring the Community framework for the taxation of energy products and electricity
- Made by: Council
- Made under: Treaty of Rome, especially Article 93
- Journal reference: L283, 31 October 2003, pp. 51–70

History
- Date made: 27 October 2003
- Entry into force: 31 October 2003
- Implementation date: 31 December 2003

The Energy Taxation Directive or ETD (2003/96/EC) is a European directive, which establishes the framework conditions of the European Union for the taxation of electricity, motor and aviation fuels and most heating fuels. The directive is part of European Union energy law; its core component is the setting of minimum tax rates for all Member States.

== Purpose and scope ==
The directive is intended to ensure the functionality of the EU internal energy market and to avoid distortions of competition through different tax systems. In addition, it should also contribute to a low-carbon, energy-efficient economy, that is, to exert a steering effect with the aim of protecting the environment and the climate.

For this purpose, it sets EU-wide minimum tax amounts for electricity and for fuels when they are used as motor fuel, aviation fuel or heating fuel. The minimum tax amounts vary according to the type of fuel (petrol, kerosene, gas oil, liquid and natural gas) and their use. When used as a heating fuel or when used in, for example, stationary engines, agriculture or construction machinery for public works, lower minimum amounts apply than when used as motor fuel. The Member States have extensive freedom in the design of taxes, the directive only requires that the indirect taxes reach the minimum amounts without value-added tax (VAT).

There are a number of exceptions to the directive:

- Lower taxes are permitted for commercial diesel.
- Tax exemptions and reductions may be granted for environmental and health reasons.
- Tax exemptions are possible for renewable energy sources and electricity for public transport.
- Tax reductions are possible for energy-intensive businesses.
- Some energy-intensive sectors, such as the metal industry, as well as substances that can be used for various purposes, for example for both heating and the production of chemical substances, are exempt from the directive.
- There are also a number of special and transitional rules for many Member States.

Member States are mandated to largely exempt commercial aviation and commercial shipping in the European Community's marine waters (referred to as 'air navigation and sea navigation'), but Member States are allowed to limit these exemptions (Preamble §23). For example, Member States are prevented from levying jet fuel tax, except on domestic flights and or with a bilateral agreement between member states (Article 14(1)(b) and (2)). No such agreements exist.

== Development ==
The directive replaced Directive 92/81/EEC and Directive 92/82/EEC – which only harmonised mineral oil taxes – after ten years of negotiations. European primary law, which is the legal basis for the directive, requires a unanimous decision of the European Council for tax law requirements. Unanimous decisions are also required for changes to the directive. When they were introduced in 2004, the tax rates in most countries were above the minimum tax amounts. In 2008, the Council asked the commission to come up with proposals on how to better align the Directive with the energy and climate targets of the European Union. The Commission concluded in 2011 that the directive was unsustainable and that it provided the wrong incentives. It proposed an amendment that would have set the minimum rates based on energy content and CO_{2} emissions. However, the proposal met with opposition from Luxembourg, Poland and, according to internal voices, Germany as well. In 2015 the Commission removed the proposal from its work programme.

According to the March 2020 feedback report of the European Federation for Transport and Environment, "the Energy Taxation Directive (ETD) has not been reviewed since 2003, and needs updating if the European Commission is serious about deploying its European Green Deal". It was set to be revised in 2021: a "roadmap" concerned with revising the directive, and an "inception impact assessment" were published in March 2020. The Commission says that its proposal

Would allow for a minimum taxation (excise duties) of electricity and enable EU countries to lower the tax rate down to zero where legally possible for energy intensive industries and households and for all industries in case of electricity from renewable sources. The proposal is currently being discussed by EU countries.

== See also ==
- Aviation taxation and subsidies § European Union
- Energy efficiency in Europe (study) – a study as part of the Odyssee Mure project
- Energy efficiency in Europe § National Energy Efficiency Action Plans
- Energy policy of the European Union
- EU Renewable Energy Directive 2009/28/EC
- EU Energy Efficiency Directive 2012
- European Union directive
- German National Action Plan on Energy Efficiency (abbreviated NAPE)
- Jet fuel taxation in the European Union
- List of European Union directives
