= Single European Sky =

European Commission air traffic project

The Single European Sky (SES) is a European Commission initiative that seeks to reform the European air traffic management system through a series of actions carried out in four different levels (institutional, operational, technological and control and supervision) with the aim of satisfying the needs of the European airspace in terms of capacity, safety, efficiency and environmental impact.

Single European Sky legislation was first enacted in two packages in 2004 and 2009. Those packages were replaced by Regulation (EU) 2018/1139 and Regulation (EU) 2024/2803, which established the European Union Aviation Safety Agency and implements the Single European Sky.

== Background ==
Military airspaces avoided by civilian aircraft (2009)

Air traffic management in the European Union is currently undertaken by member states, co-operating through EUROCONTROL, an intergovernmental organisation that includes most European countries.

European air spaces are some of the busiest in the world, and the current system of air traffic management allegedly suffers from several parameters, such as using national borders in the sky, and having large areas of airspace reserved for national military use when in fact they may not be needed. This has created, 'an outdated patchwork of airspace blocs and inefficient flight paths [which] impose significant financial and environmental costs on the sector.' For example, airplanes are often forced to 'circle the skies burning fuel when traffic controllers go on strike or are at capacity'. On average, planes fly 49 kilometres (30.4 miles) longer than strictly necessary.

=== Advantages ===
The Single European Sky is hoped to benefit airspace users by ensuring the safe and efficient utilisation of airspace and the air traffic management system within and beyond the EU.

- Airspace efficiency: Airspace management is planned to move away from the current domination by national borders to the use of 'functional airspace blocks' the boundaries of which will be designed to maximise the efficiency of the airspace.
- Safety, capacity, management efficiency: Within the airspace, air traffic management, while continuing to have safety as its primary objective, will also be driven by the requirements of the airspace user and the need to provide for increasing air traffic. The aim is to use air traffic management that is more closely based on desired flight patterns leading to greater safety (by preventing congestion), efficiency and capacity. The SES aims to triple capacity, cut 10% in flight times, and halve cancellations and delays.
- CO_{2} emissions and fuel cost cuts: According to the European Commission and the aviation industry itself, the SES could cut aviation's CO_{2} emissions by up to 10%, or 50 million tonnes. According to IATA, the SES would reduce airlines' annual fuel costs by 5.5 billion euros.
- Crisis management: The SES would be able to manage transport disruptions (such as the 2010 Icelandic volcano eruption), overcrowding (as was happening in 2019), as well as collapses in air travel demand (as happened due to the COVID-19 pandemic in 2020).
- Management cost reduction and job creation: The SES would require far fewer air traffic controllers, who have high salaries, thus substantially cutting personnel costs by about 50%; the number of control centres might be reduced from about 60 to about 20. Meanwhile, the development of Single European Sky ATM Research (SESAR) technology could create 328,000 jobs across Europe. By comparison, the 27 member states systems employed a little under 58,000 workers (including 16,900 air traffic controllers) in 2010.
- Innovative coordination: The SES would stimulate coordination on innovation in areas such as sustainability.
- Formation flying: The SES would enable formation flying, including Airbus' fello'fly project, which will save energy and benefit from an updraft.

=== Disadvantages ===
- ATC job losses: The SES would threaten the jobs of many air traffic controllers, because fewer would be needed to manage a pan-European sky.
- Security and sovereignty: Some EU member states, mostly larger ones, have expressed certain objections to relinquishing their current systems, primarily relating to national security and sovereignty concerns. For example, the SES could create problems concerning territorial sovereignty, such as over Gibraltar; Brexit seems to have removed this problem, however (see below).

== History ==
=== Origins (1999–2004) ===
After the Prodi Commission took office in September 1999, Transport Commissioner Loyola de Palacio launched efforts to structurally reform air traffic management across Europe, as she and many others had concluded that Eurocontrol was incapable of effectively carrying out its duties, particularly its decision-making and its failure to implement agreements. By the end of 1999, the European Commission had obtained the consent of all EU Transport Ministers for the 'creation of a single European sky', encompassing structural ATM integration and reform, and established a high level group of senior civil and military air traffic authorities representing the member states to prepare concrete policy proposals.

After the high level group had completed its report in late 2000, the Commission used its recommendations to develop legislative proposals for regulating the SES. In October 2001, the European Commission adopted proposals for a Single European Sky, to create a Union regulator for air traffic management within the countries forming the European Union, Norway and Switzerland. The European Union regulator was supposed to merge upper European airspaces, currently divided into national zones. It was proposed to organise this airspace uniformly, with air traffic control areas based on operational efficiency, instead of national borders. Also, there were plans to integrate civil and military air traffic management. The framework regulation that sketched the working methods of the SES, and specific regulations on air navigation, airspace and equipment, were adopted on 11 December 2003, and entered into force as Regulation (EC) No 550/2004 (Service Provision Regulation) on 20 April 2004.

There are discussions about enlarging the initiative to cover the Balkan and Mediterranean countries.

=== Gibraltar issue (2000–2020) ===
One report from the British Parliament, dated 2000, reported that Spain blocked the inclusion of Gibraltar Airport in the Single European Sky, meaning the whole package was suspended. Due to Brexit, formally completed on 31 January 2020, this stumbling block was removed.

=== SES-I (2004–2009) ===
The first SES legislation (SES-I) has been viewed as 'a real breakthrough', as is stimulated progress in harmonisation in air navigation service providers (ANSPs), the establishment of national supervisory authorities and EU competences over certification of these services. However, progress was slow in the next two years; the establishment of functional airspace blocks (FABs) was disorganised, little progress was made in improving cost efficiency, growing air traffic threatened capacity, and with tackling climate change emerging as a political priority, European aviation's emissions had to be mitigated. In response to strong demands from the industry, EU member states and other stakeholders, the Barroso Commission appointed a new high level group to develop a more detailed regulatory framework in November 2006. The group published its report in July 2007; it contained 10 recommendations, including making the EU the primary regulator of European aviation in order to set performance targets, safety requirements, introduce economic regulation of ATM services, incentives for ANSPs to achieve their objectives, and streamlining the implementation of FABs. Eurocontrol would provide the EU with technical support for regulations, safety regulation would be delegated to the European Aviation Safety Agency (EASA), and member states would be urged to hurry up with their commitments to implement the defragmentation of airspaces.

=== SES-II (2009–2012) ===
Map of functional airspace blocks in the Single European Sky NEFAB FAB DK-SE FAB UK-IRL Baltic FAB FABEC FAB CE SW FAB Danube FAB Blue Med

On 21 October 2009, a revision of the SES regulations called SES-II was adopted, which entered into force on 4 December 2009. Focus is here on four areas:

1. The existing Single Sky legislation is sharpened to deal with performance and environmental challenges.
2. The Single European Sky ATM Research (SESAR) programme is to provide the future technology.
3. The competence of the European Aviation Safety Agency (EASA) is to be extended to aerodromes, air traffic management and air navigation services.
4. The 'action plan for airport capacity, efficiency and safety' is to be implemented thus providing ground capacity.

The SES-II aimed to merge 36 national airspaces into 9 Functional Airspace Block (FABs) in order to provide better performance, ultimately 3 years later on 4 December 2012.

The air travel disruption after the 2010 Eyjafjallajökull eruption caused an acceleration to merge member states' air traffic control systems into the Single European Sky, and the immediate creation of a crisis co-ordination group to handle future transport disruptions. On 2 December 2010, France, Germany, Switzerland and the Benelux countries agreed to form the FABEC (Functional Airspace Block Europe Central), the third FAB to be created after the Dano-Swedish and Anglo-Irish block. The FABs were supposed to enter into effect by 2012, but delays were expected due to protests from ATC labour unions. The FAB CE, consisting of Austria, Slovenia, the Czech Republic, Slovakia, Hungary, Croatia and Bosnia-Herzegovina, was formed in 2011. By 26 October 2012, only the Anglo-Irish and Dano-Swedish FABs had been fully implemented, while the other 7 FABs were still in various stages of development; the deadline for the full realisation of the Single European Sky on 4 December 2012 was missed.

=== SES 2+ (2013–2018) ===
On 10 June 2013, the European Commission presented its plan "B" to speed up the implementation process of SES. The so-called SES 2+ is a package of measure which aim at challenging the current situation with state owned monopolies responsible for providing air navigation services. At the same time, transport workers' union ETF announced mobilising its members to protest against the suggested package. Negotiations on SES 2+ stalled in the Council in 2015.

In 2017, the European Court of Auditors determined that the functional airspace blocks have failed to defragment European airspace as they have not been fully implemented, with aircraft still being serviced by a different air navigation provider in each member state with different rules and requirements. This was due to a "lack of commitment on the part of the member states".

=== Amended SES 2+ (2019–present) ===
By 2019, nothing of the plan had yet been officially realised, adding an extra 6 billion euros in costs, and 11.6 million megatonnes of excess CO_{2} emissions for that year alone. In September 2019, 21 aviation organisations including Airlines for Europe (A4E), AIRE, ACI Europe, CANSO, ERA and IATA, signed an agreement in Brussels to urge the creation of an SES, and to work together with EU institutions and member states to achieve it. The Commission appointed 15 experts in the field to form a Wise Person's Group to assess the current situation and future needs.

After Brexit was formally completed on 31 January 2020 (eliminating UK objections and the Gibraltar issue), and the COVID-19 pandemic put the aviation sector into an existential crisis, the European Commission made a new proposal for a Single European Sky on 22 September 2020. It used the expert group's recommendations to amend the 2013 proposal's text, and introduced new measures; separately, it also drafted a proposal to amend the EASA Basic Regulation. Instead of relying on top-down regulation, which appeared not to have worked previously, the Commission stimulated voluntary alliances between so-called air traffic service providers. Airlines for Europe supported the proposal, but stressed the importance of 'enhanced governance structure' to ensure its success. Meanwhile, the FABEC and FAB CE zones, jointly accounting for 8.6 million flights (over 75% of all European air traffic) in 2019, agreed to formalise and intensify their cooperation in June 2020.

== Timeline ==
- Late 1999: European Commission appoints expert group to study the creation of a single European sky.
- November 2000: expert group publishes report with recommendations.
- 11 December 2003: SES-I (Regulation (EC) No 550/2004 alias Service Provision Regulation) adopted.
- 20 April 2004: SES-I in force.
- 21 October 2009: SES-II regulation adopted.
- 4 December 2009: SES-II regulation in force.
- June 2013: SES 2+ proposed.
- September 2020: Amended SES 2+ proposed.

== See also ==
- Air travel disruption after the 2010 Eyjafjallajökull eruption
- European Common Aviation Area
- Eurocontrol
- European Neighbourhood Policy
- EU aviation fuel taxation
- Short-haul flight ban
- Single European Sky ATM Research (SESAR)
- Energy Community
- Stability Pact for Southeastern Europe
- Transport in the European Union - Air transport
