= Functional airspace block =

Division of airspace in the European Union

Map of functional airspace blocks in a proposed Single European Sky NEFAB FAB DK-SE FAB UK-IRL Baltic FAB FABEC FAB CE SW FAB Danube FAB Blue Med

Functional airspace block (FAB) is defined in the SES-2 legislative package, as follows:

A FAB means an airspace block based on operational requirements and established regardless of State boundaries, where the provision of air navigation services and related functions are performance-driven and optimized with a view to introducing, in each functional airspace block, enhanced cooperation among air navigation service providers or, where appropriate, an integrated provider.

In the context of the Single European Sky (SES) regulations of the European Union and in particular in accordance with Article 8 of the Framework Regulation, the European Commission has issued a mandate to the Eurocontrol Agency for support in the establishment of Functional Airspace Blocks (FABs).

The SES-II regulation requires all EU members to be part of a FAB by 2012. All nine FABs have been declared, established and notified to the European Commission:

- UK-IRELAND FAB: United Kingdom, Ireland
- Danish-Swedish FAB: Denmark, Sweden
- BALTIC FAB: Poland, Lithuania
- BLUE MED: Italy, Malta, Greece, Cyprus, (Egypt, Tunisia, Albania, Jordan as observers)
- FABCE (FAB Central Europe): Czech Republic, Slovak Republic, Austria, Hungary, Croatia, Slovenia, Bosnia and Herzegovina
- FABEC (FAB Europe Central): France, Germany, Belgium, Netherlands, Luxembourg, and Switzerland
- DANUBE: Bulgaria, Romania
- NEFAB (North European FAB): Estonia, Finland, Latvia, Norway
- SW FAB (South-West FAB): Portugal (Lisbon FIR), Spain

In 2017 the European Court of Auditors determined that the functional airspace blocks have failed to defragment European airspace as they have not been fully implemented, with aircraft still being serviced by a different air navigation provider in each member state with different rules and requirements. This was due to a "lack of commitment on the part of the member states".
