= Tankering =

In aviation, tankering is the practice of loading more fuel than necessary for a trip, to take advantage of lower fuel prices at the airport of origin, or when fuel is in short supply at the destination airport. Tankering increases the weight of the aircraft and therefore total fuel consumption, however it can still reduce costs if the difference in fuel prices is great enough. Fuel prices can vary by over 50% within Europe, with price differences of 20% to 30% between major airports. Modern flight management systems can calculate the optimum amount of fuel to tanker for given origin and destination fuel prices.

In the ECAC area, full tankering is performed on approximately 15% of flights and partial tankering on a further 15% of flights. According to Eurocontrol, tankering on a typical 300-nautical-mile (560 km; 350 mi) flight can increase fuel consumption by approximately 2.21%, and tankering on a typical 600-nautical-mile (1,100 km; 690 mi) flight can increase fuel consumption by approximately 4.66%.

Tankering can be limited by a need to arrive with a lower amount of fuel, to avoid exceeding the maximum landing weight, or to avoid cold soaked fuel frost.

While tankering reduces costs for airlines, it increases fuel consumption and therefore carbon emissions. Taxing aviation fuel does not necessarily help reduce fuel consumption, because by increasing the price difference between jurisdictions which tax jet fuel and jurisdictions which do not, it can incentivise tankering.

== RefuelEU ==
The European RefuelEU legislation (in force since 1 January 2025) goal is to mandate the switch to sustainable aviation fuel (SAF) with the target ratios of 2% in 2025, 20% in 2035 and 70% in 2050. Use of SAF causes high additional cost (US Inflation Reduction Act in 2022 offered incentives as high as $1.75 per gallon). leading to tankering as a cost-avoidance mechanism. RefuelEU obliges aircraft to uplift fuel at all EU airports to prevent tankering.

== See also ==
- Jet fuel
- EU aviation fuel taxation
- Aviation taxation and subsidies

== Sources ==
- Cong, Wei; Zou, Lin; Lu, Jiaying; Shu, Xin; Li, Weiping (21 March 2026). "Do Sustainable Aviation Fuel Mandates Catalyze Decarbonization? Evidence From Europe's Pioneers". SSRN (preprint).
- Rausch, Sebastian; Straubinger, Anna (April 2026). "Turbulence Ahead: Economic Policies for Decarbonizing Aviation". SSRN.
