= Catholic Private University Linz =

Coordinates: 48°18′14″N 14°17′31″E

- Katholische Privat-Universität Linz
- Type: Private university
- Established: 1978; 48 years ago
- Location: Linz, Austria
- Website: http://ku-linz.at/

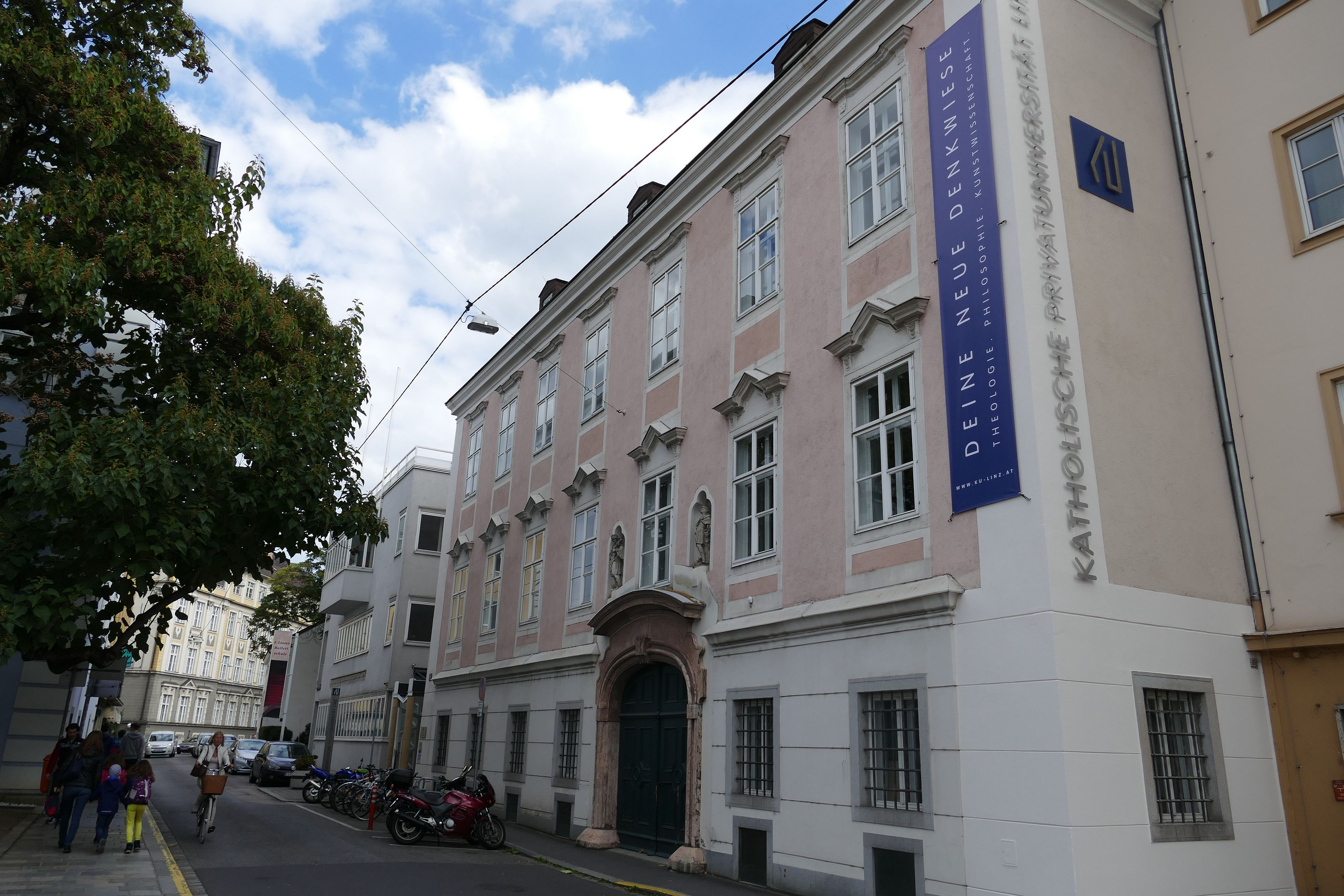
picture of Catholic Private University Linz

The Catholic Private University Linz is one of four universities in Linz, the capital of Upper Austria, with approximately 500 students enrolled. Its roots go back to 1672 and it is a Papal faculty since 1978. It is an accredited private university but its tuition fees currently (as of December 2004) match those of Austria's public universities.

== History ==
Historically, the Catholic Private University of Linz is the oldest of Linz's "Higher Schools." Theology has been practiced here since 1672. In 1971, the former Philosophical-Theological Seminary of Linz was renamed the "Philosophical-Theological University of the Diocese of Linz," and in 1978, the Congregation for Catholic Education initially granted it the status of a Theological Faculty on an experimental basis, and definitively in 1988. As the "Catholic Theological University of Linz / Theological Faculty" (KTHL), it is thus authorized to award academic degrees, which are also recognized under Austrian law based on the Austrian Concordat of 1933. The Federal Ministry of Education and the Arts confirmed this legal status in letters dated May 22, 1979, and September 18, 1979.

In 2000, the Catholic Theological University of Linz became the first private university in Austria to be accredited. The faculty council had already decided in advance, at its extraordinary meeting on October 27, 1999, to change the name to "Catholic Theological Private University of Linz" (KTU Linz) after accreditation.

On the occasion of the 10th anniversary of Franz Jägerstätter 's beatification, the Franz and Franziska Jägerstätter Institute was founded at the university on October 25, 2017. The institute is intended to study the biographies of Franz and Franziska Jägerstätter in greater depth, and will also focus on researching previously unknown witnesses of the resistance, peace work, and the theological and ethical discussion of civil courage and decisions of conscience.
