= Atmosfair =

German non-profit organization

- Formation: 2005
- Type: Independent German non-profit (gGmbH)
- Purpose: Climate compensation
- Headquarters: Bonn
- Services: Carbon offsetting
- Budget: €7.1 Million
- Staff: 31
- Website: www.atmosfair.de/en

Atmosfair is an independent German non-profit organization which offers offsets for greenhouse gases emitted by aircraft, cruise ships, long-distance coaches, and events. The organization, founded in 2005, develops and finances small-scale energy efficiency and renewable energy projects in developing countries, which lead to reduced carbon emissions. Atmosfair has repeatedly won acclaim for operating with a high degree of transparency and accountability, as well as efficient use of funds.

Its sole shareholder, the Stiftung Zukunftsfähigkeit (Foundation for Sustainability), was born from a joint research project by the Federal Ministry of the Environment and the organization Germanwatch. Atmosfair's acting patrons are Klaus Töpfer, Mojib Latif and Hartmut Graßl. Furthermore, the organization is a signatory of the Initiative for a transparent civil society (Initiative transparente Zivilgesellschaft).

Atmosfair is registered in Bonn and is run from its office in Berlin.

== Method ==
Atmosfair has developed an emission calculator that calculates the different greenhouse gases emitted when travelling and translates them into a corresponding amount of carbon-dioxide based on their climate impact. For flights, the calculations are based on the departure and arrival airports as well as flight class and plane model. For cruises the defining factors are the type of ship, type of cabin and the number of days spent at sea. Calculations also include climate-relevant emissions other than carbon dioxide, such as nitrogen oxides and sooty particles, which contribute to the greenhouse effect, especially at high altitudes (e.g. through ozone buildup or condensation trails). According to a study led by the German Federal Ministry of the Environment, this accounts for a factor of 3–5, meaning that a liter of aviation fuel has a warming effect that is 3–5 times stronger as the effects of its carbon-dioxide emissions alone.

The calculator is available on the Atmosfair website and free to use. After calculating their emissions, the customer can make a donation corresponding to the amount of emissions they want to offset. The corresponding amount of emissions will then be cut elsewhere through climate change mitigation projects.

All projects run by Atmosfair exclusively support climate change mitigation projects that fall within the Clean Development Mechanism (CDM, Kyoto protocol) and comply with the Gold Standard. Projects supported by Atmosfair therefore generate Gold Standard CERs (Certified Emission Reductions) that are then retired accordingly. Atmosfair's policy does not provide for the inclusion of Verified Emission Reduction (VERs), as they do not require the liability of an external auditor.

Beyond flights and cruise ships, Atmosfair also offers carbon offsets for events such as conferences or conventions (MICE).

== Funding ==
The organization is predominantly financed by donations, backed with interest incomes from reserves as well as incomes generated by the sale of carbon emissions calculations software. Climate change mitigation projects and technology purchases led on behalf of customers are an additional source of revenue.

According to the annual reports of 2009 to 2017, at least 90% of donations to Atmosfair were spent directly on projects in developing countries. Since projects are planned to run for many years, payments are made according to need. It can take up to two years for a donation to reach its intended project.

Thus, Atmosfair has greatly exceeded its goal of limiting expenditures for project staff, customer service staff and administration (rent, IT etc.) to 20%.

Year	Revenue	
Year	Donations	Other
2005	166.160 €	144 €
2006	190.113 €	4.263 €
2007	1.328.208 €	46.310 €
2008	2.036.912 €	114.198 €
2009	2.255.464 €	381.899 €
2010	2.153.162 €	978.485 €
2011	1.913.851 €	2.163.050 €
2012	1.962.374 €	1.298.283 €
2013	2.297.204 €	1.641.127 €
2014	3.657.294 €	935.657 €
2015	2.873.114 €	478.520 €
2016	3.509.649 €	675.717 €
2017	6.553.822 €	562.337 €

== Projects ==
In 2017, Atmosfair financed projects in the following four categories:

- Efficient cookstoves: distribution of efficient cookstoves in cooperation with the Global Alliance for Clean Cookstoves. From 2009 to 2017, 763,780 tons of carbon emissions were saved. On average, a stove saves up to 3 tons of carbon per year. The project areas are Nigeria, Rwanda, Cameroon, Lesotho and India.
- Biogas and biomass: construction of small-scale biogas plants, electricity production from harvest residues, composting of organic waste. Between 2007 and 2017, savings amounted to 1,459,800 tons of carbon emissions. On average, a biogas/biomass plant saves around four tons of carbon a year. Project areas are India, Kenya, Thailand and Nepal.
- Wind, water and sun: renewable energy projects saved 549,900 tons of carbon emissions between 2007 and 2017. The hydroelectric power station in Honduras saves around 73 tons of CO_{2} per day and the solar and wind energy stations save around 1,1 tons of CO_{2} per year.
- Environmental education: school projects at German schools.

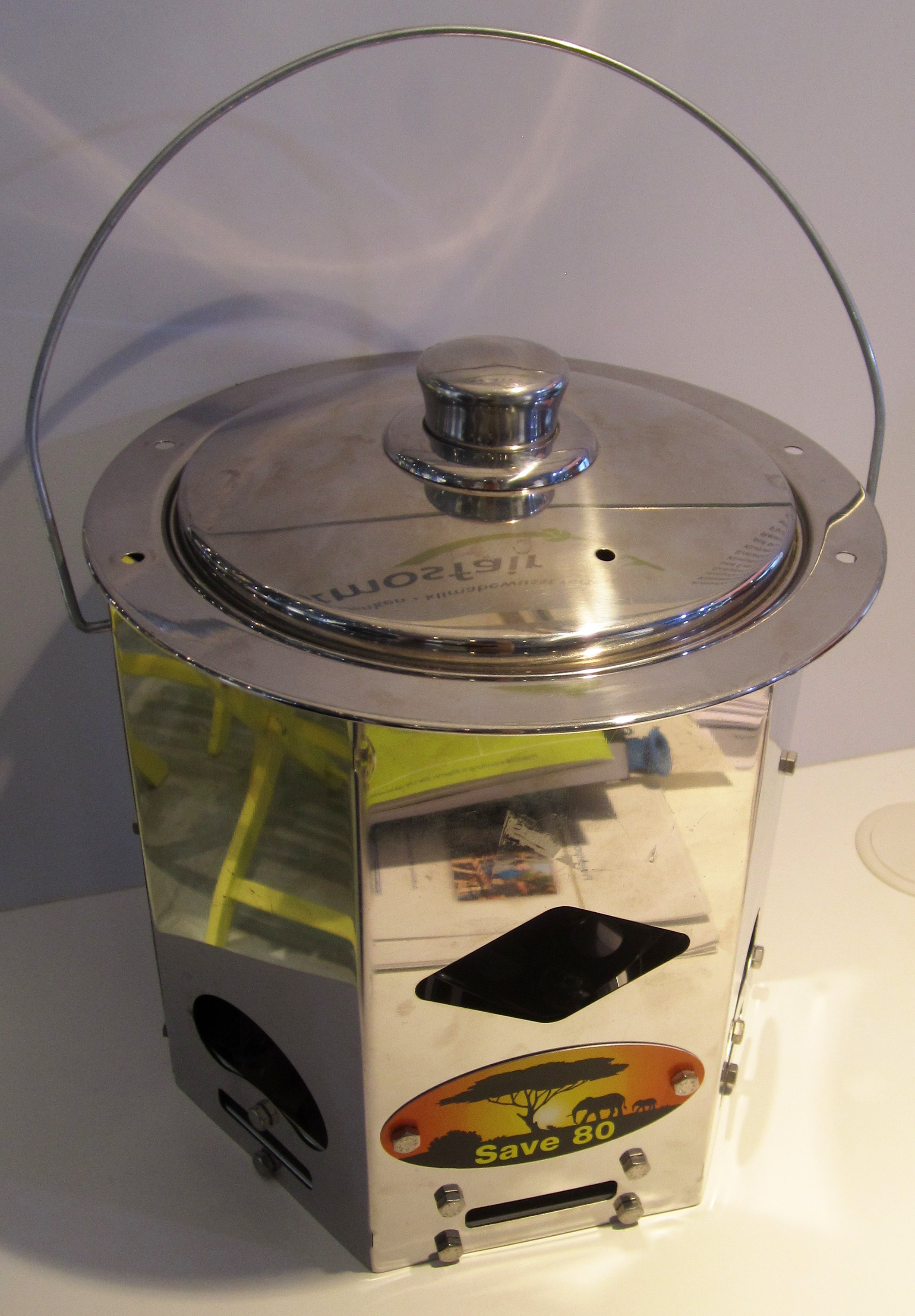
Stove "Save-80" for efficient biomass usage for cooking

== Awards ==
In 2010 a study conducted by the Eberswalde University for Sustainable Development reviewing carbon offset providers in Germany determined Atmosfair as the only provider to achieve the overall rating "very good" ("sehr gut"). In the categories "realistic calculation", "offsetting quality" and "consumer communication", Atmosfair scored the rating "very good".

In 2006 the climate department of the American Tufts University reviewed 13 organizations offering carbon offsetting. Evaluation criteria were transparency, precision of the calculations, offset prices and administration costs. Atmosfair was awarded the rating "very good" along with three other providers.

Furthermore, Atmosfair was awarded first place in following rankings:

- 2018: the German foundation Stiftung Warentest – "Finance test – carbon offsetting: these providers do most for climate change mitigation".
- 2010: Atmosfair was awarded the distinction "unconditionally recommendable" ("uneingeschränkt empfehlenswert") along with two other providers by the Verbraucherzentrale Bundesverband.
- 2009: A comparative study conducted by the University of Graz in which Atmosfair was the only subject that scored "very recommendable". Further, it reached the highest score in the main categories "offsetting quality" and "transparency".
- 2008: A study conducted by the Free University of Brussels rates Atmosfair, as the most recommendable carbon-offset provider.
- 2007: Atmosfair received the highest ranking (8/10 points) in a study by BBC Wildlife magazine.
- 2007: the Swedish daily newspaper Aftonbladet also ranked Atmosfair as top provider for carbon offsets.

Atmosfair is consistently listed among front runners in other rankings and comparative studies.

== Environmental integrity ==
The advisory board, made by representatives of the Federal Ministry of the Environment, Nature Conservation and Nuclear Safety (BMU), acts to ensure the organization's compliance with the standards stated in the annual reports. These include refusing donations from donors whose carbon calculations do not comply with Atmosfair standards. All projects must comply with CDM and Gold Standard; the climate effect of flights must be calculated according to the latest scientific findings and trivializing terms such as "climate neutral" must be avoided.

In 2008, the introduction of additional pollutants into the emissions calculations rendered a cooperation between Atmosfair and Lufthansa impossible. The stance adopted by Atmosfair was well received by the scientific and environmental protection communities as well as by the media.
