= Central Europe Pipeline System =

NATO pipeline system

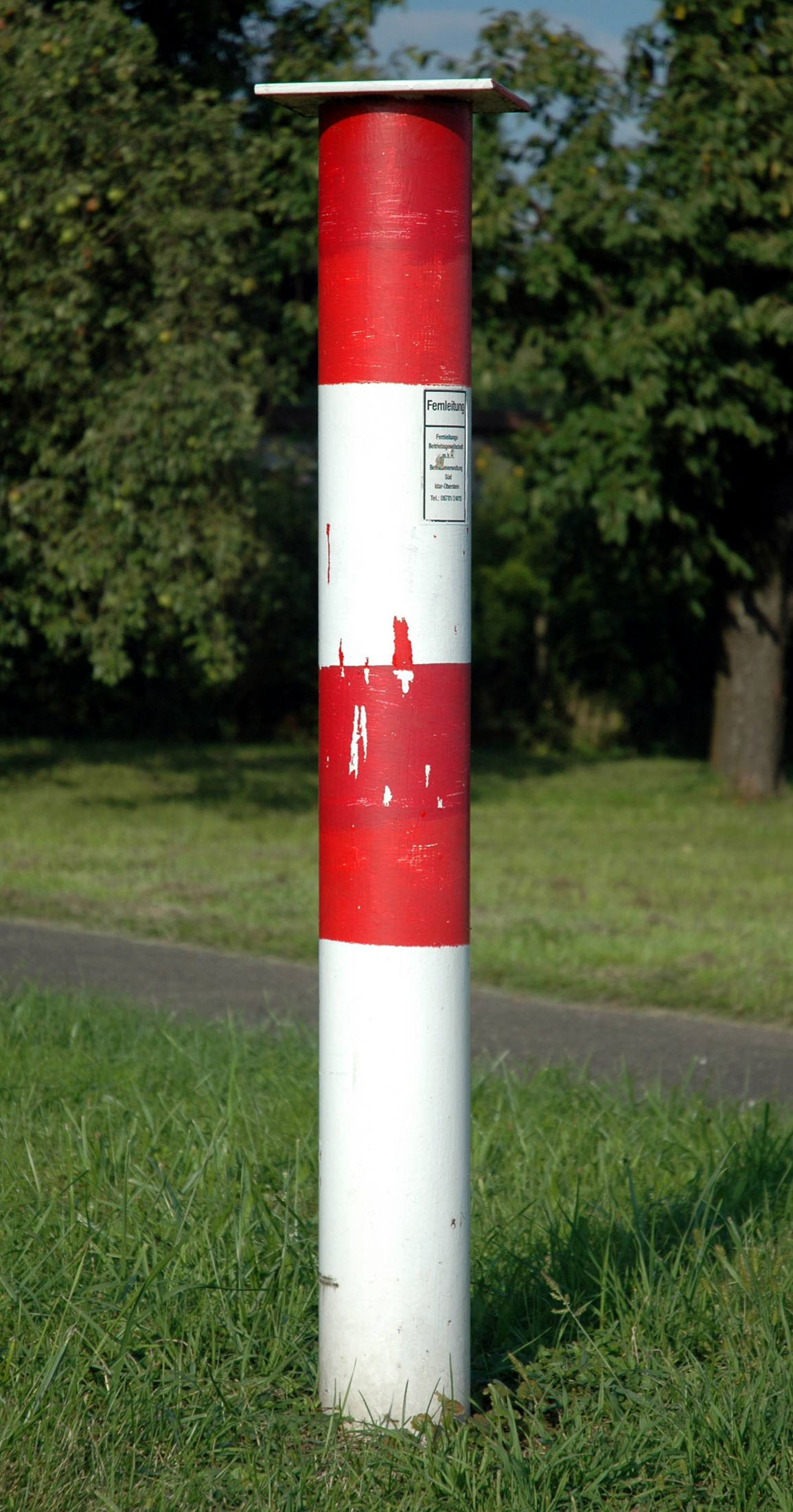
- CEPS pipeline marker near Untergruppenbach in Germany

Location
- Country: Belgium, France, Germany, Luxembourg, Netherlands

General information
- Type: Oil products
- Owner: NATO
- Operator: NATO Support Organisation / CEPS Programme
- Commissioned: 1959

Technical information
- Length: 5,314 km (3,302 mi)

The Central Europe Pipeline System (alternatively Central European Pipeline System), or CEPS for short, is one of several NATO Pipeline Systems and is used to deliver fuel for air and ground vehicles around Europe. Originally conceived for military purposes, it was to aid in safe and quick distribution of fuel for military purposes around Europe. The system consists of over 5,314 kilometres (3,302 mi) of pipeline running through Belgium, France, Germany, Luxembourg and the Netherlands. Besides these host countries, the system is also used by the United States Department of Defense.

Main feeder routes are:

- Marseille–Lyon–Langres–Nancy–Zweibrücken
- Amsterdam–Liège–Trier-Karlsruhe
- Le Havre/Dunkirk–Cambrai–Aachen/Reims–Belfort

A similar system exists for the Northern European countries, known as the Northern European Pipeline System (NEPS).

In 2025, negotiatiations started to extend the network to other countries in Central Europe, including Schwedt (Germany) - Płock (Poland).

== History ==
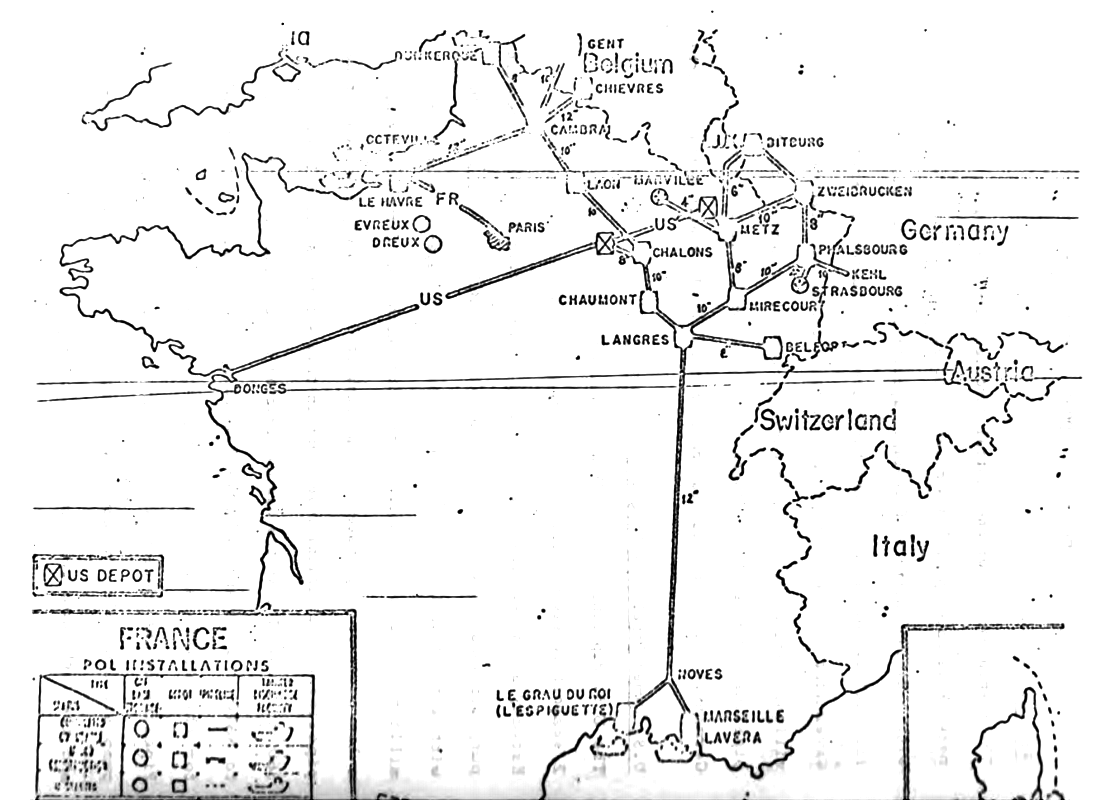
NATO Pipeline France and neighbouring countries, 1970.

The pipeline system was founded in the late 1950s by NATO, being funded as part of the NATO Common Infrastructure Program, with the various participating countries already having some of the infrastructure and capabilities required to operate such a system.

In the 1980s, the pipeline was attacked several times by terrorist organizations. The Belgian communist terrorist organisation Communist Combatant Cells carried out five bombings against the pipeline on 11 December 1984, and one more attack on 6 December 1985. Earlier that year, in April 1985, a bomb attack was carried out against a part of the pipeline in Southern-Germany by Red Army Faction sympathisers.

At the end of the Cold War the system was significantly reduced as various military airports that used the system were closed, such as Bitburg Air Base and Soesterberg Air Base. However, in some other places expansion of the pipeline continued and in October 2008 construction of 80 kilometres (50 mi) of additional pipeline was completed between Aalen and Leipheim.

Since 1959, excess capacity of the pipeline may be used by civilian users. Currently, around 90% of the fuel transported through the system is for civilian users, customers including various large European airports such as Amsterdam Airport Schiphol, Brussels Airport, Frankfurt am Main Airport, Luxembourg Airport, Cologne Bonn Airport and Zürich Airport.

The operating company for German territory is Fernleitungsbetriebsgesellschaft GmbH (FBG) headquartered in Bad Godesberg and established in 1956. FBG is a parent of Industrieverwaltungsgesellschaft (IVG). In war times, it is operated by the armed forces of the NATO countries where the part of the pipeline is located.

For Belgium and Luxembourg, the operating company Belgian Pipeline Organisation (BPO) is headquartered in Leuven. BPO is part of the Belgian Defense.

In the Netherlands, the pipelines are operated by the Defense Pipeline Organisation (DPO). DPO is part of the Dutch Ministry of Defence.

The construction of a 300-kilometer pipeline from the German border to the base of the Polish operator PERN near Bydgoszcz is announced for October 3, 2025, as part of a project that will reach a value of 20 billion zlotys.
