= Aviation fuel =

Fuel used to power aircraft

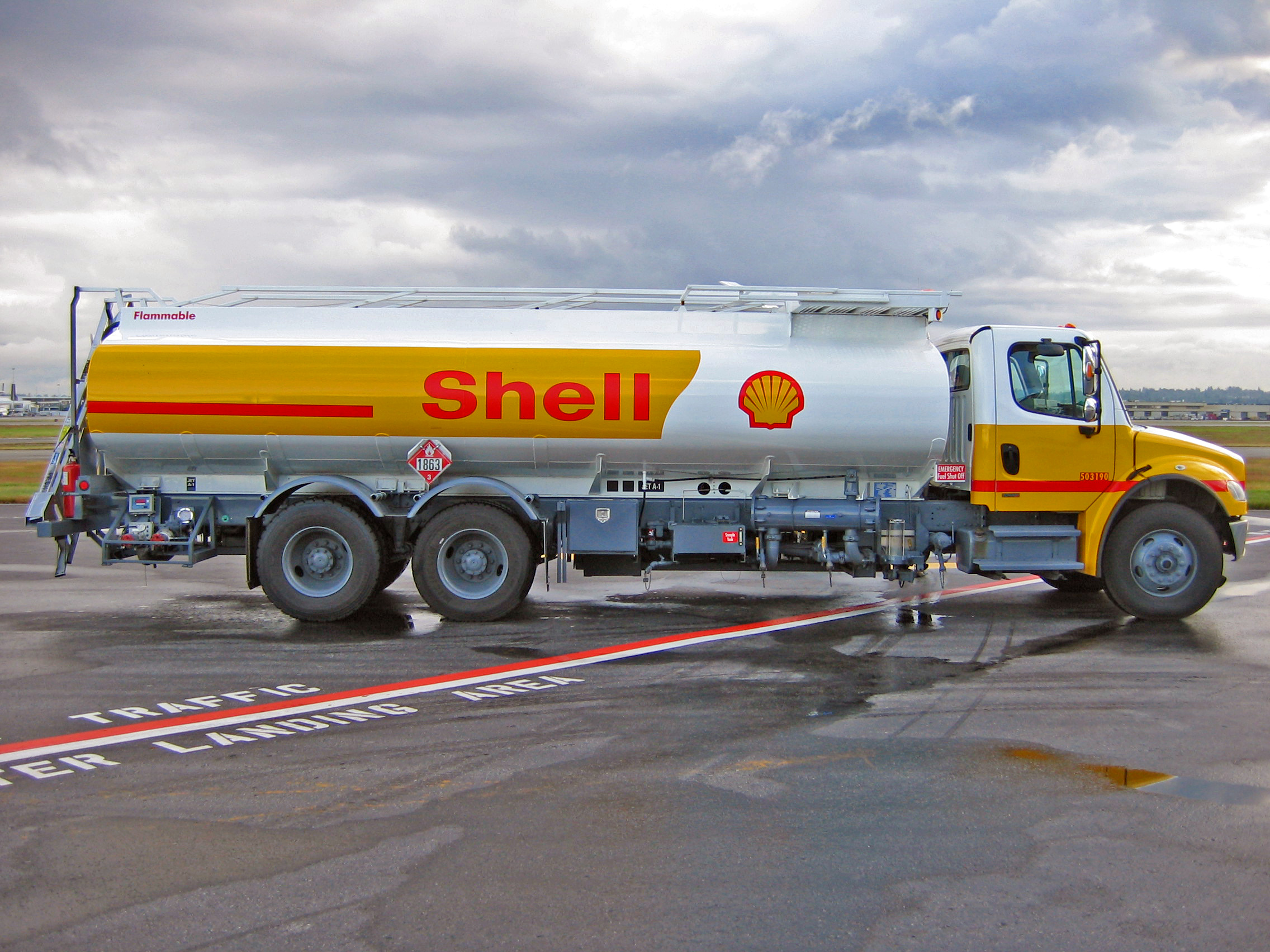
Shell aviation fuel truck

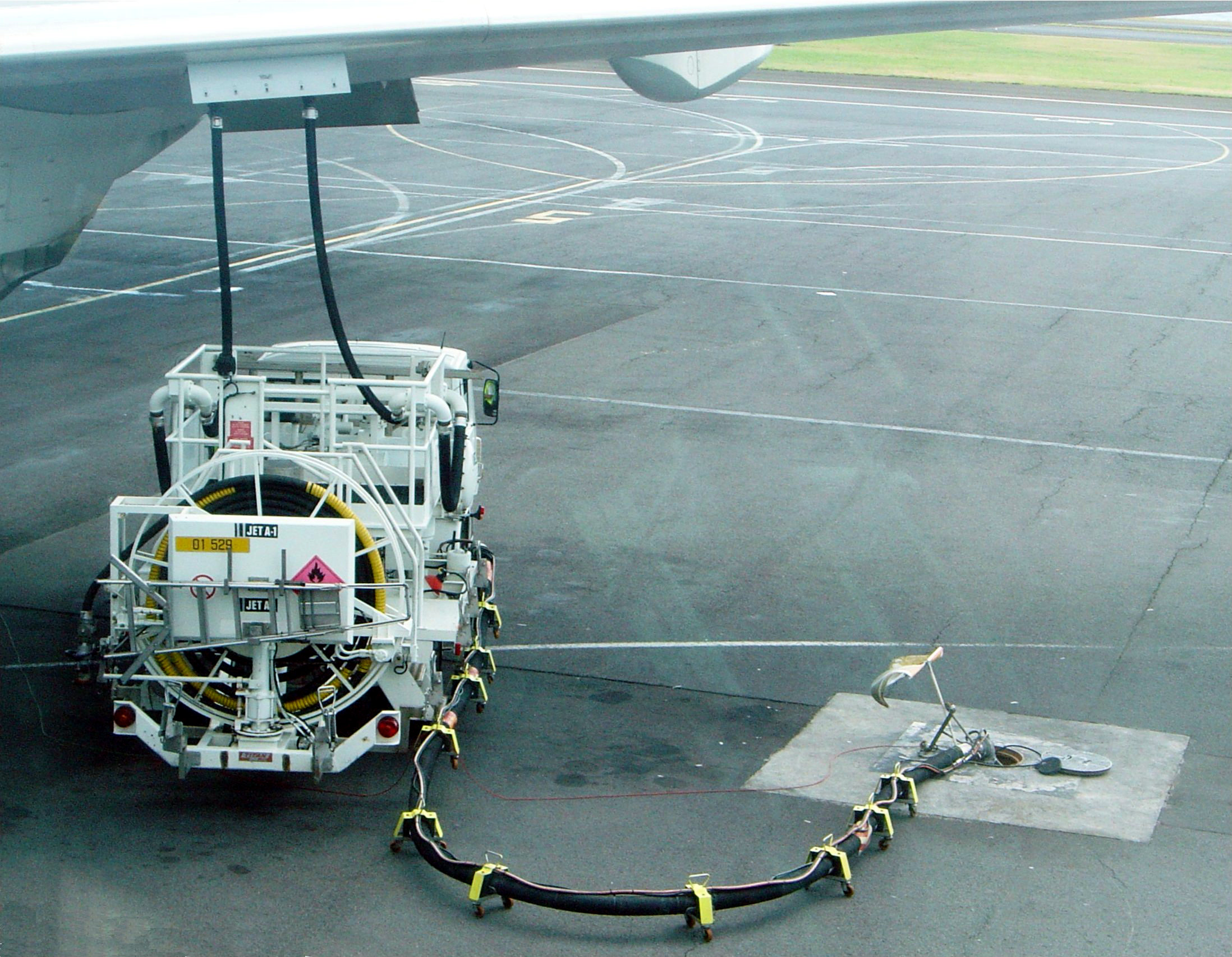
At some airports, underground fuel pipes allow refueling without the need for tank trucks. Trucks carry the necessary hoses and pumping equipment, but no fuel.

Aviation fuels are either derived from petroleum or are blends of petroleum and synthetic fuels, and are used to power aircraft. These fuels have more stringent requirements than those used for ground-based applications, such as heating or road transportation. They also contain additives designed to enhance or preserve specific properties that are important for performance and handling. Most aviation fuels are kerosene-based—such as JP-8 and Jet A-1—and are used in gas turbine-powered aircraft. Piston-engined aircraft typically use leaded gasoline, whilst those equipped with diesel engines may use jet fuel (kerosene). As of 2012, all U.S. Air Force aircraft had been certified to operate on a 50-50 blend of kerosene and synthetic fuel derived from coal or natural gas, as part of an initiative to stabilize fuel costs.

== Types of aviation fuel ==
=== Conventional aviation fuels ===
==== Jet fuel ====
Jet fuel is a clear to straw-colored fuel, based on either an unleaded kerosene (Jet A-1), or a naphtha–kerosene blend (Jet B). Similar to diesel fuel, it can be used in either compression ignition engines or turbine engines.

Jet-A is a kerosene based fuel with a minimum flash point of 38 °C (100 °F). Kerosene-based fuel has a much higher flash point than gasoline-based fuel, meaning that it requires significantly higher temperature to ignite. It is a high-quality fuel; if it fails the purity and other quality tests for use on jet aircraft, it is sold to ground-based users with less demanding requirements, such as railroads.

==== Avgas ====
Avgas (aviation gasoline), or aviation spirit, is used by small aircraft, light helicopters and vintage piston-engined aircraft. Its formulation is distinct from the conventional gasoline (UK: petrol) used in motor vehicles, which is commonly called mogas or autogas in aviation context. Although it comes in many different grades, its octane ratings are generally much higher than those of road motor gasoline.

=== Emerging aviation fuels ===
==== Biofuels ====
Alternatives to conventional fossil-based aviation fuels, new fuels made via the biomass to liquid method (like sustainable aviation fuel) and certain straight vegetable oils can also be used.

Fuels such as sustainable aviation fuel have the advantage that few or no modifications are necessary on the aircraft itself, provided that the fuel characteristics meet specifications for lubricity and density as well as adequately swelling elastomer seals in current aircraft fuel systems. Sustainable aviation fuel and blends of fossil and sustainably-sourced alternative fuels yield lower emissions of particles and greenhouse gases (GHGs). They are, however, not being used heavily, because they still face political, technological, and economic barriers, such as currently being more expensive than conventionally produced aviation fuels by a wide margin.

==== Compressed natural gas and liquified natural gas ====
Compressed natural gas (CNG) and liquified natural gas (LNG) are fuel feedstocks that aircraft may use in the future. Studies have been done on the feasibility of using natural gas and include the "SUGAR Freeze" aircraft under NASA's N+4 Advanced Concept Development program (made by Boeing's Subsonic Ultra Green Aircraft Research (SUGAR) team). The Tupolev Tu-155 was an alternative fuel testbed which was fuelled on LNG. The lower density of volumetric energy for natural gas, even liquid natural gas, is a disadvantage for flight application compared to other more conventional fuel types.

==== Liquid hydrogen ====
Hydrogen can be used largely free of carbon emissions, if it is produced with power from renewable energy like wind and solar power.

Some development of technology for hydrogen-powered aircraft started after the millennium and gained track since about 2020, but as of 2022 was still far away from outright aircraft product development.

Hydrogen fuel cells do not produce CO_{2} or other emissions (besides water). However, hydrogen combustion does produce NO_{x} emissions. Cryogenic hydrogen can be used as a liquid at temperatures below 20 K (−253.2 °C; −423.7 °F). Gaseous hydrogen involves pressurized tanks at 250–350 bar (25–35 MPa; 3,600–5,100 psi). With materials available in the 2020s, the mass of tanks strong enough to withstand this kind of high pressure will greatly outweigh the hydrogen fuel itself, largely negating the weight to energy advantage of hydrogen fuel over hydrocarbon fuels. Hydrogen has a severe volumetric disadvantage relative to hydrocarbon fuels, but future blended wing body aircraft designs might be able to accommodate this extra volume without greatly expanding the wetted area.

Even if finally practical, the industry timeline for adopting hydrogen is fairly lengthy. Alternatives to conventional aviation fuel available in the near term include aviation biofuel and synthetically created fuel (aka "e-jet"). These fuels are collectively referred to as "Sustainable Aviation Fuel" (SAF).

== Production of aviation fuel ==
The production of aviation fuel falls into two categories: fuel suitable for turbine engines and fuel suitable for spark-ignition piston engines. There are international specifications for each.

Jet fuel is a gas turbine fuel used in propeller and jet fixed-wing aircraft and helicopters. It has a low viscosity at low temperature, has limited ranges of density and calorific value, burns cleanly, and remains chemically stable when heated to high temperature.

Aviation gasoline, often referred to as avgas or 100-LL (low-lead), is a highly refined form of gasoline for aircraft, with an emphasis on purity, anti-knock characteristics and minimization of spark plug fouling. Avgas must meet performance guidelines for both the rich mixture condition required for take-off power settings and the leaner mixtures used during cruise to reduce fuel consumption. Aviation fuel can be used as CNG fuel.

Avgas is sold in much lower volume than jet fuel, but to many more individual aircraft operators, whereas jet fuel is sold in high volume to large aircraft operators, such as airlines and militaries.

== Energy content ==
The net energy content for aviation fuels depends on their composition. Some typical values are:

- BP Avgas 80, 44.65 MJ/kg (19,200 BTU/lb), density at 15 °C (59 °F) is 690 kg/m^{3} (43 lb/ft^{3}) (30.81 MJ/litre).
- Kerosene type BP Jet A-1, 43.15 MJ/kg (18,550 BTU/lb), density at 15 °C is 804 kg/m^{3} (50.2 lb/ft^{3}) (34.69 MJ/litre).
- Kerosene type BP Jet TS-1 (for lower temperatures), 43.2 MJ/kg (18,600 BTU/lb), density at 15 °C is 787 kg/m^{3} (49.1 lb/ft^{3}) (34.00 MJ/litre).

== Density ==
In performance calculations, airliner manufacturers use a density of jet fuel around 0.80 kg/L (6.7 lb/US gal; 8 lb/imp gal).

Specific cases are:

- Bombardier Aerospace: The Challenger Multi-role Aircraft is a special mission variant of the Bombardier Challenger 650 business jet platform. Bombardier bases performance on the use of fuel with an average lower heating value of 18,550 BTU/lb (43.1 MJ/kg) and a density of 0.809 kg/L (6.75 lb/US gal).
- Embraer: In its airport planning manual for the E195, Embraer uses an adopted fuel density of 0.811 kg/L (6.77 lb/US gal).

== Chemical composition ==
Aviation fuels consist of blends of over two thousand chemicals, primarily hydrocarbons (paraffins, olefins, naphthenes, and aromatics), additives such as antioxidants and metal deactivators, biocides, static reducers, icing inhibitors, corrosion inhibitors, and impurities. Principal components include n-heptane and isooctane. Like other fuels, aviation fuel for spark-ignited piston engines are described by their octane rating.

Alcohol, alcohol mixtures, and other alternative fuels may be used experimentally, but alcohol is not permitted in any certified aviation fuel specification. In Brazil, the Embraer Ipanema EMB-202A is a version of the Ipanema agricultural aircraft with a modified Lycoming IO-540-K1J5 engine so as to be able to run on ethanol. Other aircraft engines that were modified to run on 100% ethanol were several other types of Lycoming engines (including the Lycoming 235N2C, and Lycoming IO-320) and certain Rotax engines.

== Tax ==
The Convention on International Civil Aviation (ICAO) (Chicago 1944, Article 24) exempts air fuels already loaded onto an aircraft on landing (and which remain on the aircraft) from import taxes. Bi-lateral air services agreements traditionally govern the tax exemption of aviation fuels. In terms to EU-level agreements, with the example case of Brazil, the EU has replaced provisions so that the fuel can be directly taxed for operations within the EU. A motion for a European Parliament resolution on a European Strategy for Low-emission Mobility has stated that "the possibilities for harmonised international measures for kerosene taxation for aviation" needs to be explored.

A worry is that a local aviation fuel tax would cause increased tankering, where airlines carry extra fuel from low tax jurisdictions. This extra weight increases fuel burn, thus a local fuel tax could potentially increase overall fuel consumption. To avoid increased tankering, a worldwide aviation fuel tax has been proposed.

During a debate in the UK Parliament, the foregone tax income due to the exemption of tax on aviation fuel was estimated at £10 billion annually.

The planned inclusion of international aviation into the European Union Emission Trading Scheme in 2014 has been called an "illegal tax" by countries including the US and China, which cite the Chicago Convention.

== Certification ==
Fuels have to conform to a specification in order to be approved for use in type certificated aircraft. The American Society for Testing and Materials (ASTM) developed specifications for automobile gasoline as well as aviation gasoline. These specifications are ASTM D910 and ASTM D6227 for aviation gasoline and ASTM D439 or ASTM D4814 (latest revision) for automobile gasoline.

== In use ==
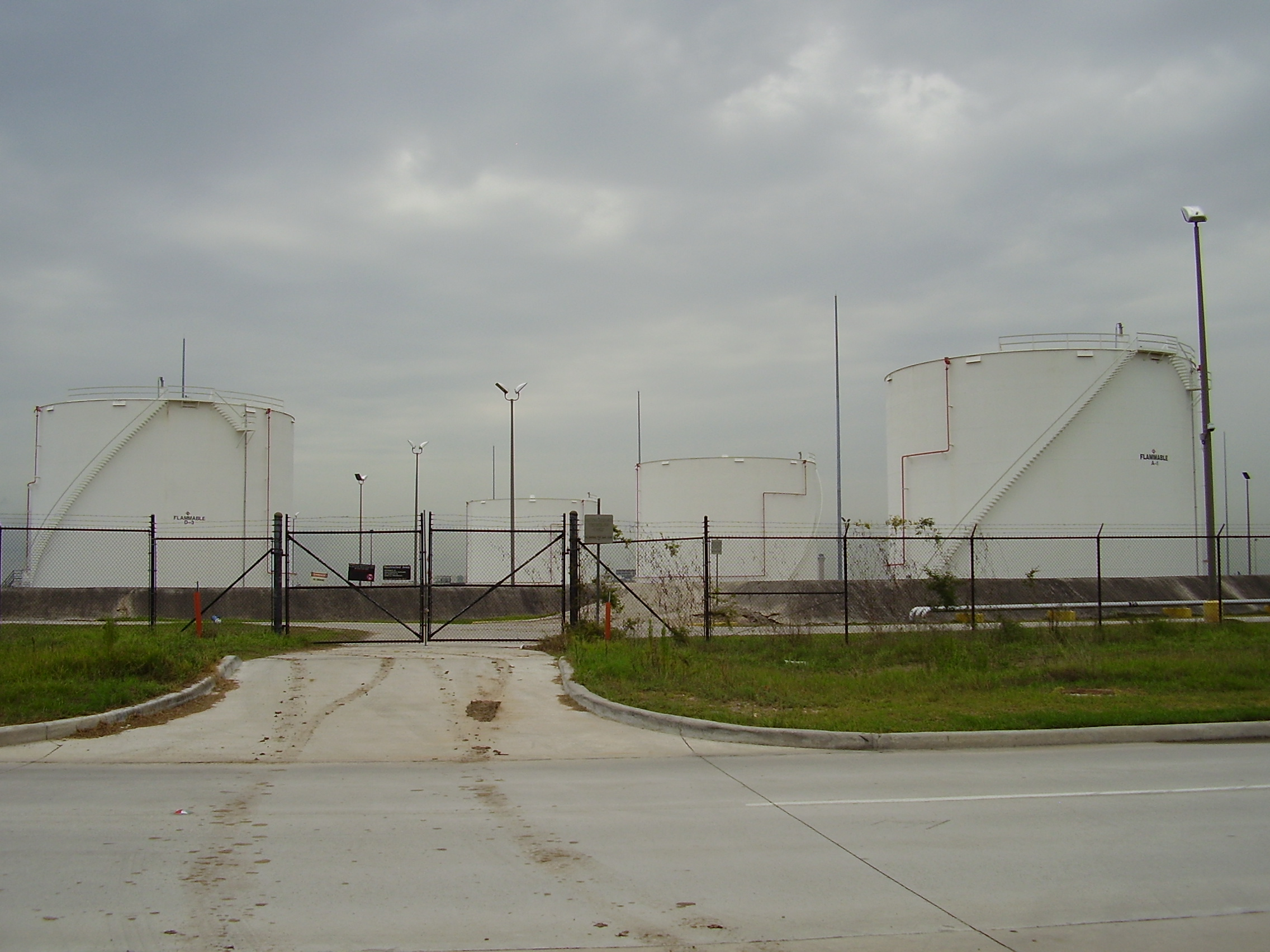
Aviation fuel storage tanks at George Bush Intercontinental Airport, Houston, Texas

Aviation fuel generally arrives at the airport via pipeline systems, such as the CEPS. It is then pumped over and dispensed from a tanker or bowser. The fuel is then driven up to parked aircraft and helicopters. Some airports have pumps similar to filling stations to which aircraft must taxi. Some airports have permanent piping to parking areas for large aircraft.

Aviation fuel is transferred to an aircraft via one of two methods: overwing or underwing.

=== Overwing ===
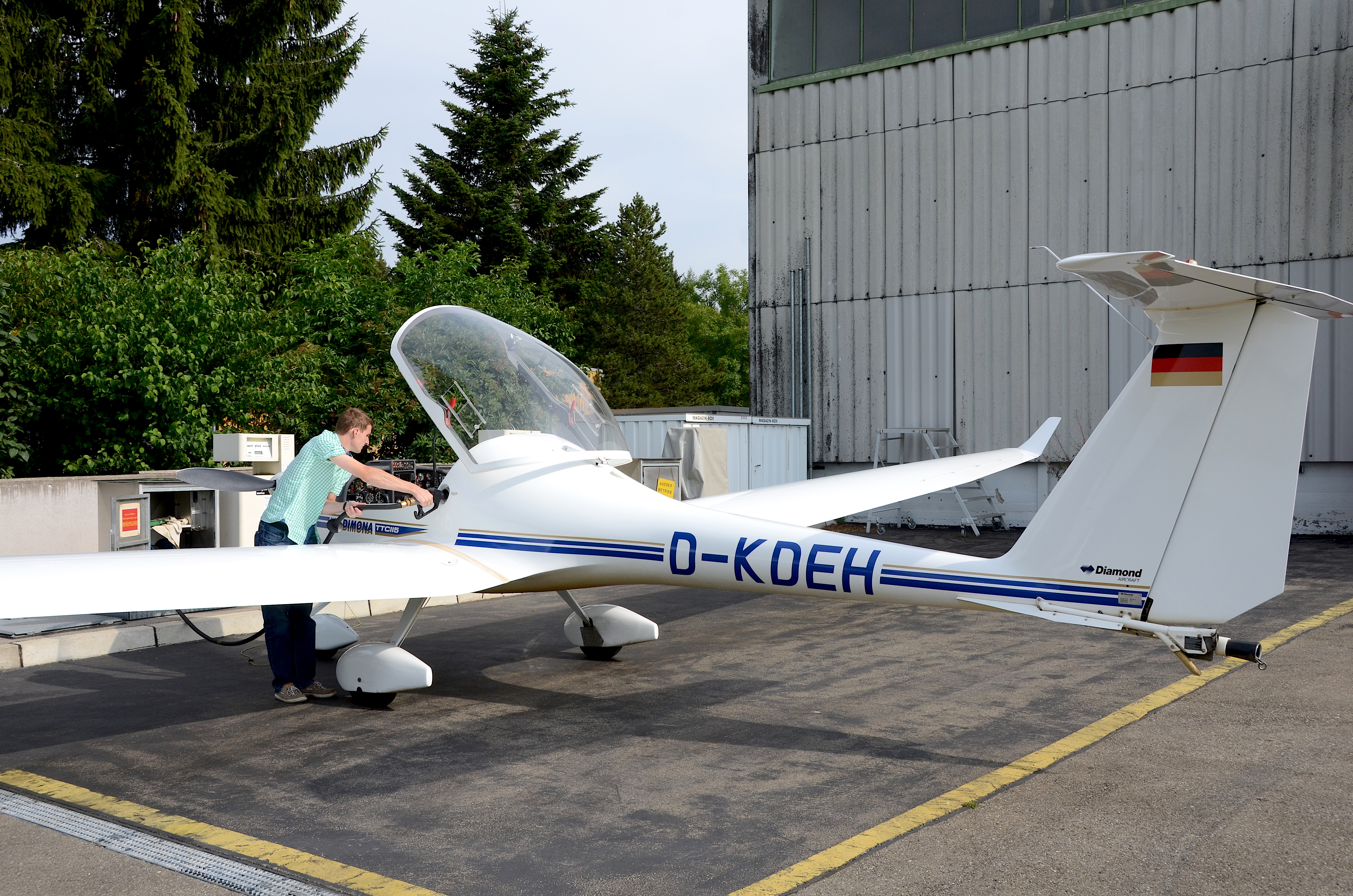
Refueling a HK36-TTC Super Dimona

Overwing fueling is used on smaller planes, helicopters, and all piston-engine aircraft. Overwing fueling is similar to car fueling — one or more fuel ports are opened and fuel is pumped in with a conventional pump.

=== Underwing ===
Most widebody aircraft use a double single-point.

Underwing fueling, also called single-point refueling or pressure refueling where not dependent on gravity, is used on larger aircraft and for jet fuel exclusively.

For pressure refueling, a high-pressure hose is attached and fuel is pumped in at 275 kPa (39.9 psi) and a maximum of 310 kPa (45 psi) for most commercial aircraft. Pressure for military aircraft, especially fighters, ranges up to 415 kPa (60.2 psi). Air being displaced in the tanks is usually vented overboard through a single vent on the aircraft. Because there is only one attachment point, fuel distribution between tanks is either automated or controlled from a control panel, either at the fueling point or in the cockpit. An early use of pressure refueling was on the de Havilland Comet and Sud Aviation Caravelle. Larger aircraft allow for two or more attachment points; however, this is still referred to as single-point refueling, as either attachment point can refuel all of the tanks. Multiple attachments allow for a faster flowrate.

=== Misfueling ===
Because of the danger of confusing the fuel types, precautions are taken to distinguish between avgas and jet fuel beyond clearly marking all containers, vehicles, and piping. The aperture on fuel tanks of aircraft requiring avgas cannot be greater than 60 mm (2.4 in) in diameter. Avgas is often dyed and is dispensed from nozzles with a diameter of 40 mm (1.6 in) (49 mm (1.9 in) in the United States).

Jet fuel is clear to straw-colored and is dispensed from a special nozzle, called a J spout or duckbill, that has a rectangular opening larger than 60 mm diagonally, so as not to fit into avgas ports. However, some jet and other turbine aircraft, such as some models of the Astar helicopter, have a fueling port too small for the J spout, and thus require a smaller nozzle.

=== Forecasting demand ===
In recent years, fuel markets have become increasingly volatile. This, along with rapidly changing airline schedules and the desire to not carry excess fuel on board aircraft, has increased the importance of demand forecasting. In March 2022, Austin's Austin–Bergstrom International Airport came close to running out of fuel, potentially stranding aircraft. Common forecasting techniques include tracking airline schedules and routes, expected distance flown, ground procedures, fuel efficiency of each aircraft and the impact of environmental factors like weather and temperature.

== Safety precautions ==
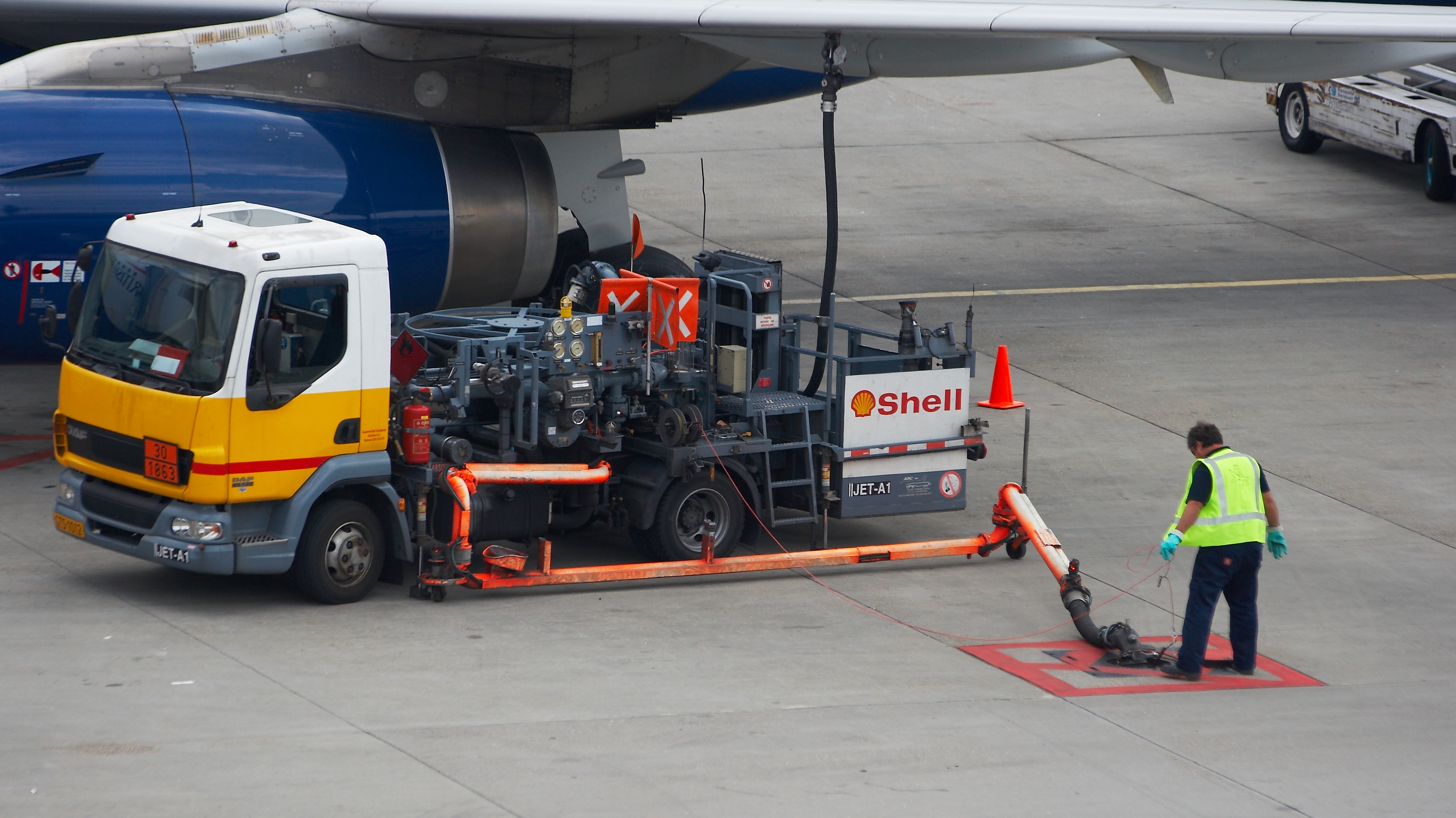
British Airways Airbus A321 being refueled

Any fueling operation can be very dangerous, and aviation operations have characteristics which must be accommodated. As an aircraft flies through the air, it can accumulate static electricity. If this is not dissipated before fueling, an electric arc could occur and ignite fuel vapors. To prevent this, aircraft are electrically bonded to the fueling apparatus before fueling begins, and are not disconnected until after fueling is complete. Some regions require the aircraft and/or fuel truck to be grounded too. Pressure fueling systems incorporate a dead man's switch to preclude unmonitored operation.

Aviation fuel can cause severe environmental damage; all fueling vehicles must carry equipment to control fuel spills. Fire extinguishers must be present at any fueling operation. Airport firefighting forces are specially trained and equipped to handle aviation fuel fires and spills. Aviation fuel must be checked daily and before every flight for contaminants such as water or dirt.

Avgas is the only remaining lead-containing transportation fuel. Lead in avgas prevents damaging engine knock, or detonation, that can result in a sudden engine failure.

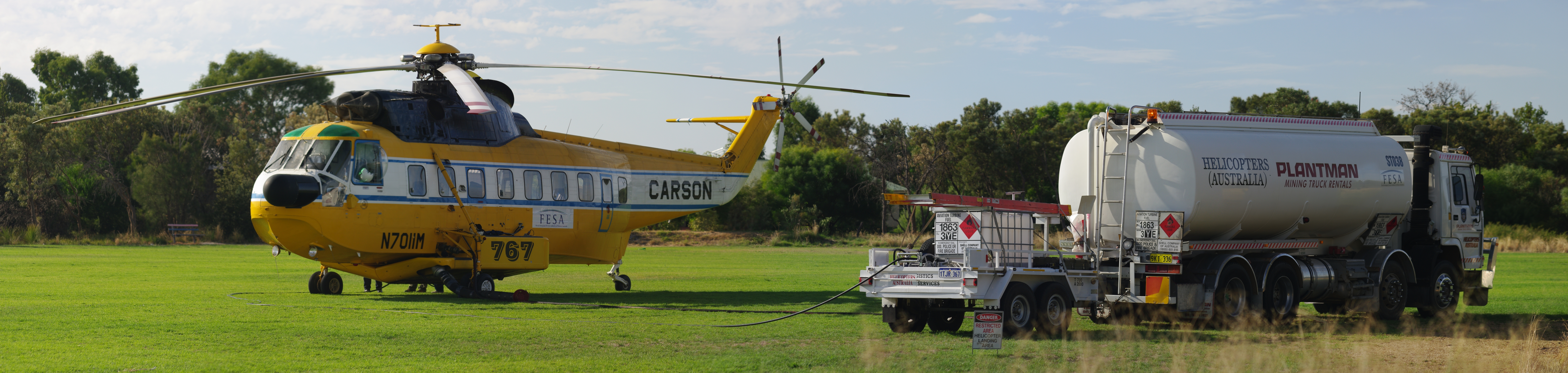
A Carson Helicopters S-61N Fire King being refueled during firefighting operations in Southern River, Western Australia

== See also ==
- Environmental impact of aviation
- Rocket fuel
- Swift fuel
