= National Communications System =

NCS seal

The National Communications System (NCS) was an office within the United States Department of Homeland Security charged with enabling national security and emergency preparedness communications (NS/EP telecommunications) using the national telecommunications system. The NCS was disbanded by Executive Order 13618 on July 6, 2012.

== Background and history ==
The genesis of the NCS began in 1962 after the Cuban Missile Crisis when communications problems among the United States, the Union of Soviet Socialist Republics, the North Atlantic Treaty Organization, and foreign heads of state threatened to complicate the crisis further. After the crisis, President John F. Kennedy ordered an investigation of national security communications, and the National Security Council (NSC) formed an interdepartmental committee to examine the communications networks and institute changes. This interdepartmental committee recommended the formation of a single unified communications system to serve the president, Department of Defense, diplomatic and intelligence activities, and civilian leaders. Consequently, in order to provide better communications support to critical government functions during emergencies, President Kennedy established the National Communications System by a Presidential Memorandum on August 21, 1963. The NCS mandate included linking, improving, and extending the communications facilities and components of various Federal agencies, focusing on interconnectivity and survivability.

On April 3, 1984, President Ronald Reagan signed Executive Order 12472 which broadened the NCS' national security and emergency preparedness (NS/EP) capabilities and superseded President Kennedy's original 1963 memorandum. The NCS expanded from its original six members to an interagency group of 23 federal departments and agencies, and began coordinating and planning NS/EP telecommunications to support crises and disasters.

With the addition of the Office of the Director of National Intelligence (ODNI) on September 30, 2007, the NCS membership stood at 24 members.

Each NCS member organization was represented on the NCS through the Committee of Principals (COP) – and its subordinate Council of Representatives (COR). The COP, formed as a result of Executive Order 12472, provided advice and recommendations to the NCS and the National Security Council through the President's Critical Infrastructure Protection Board on NS/EP telecommunications and its ties to other critical infrastructures. The NCS also participated in joint industry-Government planning through its work with the President's National Security Telecommunications Advisory Committee (NSTAC), with the NCS's National Coordinating Center for Telecommunications (NCC) and the NCC's subordinate Information Sharing and Analysis Center (ISAC).

After nearly forty years with the Secretary of Defense serving as its Executive Agent, President George W. Bush transferred the National Communications System to the Department of Homeland Security (DHS). The NCS was one of 22 federal agencies transferred to the department on March 1, 2003, in accordance with Executive Order 13286. A revised Executive Order 12472 reflects the changes of E.O. 13286. On November 15, 2005, the NCS became part of the department's Directorate for Preparedness after nearly two years under the Information Analysis and Infrastructure Protection Directorate. In March 2007 the NCS became an entity of the National Protection and Programs Directorate. The DHS Under Secretary for National Protection and Programs Directorate served as the NCS Manager.

On July 6, 2012, President Barack Obama signed Executive Order 13618, which replaced Executive Order 12472, thus eliminating the NCS as a separate organization; it was merged into the Office of Emergency Communications (OEC) of DHS' National Preparedness and Programs Directorate (NPPD) which had been created in 2007. A ceremony to retire the colors of the NCS and to celebrate the legacy of the organization was held on August 30, 2012 in Arlington, VA. Upon establishment of the Cybersecurity and Infrastructure Security Agency (CISA) the OEC was renamed the Emergency Communications Division (ECD).

The President's National Security Telecommunications Advisory Committee helps strengthen United States national security, enhancing cybersecurity, maintaining the global communications infrastructure, assuring communications for disaster response, and addressing critical infrastructure interdependencies and dependencies. On September 29, 2017, President Donald Trump renewed several committees including the President's National Security Telecommunications Advisory Committee.

== Services ==
In fulfillment of their mission to enable emergency communications, the NCS has created a number of different services.

- NS/EP Priority Telecommunications
  - Government Emergency Telecommunications Service (GETS) - provides emergency access and priority processing in the local and long distance segments of the public switched wireline network. Used in an emergency or crisis situation during which the probability of completing a call over normal or other alternate telecommunication means has significantly decreased.
  - Telecommunications Service Priority (TSP) - provides service vendors with a Federal Communications Commission (FCC) mandate for prioritizing service requests by identifying those services critical to NS/EP. A telecommunications service with a TSP assignment is assured of receiving full attention by the service vendor before a non-TSP service.
  - Wireless Priority Service (WPS) - provides priority cellular network access. The WPS was approved by the FCC for NS/EP requirements on a call-by-call priority basis. The NCS executes the program on behalf of the Executive Office of the President. Only individuals in NS/EP key leadership positions are authorized use of WPS.
- National Coordinating Center (NCC) for Telecommunications
  - Alerting and Coordination Network (ACN) - The Alerting and Coordination Network (ACN) provides a stable emergency voice communications network connecting telecommunications service providers’ Emergency Operations Centers (EOCs) and Network Operations Centers (NOCs) to support national security and emergency preparedness (NS/EP) telecommunications network restoration coordination, transmission of telecommunications requirements and priorities, and incident reporting when the Public Switched Network (PSN) is inoperable, stressed or congested. It is engineered to provide a reliable and survivable network capability, and, as such, has no logical dependency on the PSN. As a result, if the PSN suffers disruptions, the ACN will not be affected.
  - Shared Resources High Frequency Radio Program (SHARES) - The SHARES HF Radio Program brings together the assets of over 1,000 HF radio stations worldwide to voluntarily pass emergency messages when normal communications are destroyed or unavailable. SHARES uses common radio operating and message formatting procedures and more than 250 designated frequencies. Participation in SHARES is open to all Federal departments and agencies and their designated affiliates on a voluntary basis. More than 90 Federal, state, and industry organizations currently contribute resources throughout the United States and in 26 countries and U.S. possessions
  - Telecom ISAC - In January 2000, the National Coordinator for Security, Infrastructure Protection, and Counterterrorism designated the NCC-ISAC as the ISAC for telecommunications. On March 1, 2000, the NCC-ISAC commenced operations. The initial NCC-ISAC membership is based on NCC membership, which is evolving to reflect a broader base of technologies comprising the telecommunications infrastructure. NCC-ISAC will support the mission assigned by Executive Order 12472 and the national critical infrastructure protection goals of government and industry. The NCC-ISAC will facilitate voluntary collaboration and information sharing among its participants gathering information on vulnerabilities, threats, intrusions, and anomalies from telecommunications industry, government, and other sources. The NCC-ISAC will analyze the data with the goal of averting or mitigating impact upon the telecommunications infrastructure. Additionally, data will be used to establish baseline statistics and patterns and maintained to provide a library of historical data. Results will be sanitized and disseminated in accordance with sharing agreements established for that purpose by the NCC-ISAC participants.
- Emergency Response Training (ERT)
  - Planning, Training, and Exercise Support (PTE) - Our mission is to ensure NCS readiness, enhance partnerships within government and industry, coordinate telecommunications operational planning among NCS elements, develop emergency response requirements, and to provide skilled civilians and reservists during crises and emergencies.
  - Individual Mobilization Augmentee (IMA) - The National Communications System (NCS) Augmentee Program was established in 1988 to provide a cadre of skilled civilian and military reservists to enhance the efforts of the Office of the Manager, NCS (OMNCS), the National Coordinating Center for Telecommunications (NCC), and NCS Regional Managers (RMs) during national crises and emergencies. The NCS Augmentee Program consists of two components: the civilian members of the National Defense Executive Reserve (NDER) and the U.S. Army reservists participating in the Individual Mobilization Augmentee (IMA) Program.

== See also ==
- Civil defense
- Defense Switched Network
- Emergency Alert System
- Moscow–Washington hotline
- Warrenton Training Center
