= Essential service =

Essential service may refer to:

- Essential service, the telecommunications service feature
- Essential services, a class of occupations with legislated restricted rights to strike
- Essential services (public health), a working definition of public health and a guiding framework for the responsibilities of local public health systems
