= Disaster response =

Second phase of the disaster management cycle

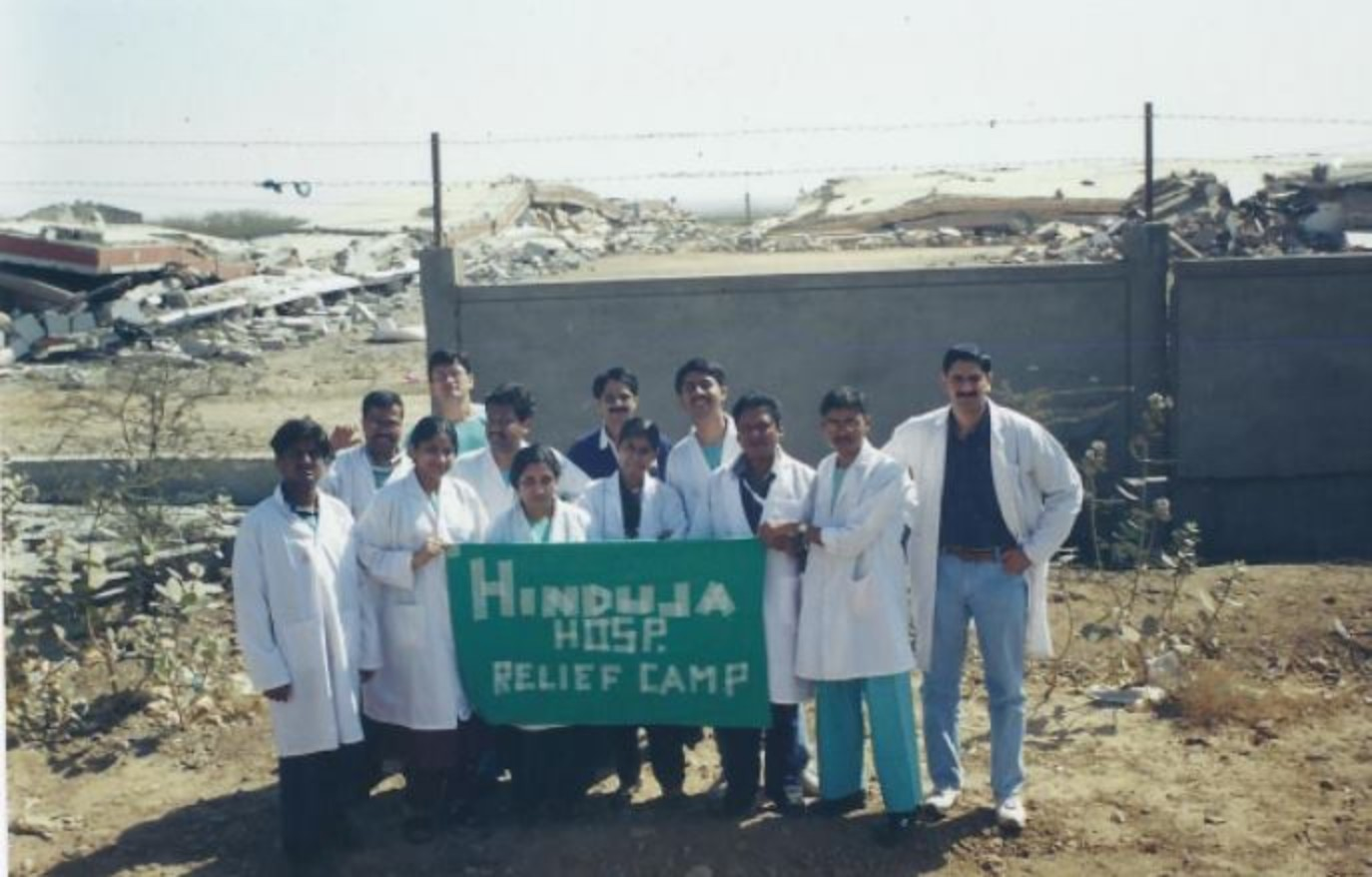
Relief camp at Bhuj after the 2001 Gujarat earthquake

Disaster response refers to the actions taken directly before, during, or immediately after a disaster. The objective is to save lives, ensure health and safety, and meet the subsistence needs of the people affected. It includes warning and evacuation, search and rescue, providing immediate assistance, assessing damage, continuing assistance, and the immediate restoration or construction of infrastructure. An example of this would be building provisional storm drains or diversion dams. Emergency response aims to provide immediate help to keep people alive, improve their health and support their morale. It can involve specific but limited aid, such as helping refugees with transport, temporary shelter, and food, or it can involve establishing semi-permanent settlements in camps and other locations. It may also involve initial repairs to damage to infrastructure, or diverting it.

The response phase focuses on keeping people safe, preventing the next disasters and meeting people's basic needs until more permanent and sustainable solutions are available. The governments where the disaster has happened have the main responsibility for addressing these needs. Humanitarian organisations are often present in this phase of the disaster management cycle. This is especially true in places where the government does not have the resources for a full response.

== Definition ==
Disaster response refers to the actions taken directly before, during or in the immediate aftermath of a disaster. The objective is to save lives, ensure health and safety and to meet the subsistence needs of the people affected.

The Business Dictionary provide a more comprehensive definition for "disaster response"; Aggregate of decisions and measures to (1) contain or mitigate the effects of a disastrous event to prevent any further loss of life and/or property, (2) restore order in its immediate aftermath, and (3) re-establish normality through reconstruction and re-rehabilitation shortly thereafter. The first and immediate response is called an emergency response.

The Johns Hopkins and the International Federation of Red Cross and Red Crescent Societies (IFRC) state: "The word disaster implies a sudden overwhelming and unforeseen event. At the household level, a disaster could result in a major illness, death, or a substantial economic or social misfortune. At the community level, it could be a flood, a fire, a collapse of buildings in an earthquake, the destruction of livelihoods, an epidemic or displacement through conflict. When occurring at the district or provincial level, a large number of people can be affected."

A recent case study of a disaster response undertaken by the IFRC can be viewed here.

The level of disaster response depends on a number of factors and particular situation awareness. Studies undertaken by Son, Aziz and Peña-Mora (2007) shows that "initial work demand gradually spreads and increases based on a wide range of variables including scale of disaster, vulnerability of affected area which in turn is affected by population density, site-specific conditions (e.g. exposure to hazardous conditions) and effects of cascading disasters resulting from inter-dependence between elements of critical infrastructure".

In the British Government's Emergency Response and Recovery guidance, disaster response refers to decisions and actions taken in accordance with the strategic, tactical and operational objectives defined by emergency responders. At a high level these will be to protect life, contain and mitigate the impacts of the emergency and create the conditions for a return to normality. Response encompasses the decisions and actions taken to deal with the immediate effects of an emergency. In many scenarios it is likely to be relatively short and to last for a matter of hours or days—rapid implementation of arrangements for collaboration, co-ordination and communication are, therefore, vital. Response encompasses the effort to deal not only with the direct effects of the emergency itself (e.g. fighting fires, rescuing individuals) but also the indirect effects (e.g. disruption, media interest).

Common objectives for responders are:

- saving and protecting human life;
- relieving suffering;
- containing the emergency – limiting its escalation or spread and mitigating its impacts;
- providing the public and businesses with warnings, advice and information;
- protecting the health and safety of responding personnel;
- safeguarding the environment;
- as far as reasonably practicable, protecting property;
- maintaining or restoring critical activities;
- maintaining normal services at an appropriate level;
- promoting and facilitating self-help in affected communities;
- facilitating investigations and inquiries (e.g. by preserving the scene and effective records management);
- facilitating the recovery of the community (including the humanitarian assistance, economic, infrastructure and environmental impacts);
- evaluating the response and recovery effort; and
- identifying and taking action to implement the lessons identified.

== Disaster response planning ==
The United States National Fire Protection Association (NFPA) 1600 Standard (NFPA, 2010) specify elements of an emergency response, as: defined responsibilities; specific actions to be taken (which must include protective actions for life safety); and communication directives. Within the standard, NFPA recognize that disasters and day-to-day emergencies are characteristically different. Nevertheless, the prescribed response elements are the same.

In support of the NFPA standard, Statoil's (2013) practical application of emergency response is across three distinct "lines" that incorporate NFPA's elements. Line 1 is responsible for the operational management of an incident; line 2, typically housed off-site, is responsible for tactical guidance and additional resource management. Finally, in the case of major incidents, line 3 provides strategic guidance, group resource management, and government and media relations.

While it is impossible to plan for every disaster, crisis or emergency, the Statoil investigation into the terrorist attacks on In Amenas place emphasis on the importance of having a disaster response. The report concludes that a disaster response framework may be utilized in an array of disaster situations, such as that at In Amenas.

Disaster risk reduction (DRR) is action taken to "[reduce] existing disaster risk and [manage] residual risk." DRR plans aim to decrease the amount of disaster response necessary by planning ahead and making communities resilient to any potential hazardous events that might occur. A number of international frameworks such as the Sendai Framework for Disaster Risk Reduction have been enacted to increase the implementation of global mitigation plans in the event of disasters.

== Organizations ==
=== United Nations ===
The United Nations Office for the Coordination of Humanitarian Affairs (OCHA); is responsible for bringing together humanitarian actors to ensure a coherent response to emergencies that require an international response. OCHA plays a key role in operational coordination in crisis situations. This includes assessing situations and needs; agreeing common priorities; developing common strategies to address issues such as negotiating access, mobilizing funding and other resources; clarifying consistent public messaging; and monitoring progress.

=== United Kingdom ===
The organisation in the United Kingdom for the provision of communications disaster response is RAYNET. The UK organisation for the provision of disaster response by off-road vehicles is 4x4 Response.

=== European Union ===
In addition to providing funding to humanitarian aid, the European Commission's Directorate-General for European Civil Protection and Humanitarian Aid Operations (DG-ECHO) is in charge of the EU Civil Protection Mechanism to coordinate the response to disasters in Europe and beyond and contributes to at least 75% of the transport and/or operational costs of deployments. Established in 2001, the Mechanism fosters cooperation among national civil protection authorities across Europe. Currently 34 countries are members of the Mechanism; all 27 EU Member States in addition to Iceland, Norway, Serbia, North Macedonia, Montenegro, Turkey and Bosnia and Herzegovina. The Mechanism was set up to enable coordinated assistance from the participating states to victims of natural and man-made disasters in Europe and elsewhere.

=== Canada ===
In Canada, GlobalMedic was established in 1998 as a non-sectarian humanitarian-aid NGO to provide disaster relief services to large scale catastrophes around the world. Time magazine recognized the work of GlobalMedic in its 2010 Time 100 issue. It has a roster of over 1,000 volunteers from across Canada that includes professional rescuers, police officers, firefighters and paramedics who donate their time to respond to international disasters. Their personnel are divided into Rapid Response Teams (RRTs) that operate rescue units, Water Purification Units (WPUs) designed to provide safe drinking water; and Emergency Medical Units (EMUs) that use inflatable field hospitals to provide emergency medical treatment. Since 2004, GlobalMedic teams have deployed to over 60 humanitarian disasters around the world.

=== India ===
In India, the National Disaster Management Authority is responsible for planning for mitigating effects of natural disasters and anticipating and avoiding man-made disasters. It also coordinates the capacity-building and response of government agencies in the time of crises and emergencies. The National Disaster Response Force is an inter-government disaster response agency that specializes in search, rescue and rehabilitation.

=== United States of America ===
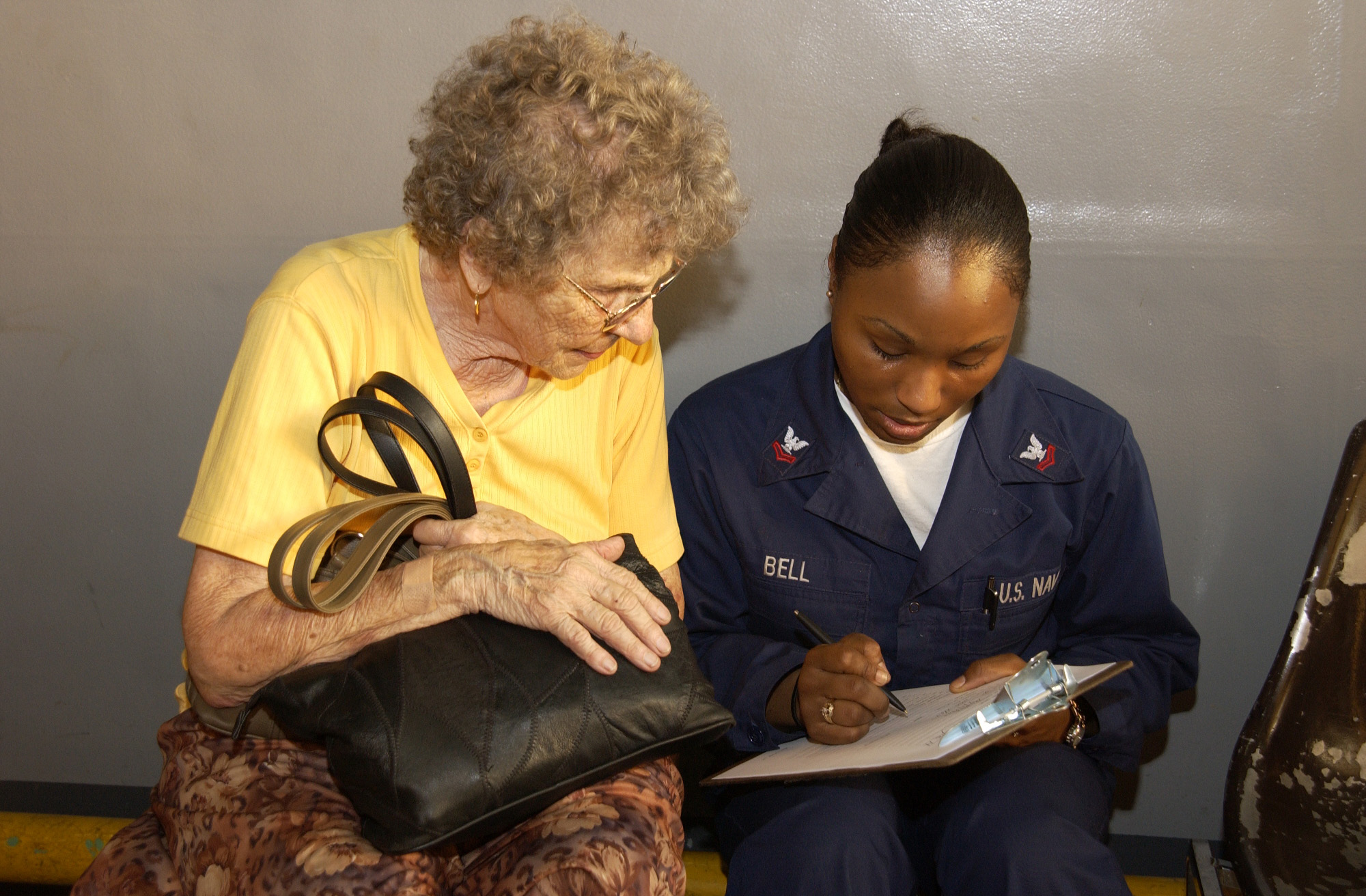
US Navy sailor helps a Hurricane Katrina victim fill out paperwork after she was transported the dock landing ship USS Tortuga.

In the US, the Federal Emergency Management Agency coordinates federal operational and logistical disaster response capability needed to save and sustain lives, minimize suffering, and protect property in a timely and effective manner in communities that become overwhelmed by disasters. The Centers for Disease Control and Prevention offer information for specific types of emergencies, such as disease outbreaks, natural disasters and severe weather, as well as chemical and radiation accidents. Also, the Emergency Preparedness and Response Program of the National Institute for Occupational Safety and Health develops resources to address responder safety and health during responder and recovery operations.

Among volunteers, the American Red Cross is chartered by Congress in 1900 to lead and coordinate non-profit efforts. They are supported by disaster relief organizations from many religious denominations and community service agencies. Licensed amateur radio operators support most volunteer organizations, and are often affiliated with the American Radio Relay League (ARRL).

=== Disaster response organizations ===
In addition to the response by the government, a great deal of assistance in the wake of any disaster comes from charities, disaster response and non-governmental organizations. The biggest international umbrella organizations are the Inter-Agency Standing Committee and the International Council for Voluntary Agencies.

Humanitarian OSM Team works to update and provide map in areas struck by disaster.

== Disaster response technologies ==
=== Ad hoc infrastructure ===
A range of infrastructures could be restored ad hoc quickly after a disaster using technologies.

==== Communications ====
The Government Emergency Telecommunications Service supports federal, state, local and tribal government personnel, industry and non-governmental organizations during a crisis or emergency by providing emergency access and priority handling for local and long-distance calls over the public switched telephone network. There is a Nationwide Wireless Priority Service that allows a user to wait for cellular bandwidth to open.

Wireless mesh networks can be deployed rapidly to enable Internet connectivity, substitute failed mobile phone networks and emergency- and post-disaster communication – including for disaster response coordination and emergency calls. Mesh networks such as B.A.T.M.A.N. are often developed and deployed open-source by volunteer communities with little resources.

==== Electricity ====
Emergency power systems – such as mobile microgeneration units, mobile charging- and power supply-stations or specially designed or extended smart grids – could support important electrical systems on loss of normal power supply or restore power supply for small regions whose connections to the main power grid were cut off.

==== Transportation ====
The transportation infrastructure may have become unpassable due to a disaster, complicating logistics, evacuation and disaster response.

Technologies may allow for quick ad hoc sufficient restoration of the transportation network or substitutions of parts of it. Such include the rapid construction of stable bridges based on mobile lightweight and/or locally sourced materials or components, which militaries have been involved in.

==== Waste management ====
Disaster waste is often managed in an ad hoc manner. The waste generated by a disaster can overwhelm existing solid waste management facilities and affect other response activities. Depending on the type of disaster, its scope and recovery duration conventional waste may need to be managed in similar ways and both may be associated with the transportation network restoration.

==== Emergency accommodation ====
Emergency accommodation is sometimes considered to be an element of infrastructure. Temporary accommodation for people and animals after disasters is an issue. Sometimes existing private accommodation infrastructure and logistics are repurposed for the disaster response.

==== Water supply ====
Water supply, drainage and sewerage infrastructure, and the functioning of wastewater treatment plants may be disrupted by disasters.

==== Vaccination infrastructure ====
Long-term disaster response, as well as medical infrastructure local to disaster regions with increased health risk, may include vaccination infrastructure.

=== Response coordination websites ===
Volunteers, as well as other people involved in a disaster response such as locals and civil organizations like the Technische Hilfswerk, can be coordinated and coordinate with the help of websites and similar ICTs such as for preventing traffic jams, "disaster tourists" and other obstruction of the transportation network, for allocating different forms of help to locations in need, reporting missing persons and increasing efficiency. Such websites for specific individual affected regions have been set up after the 2021 European floods.

=== Emergency response systems ===
Smart Emergency Response System (SERS) prototype was built in the SmartAmerica Challenge 2013–2014, a United States government initiative. SERS has been created by a team of nine organizations led by MathWorks. The project was featured at the White House in June 2014 and described by Todd Park (U.S. Chief Technology Officer) as an exemplary achievement.

The SmartAmerica initiative challenges the participants to build cyber-physical systems as a glimpse of the future to save lives, create jobs, foster businesses, and improve the economy. SERS primarily saves lives. The system provides the survivors and the emergency personnel with information to locate and assist each other during a disaster. SERS allows to submit help requests to a MATLAB-based mission center connecting first responders, apps, search-and-rescue dogs, a 6-feet-tall humanoid, robots, drones, and autonomous aircraft and ground vehicles. The command and control center optimizes the available resources to serve every incoming requests and generates an action plan for the mission. The Wi-Fi network is created on the fly by the drones equipped with antennas. In addition, the autonomous rotorcrafts, planes, and ground vehicles are simulated with Simulink and visualized in a 3D environment (Google Earth) to unlock the ability to observe the operations on a mass scale.

The International Charter Space and Major Disasters provides for the charitable retasking of satellite assets, providing coverage from 15 space agencies, etc. which is wide albeit contingent. It focuses on the beginning of the disaster cycle, when timely data is of the essence.

Digital technologies are increasingly being used in humanitarian action, they have shown to improve the health and recovery of populations affected by both natural and man-made disasters. They are used in humanitarian response to facilitate and coordinate aid in various stages including preparedness, response, and recovery from emergencies. More specifically, mobile health (mHealth), which is defined as the use of communication devices such as mobile phones for the purpose of health services information. Nowadays, millions of people use mobile phones as a means of daily communication and data transference, out of which 64% live in developing countries. One of the most important characteristics of disasters are the harms caused to infrastructures, accessibility issues, and an exponential need of medical and emergency services. In such situations, the use of mobile phones for mHealth can be vital, especially when other communication infrastructures are hindered. In such conditions, the abundance of mobile technology in developing countries provide the opportunity to be harnessed for helping victims and vulnerable people.

Mobile health information technology platforms, in the acute phase of disaster response, create a common operational framework that improves disaster response by standardizing data acquisition, organizing information storage, and facilitating communication among medical staff. One of the challenges in disaster response is the need of pertinent, effective and continuous analysis of the situation and information in order to evaluate needs and resources. mHealth has been shown to provide effective disaster preparedness with real time collection of medical data as well as helping identify and create needs assessments during disasters. Using mobile technology in heath has set the stage for the dynamic organization of medical resources and promotion of patient care done through quick triage, patient tracking, and documentation storage and maintenance.

Managing an effective and influential response requires cooperation, which is also facilitated through mHealth. A retrospective study demonstrated that applying mHealth can lead to up to 15% decrease of unnecessary hospital transfers during disasters. In addition, they provide field hospital administrators with real-time census information essential for planning, resource allocation, inter-facility patient transfers, and inter-agency collaboration. mHealth technology systems can improve post-operative care and patient handoffs between volunteer providers. Data entry with mobile devices is now widely used to facilitate the registration of displaced individuals, to conduct surveys, identify those in need of assistance, and to capture data on issues such as food security, vaccination rates, and mortality.

Above all, mHealth can harness the power of information to improve patient outcomes. Efforts led by the Harvard Humanitarian Initiative and Operational Medicine Institute during the Haiti earthquake resulted in the creation of a web-based mHealth system that created a patient log of 617 unique entries used by on-the-ground medical providers and field hospital administrators. This helped facilitate provider triage, improve provider handoffs, and track vulnerable populations such as unaccompanied minors, pregnant women, traumatic orthopedic injuries and specified infectious diseases. Also, during the Haiti earthquake, the International Red Crescent sent more than 45 million SMSs to Viole mobile phone users. This resulted in 95% of the receiver reporting they had gained useful information, and out of these 90% reported the SMS helped in their preparedness.

== Problematic individual and collective responses ==
Previous experiences with false alarms cause some people to ignore legitimate danger signals, such as a fire alarm.

Amanda Ripley points out that (contrary to many portrayals in movies) among the general public in fires and large-scale disasters, there is a remarkable lack of panic and sometimes dangerous denial of, lack of reaction to, or rationalization of warning signs that should be obvious. She says that this is often attributed to local or national character, but appears to be universal, and is typically followed by consultations with nearby people when the signals finally get enough attention. Empirical studies have similarly found that protective behavior during disasters is strongly influenced by perceived risk, social networks, self-efficacy, and practical barriers to action rather than hazard exposure alone. Disaster survivors advocate training everyone to recognize warning signs and practice responding.

A study published in 2020 showed that social networks can function poorly as pathways for inconvenient truths that people would rather ignore and that the interplay between communication and action may depend on the structure of social networks. It also showed that communication networks suppress necessary "evacuations" in test-scenarios because of spontaneous and diffuse emergence of false reassurance when compared to groups of isolated individuals and that larger networks with a smaller proportion of informed subjects suffered more damage due to human-caused misinformation. Following disaster, collective processing of emotions leads to greater resilience and community engagement.

== Impacts of disasters ==
=== On men and women ===
In the immediate aftermath of a disaster, an affected population has a number of needs. In disaster response relief, many actors tend to focus on addressing the most immediate needs first. For example, the United Nations Office for the Coordination of Humanitarian Affairs (OCHA) emphasizes that:

response efforts will focus on the immediate provision of quality life-saving humanitarian supplies, including ready-to-eat rations and food baskets, basic relief items for the most vulnerable households, including light hygiene and dignity kits, and a series of initial – and largely mobile - emergency protection interventions. Delivery of basic services will be supported through the reinforcement of available service providers relating to sectors including health, WASH, shelter, protection and education in the areas hosting those newly displaced.

These priorities are more than just addressing basic needs, as they represent shared needs between men and women. Consequently, addressing these needs first, helps disaster relief responses to reach as many people as possible. While meeting these gender inclusive needs are critical, men and women also have different needs which must be addressed. Specifically, there are biological differences between men and women, which create different needs. For instance, the needs of women in a post-disaster context can include; having access to menstrual products, having access to a secure toilet (as going to a non secure toilet can leave women more vulnerable to the potential for rape or sexual assault) and having critical pre or post natal services, to name a few. These areas are also immediate needs that need to be addressed in post-disaster relief responses. Beyond women's immediate needs, women can face long-term income disparities as a result of disasters.

=== On women ===
Women's income is disproportionately impacted by disasters. A study undertaken by Le Masson et al. in 2016, found that following Hurricane Katrina in 2005, "the ratio of women's to men's earnings in New Orleans declined from 81.6% prior to the disaster to 61.8% in 2006". Underlying this disproportionate impact are gendered vulnerabilities. One notable gendered vulnerability is the double burden. The double burden is the combination of paid and unpaid work. One of the key forms of unpaid labor is care labor. Care labor (also referred to as social reproduction) encompasses, "tasks of providing for dependants, for children, the sick, the elderly and all the rest of us". This double burden exacerbates the unequal impact that disasters have on women. Lafrenière, Sweetman and Thylin emphasize that "women operate as unpaid carers keeping societies and economies functioning ... Poverty and crisis make this unpaid work even more critical for survival. This makes it imperative for humanitarian responders to understand the scope and extent of this unpaid care work and to work with women carers". Another critical underlying gendered vulnerability is unequal access to economic resources. Globally, "women have less access to livelihoods assets (such as financial accounts) and opportunities than men". In times of disaster, the lack of access to sufficient financial resources can "force [women] to turn to risky behaviour such as prostitution or transactional sex as a means of survival. Crises also tend to increase the burdens of care and household responsibilities for women, making their ability to economically support themselves and their dependents more difficult".

== See also ==
- Civil protection
- Emergency management
- Hurricane response

== Bibliography ==
- Ripley, Amanda (2009). The Unthinkable: Who Survives when Disaster Strikes - and Why. New York: Arrow Books. ISBN 978-0-09-952572-1. OCLC 972068736.
- Son, Jeongwook; Aziz, Zeeshan; Feniosky Peña-Mora. Structural Survey Archived 3 July 2014 at the Wayback Machine, 2007, Vol. 26, Iss. 5. pp. 411–425.
- NFPA (2010) Standard on Disaster/Emergency Management and Business Continuity Programs. 2010 Edition. NFPA
- Statoil (2013) The In Amenas Attack: Report of the investigation into the terrorist attack on In Amenas. Prepared for Statoil ASA's board of directors. Statoil ASA
