= Canada Ukraine Surgical Aid Program =

- Canada-Ukraine Surgical Assistance Program
- Abbreviation: CUSAP
- Formation: 2014; 12 years ago
- Legal status: Active
- Purpose: Provide surgical assistance and medical support
- Headquarters: Poland
- Location: Ukraine (2014–2022), Poland (since February 2022)
- Website: Official website

The Canada Ukraine Surgical Aid Program or CUSAP is a mission of Canadian doctors led by Oleh Antonyshyn, a Canadian plastic surgeon of Ukrainian descent. Initiated by the Canada-Ukraine Foundation in 2014 following the Revolution of Dignity, CUSAP's volunteer doctors provide free treatment to patients, while the Canada-Ukraine Foundation covers operating costs.

From 2014 to 2022, the mission was based in Kyiv. In 2022, with the beginning of the Russian full-scale invasion, the surgical assistance program was relocated to the hospital in Czeładz, Poland.

== History ==
In April 2014, after the shootings on the Maidan, a Ukrainian-American physician, activist, and philanthropist Ulana Suprun, who served as Director of Humanitarian Initiatives for the Ukrainian World Congress, appealed to the Canada-Ukraine Foundation for medical assistance to Ukrainians wounded during the Revolution of Dignity.

In March 2014, to assess the state of affairs and the possibilities of medical assistance, the Canada-Ukraine Foundation organized a trip of several representatives of the organization who had medical specialization, including Antonyshyn, a plastic surgeon at Toronto's Sunnybrook Health Sciences Centre, professor in the Department of Plastic, Reconstructive, and Aesthetic Surgery at the University of Toronto, and a member of the Canadian Ukrainian diaspora.

The delegation visited several hospitals in Kyiv where Ukrainians with severe injuries were treated and also visited hospitals in Donetsk. After visiting at least 20 hospitals all over Ukraine, Oleh Antonyshyn and the leadership of the Canada-Ukraine Foundation established the Canada Ukraine Medical missions. After eight years, it was renamed to the Canada Ukraine Surgical Aid Program (CUSAP).

In November of the same year, at the invitation of Antonyshyn, 25 volunteer surgeons, anesthesiologists, and nurses arrived in Ukraine from Canada to carry out a mission to treat patients who were injured during the Revolution of Dignity and those who were wounded in Eastern Ukraine. The medical team was assembled across Canada, including Victoria, Vancouver, Edmonton, Winnipeg and Toronto. More than 60 patients from Ukraine with complex post-traumatic conditions and distortions were consulted. A total of 37 reconstructive surgeries were performed on 30 patients.

== Activities ==
Between 2014 and 2020, Antonyshyn and the surgical aid team conducted five missions. During each mission, they treated about 40 patients, and by the fifth mission, the medical team was regularly consulting 100 patients.

From 2014 to 2020, the Canadian Mission of Plastic Surgeons was based in Kyiv, and Canadian doctors also performed on-site surgeries in Lviv and Odesa. Over the years of the mission's work in Ukraine, the Canada-Ukraine Foundation has contributed almost 2 million Canadian dollars to Ukrainian hospitals.

In 2016, Antonyshyn was awarded the State Award "For Merit" of the III Degree by Presidential Decree.

In 2017, Antonyshyn received the M. Ochrymovych Humanitarian Award, also known as the Helping Hands Humanitarian Award, from the Ukrainian Canadian Social Services Toronto (UCSST) organization.

=== Activities since 2022 ===
With the outbreak of Russia's full-scale war against Ukraine, the Canada Ukraine Surgical Aid Program relocated to Poland. Operating rooms were set aside in the hospital in Czeładź, where volunteer doctors from Canada provide orthopedic and plastic surgery to seriously wounded military and civilians, who have suffered mine-blast injuries. Ukrainian surgeons are also involved in the postoperative care and recovery of the victims.

In 2022, Polish Prime Minister Mateusz Morawiecki visited the hospital in Czeładź to thank Canadian doctors who operate on seriously wounded war veterans and civilian Ukrainians.

=== Volunteer doctors ===
At the beginning of the large-scale invasion, the CUSAP team received more than 120 applications from doctors of various specialties from across North America who wanted to treat Ukrainian patients on a volunteer basis. One of the mission participants is Steve McCabe, who, together with his team, was the first in the world to perform an arm transplant. The doctor has been participating in CUSAP missions since 2014.

For some facial reconstructions, plastic surgeons use patients' bones from other parts of the body, or artificial implants printed on a 3D printer.

Operations are performed with the participation of medical specialists from various fields, including maxillofacial surgeons and neurosurgeons, which has a multidisciplinary approach to treatment.

According to Polish law, foreign doctors are prohibited from treating patients in the country without first confirming their qualifications. The Polish government and the Polish Ministry of Health simplified this procedure for CUSAP doctors and issued a 3-week authorization for Canadian doctors to treat patients.

=== Funding ===
On September 11, 2014, the Ukrainian Canadian community in Toronto hosted a charity event, "Unite for Ukraine", to raise funds for the first mission of plastic surgeons to Ukraine. The event was sponsored by Canadian businessman Eugene Melnyk, the Canadian entrepreneur and proprietor of the NHL's Ottawa Senators. The gathering included the attendance of then Prime Minister Stephen Harper, renowned hockey figure Wayne Gretzky, and other notable attendees. The evening raised over 200,000 Canadian dollars. Other donors included representatives of the Canada-Ukraine Foundation, Canadian corporations, and other institutions, which allocated CAD 500,000 for the second and third missions.

CUSAP's last four missions were funded by donor support raised via the Ukraine Humanitarian Appeal, established in 2022 as a joint initiative of the Ukrainian Canadian Congress (UCC) and the Canada-Ukraine Foundation (CUF).

The Canada Ukraine Surgical Aid Program is also supported by the Ministry of Health of Ukraine, the Ministry of Defense of Ukraine, and the Ministry of Health of Poland. Also, in 2023, Sunnybrook Health Sciences Centre, in collaboration with the Canada-Ukraine Foundation, launched an educational initiative for Ukrainian surgeons. This program aims to improve patient care in Ukraine through joint training and exchange of experience. During each mission, 15-20 Ukrainian doctors are trained in craniofacial surgery.
