= NJT (disambiguation) =

NJT, or NJ Transit is the transportation system of New Jersey.

NJT may also refer to:

- Nagercoil Town railway station, Tamil Nadu, India (Southern Railways code)
- National Jewish Television, a TV channel in United States
- Ndyuka-Tiriyó Pidgin (ISO 639-3 code)
- Not Just Tourists, an organization in Canada
