= CUF =

CUF may refer to:

- Centre Party Youth, Centerpartiets Ungdomsförbund, the youth organization of the Center Party in Sweden
- Center for Union Facts, an advocacy group critical of unions
- Civic United Front, a political party in Tanzania
- Companhia União Fabril, a Portuguese company
- Grupo Desportivo Fabril do Barreiro, formerly the Grupo Desportivo da Companhia União Fabril, a Portuguese football (soccer) team
- CUF, Cincinnati, Ohio, a neighborhood in Cincinnati, Ohio
- The IATA airport code for Cuneo Levaldigi Airport, in Piedmont, Italy
- Cursor Forward (ANSI), an ANSI X3.64 escape sequence
- Care Under Fire
- Canada-Ukraine Foundation
