= Joshua Macabuag =

Civil engineer

Joshua Macabuag OBE
- Engineering career
- Discipline: Civil Engineering; Disaster response
- Awards: FREng

Joshua Macabuag OBE is a civil engineer, who specialises in disaster response.

== Early life and education ==
Macabuag studied civil engineering at the University of Oxford. Following his graduation, he worked on a project in South Africa with the charity Engineers Without Borders.

== Career ==
In 2009, Macabuag notably won first prize at the ICE's Graduate and Student Papers competition, for his paper investigating the use of polypropylene straps to earthquake-proof buildings in the country of Nepal.

His expertise in disaster response has led him to provide expertise during a number of major global disasters, including the April 2015 Nepal earthquake, Hurricane Irma and others. In 2018, Macabuag published a study in Geosciences into the effect of debris-induced damage in buildings. Macabuag has also published other studies into modelling vulnerabilities during natural disasters.

In 2021, Macabuag partnered with the World Bank to work as a disaster risk engineering consultant. Macabuag was a keynote speaker at the 14th Brunel International Lecture series, where he discussed disaster response. In 2023, he became a Royal Academy of Engineering Fellow.

In 2025, Macabuag was made an Officer of the Order of the British Empire (OBE) in the Kings Birthday Honours List for services to disaster search and rescue engineering.
