= Canada-Ukraine Foundation =

Charitable organization

- Formation: August 28, 1995; 30 years ago
- Type: Non-governmental organization
- Legal status: Not-for-Profit organization, National Charity
- Website: https://www.cufoundation.ca/

Canada-Ukraine Foundation (CUF) is a national charitable organization established in 1995. The CUF coordinates, develops, organizes, and implements aid projects created by Canadians and sent to Ukraine and other projects in Canada.

== History ==
=== 1994–2014 ===
In June 1994, the Ukrainian Canadian Congress (UCC) decided to establish the Canada-Ukraine Foundation (CUF). The creation of the CUF was declared on the occasion of Ukraine's President Leonid Kuchma's official visit to Canada in late 1994. CUF was officially established on August 28, 1995.

In 2000-2007 CUF supported various minor initiatives such as assisting youth, students, etc.

With increased funding since 2008 (funds raised through donations, membership fees, and government grants), CUF was able to undertake more substantial projects such as Dzherelo Rehabilitation Centre (children and youth with special needs), Covid Relief and others. In 2010, during the second round of Ukraine's presidential election, the Canada-Ukraine Foundation and the UCC initiated a mission of 65 observers to overlook election process in Ukraine's oblasts during the first voting round. During the second voting round, CUF prepared additional 50 observers to six areas.

=== 2014–2021 ===
==== Development of rural medicine in Ukraine ====
The Canada-Ukraine Foundation (CUF) has been providing support to Ukraine in the medical field since 2014. With CUF's assistance, Ukrainian doctors attended a conference from January 19 to 21, 2018, in Banff, Alberta. During the event, they had the opportunity to observe local hospitals and emergency services in action. CUF acted as the exclusive sponsor and coordinator for this project, handling everything from securing Canadian visas and travel logistics to facilitating the visit itself.

==== Dental Mission ====
CUF's Ukrainian dental program helped 427 orphans through 448 appointments, providing 720 fillings and more, with 47 Ukrainian professionals and volunteers involved.

==== Medical Missions In Kyiv ====
The Canadian government, through the Global Peace and Security Fund (GPSF), funded two missions in 2015–2016 at the Central Military Hospital Clinic in Kyiv (CMHCK). These missions primarily aimed to offer consultations and surgical reconstruction for patients suffering from complex traumatic defects.

During the first surgical mission, 21 Canadian medical professionals took part, consulting with 90 patients suffering from war traumas and performing 93 surgical procedures on 38 patients. In the second surgical mission, another group of 21 Canadian medical professionals participated, consulting with 105 patients with war traumas and completing 61 surgical procedures on 40 patients.

==== Holodomor National Awareness Tour “Mobile Classroom” ====
The Holodomor National Awareness Tour “Mobile Classroom” was introduced to educate Canadian citizens about the great famine in Ukraine engineered by Joseph Stalin in 1932–33.

In May 2022, the Hamilton Helps Ukraine charity event featured the documentary "Hunger for Truth: The Rhea Clyman Story." This film was produced as a component of the Holodomor National Awareness Tour.

==== Ukraine Prosthetic Assistance Project ====
In 2015, prosthetic care specialists from various Ukrainian cities, including Kyiv, Dnipropetrovsk, Odesa, Kharkiv, Khmelnytsky, and Lviv, received training from volunteer professionals hailing from the United States and Canada.

==== Psychological Support Of Ukrainian Veterans ====
In June 2018, the Ukrainian Canadian Congress and the Canada-Ukraine Foundation announced the grant recipients of the Defenders of Ukraine Fund. The fund allocated a total of $100,000 to four projects, all aimed at the rehabilitation and support of Ukraine's wounded soldiers and veterans.

==== Other initiatives ====
Between 2014 and 2018, the Canada-Ukraine Foundation (CUF) executed 114 projects in both Canada and Ukraine. Throughout this five-year period, CUF successfully raised over 9.6 million Canadian dollars, with 4.9 million dollars contributed by both provincial and federal governments.

CUF supports a project that clears agricultural lands in Eastern Ukraine of mines for local citizens, contributing to the "Let's Clean Donbas Together" project led by the Ukrainian Deminers Association (UDA).

=== 2022-2023. Full-scale Russian invasion ===
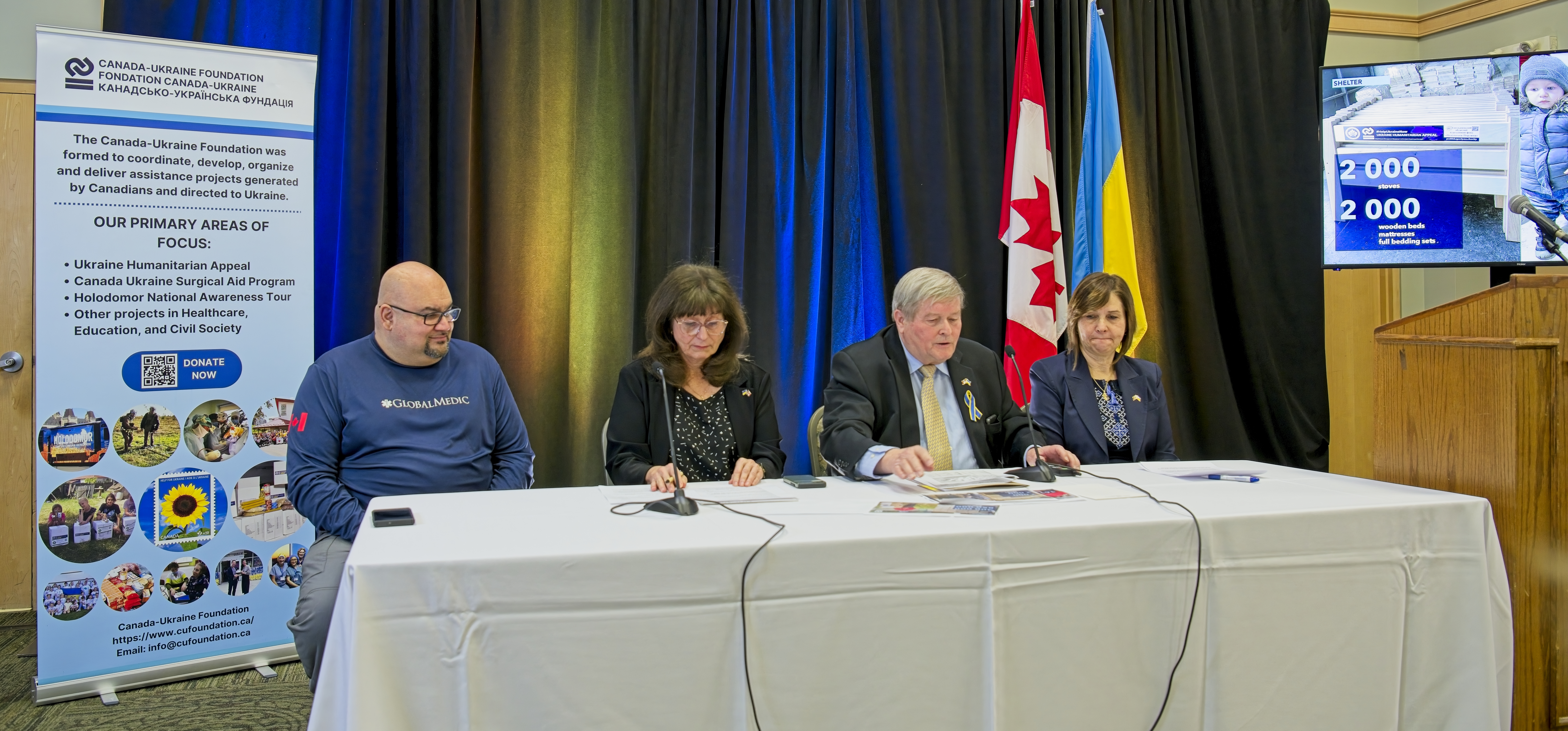
Head of the GlobalMedic Rahul Singh along with Alexandra Chycziy (UCC), Victor Hetmanczuk (CUF) and Oksana Kuzyshyn (KUF) reporting about CUF's help for Ukraine, 2023

Since January 2022, CUF and UCC have been preparing for the Russian invasion, assembling a board of directors and creating the Ukraine Humanitarian Appeal platform. They have worked jointly to enhance the efficiency and cost-effectiveness of aid provided by Canadians to war-affected Ukrainians. CUF's Humanitarian Appeal has gathered over $52 million from over 70000 donors since February 24, 2022.

==== Key projects ====
===== Canada-Ukraine Surgical Aid Program (CUSAP) =====
Dr. Antonyshyn has offered medical care in Ukraine since the 2014 Maidan Revolution. The main CUSAP base, established in September 2022, is in a Polish hospital in Czeladź, where Dr. Antonyshyn has gathered volunteer doctors to treat patients with severe facial injuries. CUF has completed nine medical missions under his leadership, delivering over $2 million worth of medical equipment since 2014.

===== Winterization projects: 161 generators and 2 000 stoves for Ukraine =====
In February 2023, 161 generators purchased through Canadian donations arrived in Ukraine. CUF bought 50 generators for the Ministry of Energy and 60 for Ukrainian hospitals. CUF has also collaborated with two Ukrainian cast-iron stove manufacturers, resulting in 2,000 stoves being ordered.

===== Food boxes =====
Since February 2022, the Humanitarian Appeal has delivered 300,000 food parcels, feeding over 800,000 people in Ukraine, Romania, and Moldova. CUF, in partnership with Global Medic, has distributed over 90,690 kits in Moldova and sent 650 more to Ukraine.

===== Medicine =====
CUF has sent 53 tons of medicine to over 790,000 patients and participated in a humanitarian project from November 2022 to February 2023 to develop a national disaster medicine system, donating new Toyota Land Cruiser J78-based ambulances.

===== Other initiatives =====
In March 2022, the Royal Canadian Mint donated all proceeds from selling four collectible coins to the Ukraine Humanitarian Appeal, a joint initiative by CUF and UCC.

In August 2022, CUF, First Lady Olena Zelenska, and logistics company Meest delivered over 30,000 kg of humanitarian food to de-occupied territories.

In January 2023, the Ukrainian national student hockey team donated a portion of the Hockey Can't Stop Tour proceeds to charities, including the Canada-Ukraine Foundation.

In March 2023, CUF, the Ukraine Humanitarian Appeal, and Global Medic delivered new, advanced protective gear to fire stations in four Ukrainian regions.
