= Essential service (telecommunications) =

In telecommunications, an essential service (critical service) is a network-provided service feature in which a priority dial tone is furnished. Essential service is typically provided to fewer than 10% of network users, and recommended for use in conjunction with NS/EP telecommunications services.
