= NS/EP telecommunications =

Telecommunications system in USA

NS/EP telecommunications is an abbreviation for National Security or Emergency Preparedness telecommunications of the United States. Telecommunications services that are used to maintain a state of readiness or to respond to and manage any event or crisis (local, national, or international) that causes or could cause injury or harm to the population, damage to or loss of property, or degrade or threaten the national security or emergency preparedness posture of the United States.

NS/EP telecommunications are managed and controlled by the National Communications System using Telecommunications Service Priority through both the Government Emergency Telecommunications Service and Wireless Priority Service.
