= Telecommunications Service Priority =

Telecommunications Service Priority (TSP) is a United States program that authorizes national security and emergency preparedness organizations to receive priority treatment for vital voice and data circuits or other telecommunications services. As a result of hurricanes, floods, earthquakes, and other natural or man-made disasters, telecommunications service vendors frequently experience a surge in requests for new services and requirements to restore existing services. The TSP Program provides service vendors a Federal Communications Commission (FCC) mandate to prioritize requests by identifying those services critical to national security and emergency preparedness. A TSP assignment ensures that it will receive priority attention by the service vendor before any non-TSP service.

== Overview ==
Four broad categories serve as guidelines for determining whether a circuit or telecommunications service is eligible for priority provisioning or restoration. TSP service user organizations may be in the Federal, State, local, or tribal government, critical infrastructure sectors in industry, non-profit organizations that perform critical National Security and Emergency Preparedness (NS/EP) functions, or foreign governments. Typical TSP service users are responsible for the command and control functions critical to management of and response to NS/EP situations, particularly during the first 24 to 72 hours following an event

Federal, state, tribal, and local police departments, fire departments, EMS units, and similar entities qualify for Level 3 under communication services necessary for the public health, safety, and maintenance of law and order. The higher priority levels, Levels 1 and 2, include National Security leadership and certain military communications lines. Very few circuits receive a TSP priority Level 1 or Level 2 assignment. If an organization does not enroll its circuits in the TSP program, its telecommunications service provider cannot restore those lines until it has restored all TSP lines in priority levels 1, 2, 3, 4, and 5.

Enrollment and monthly fees for the TSP program are generally set at the state level by public utility or public service commissions. Typically, one-time enrollment fees are approximately $100, and monthly fees per line average $3. TSP Authorization Codes are only valid for three years. The FCC requires that all users revalidate their requirement for TSP every three years before expiration of the user's TSP Authorization Code(s).

== Priority level ==
Priority level or priority is the level that may be assigned to an NS/EP telecommunications service, which level specifies the order in which provisioning or restoration of the service is to occur relative to other NS/EP or non-NS/EP telecommunications services.

Priority levels authorized are designated (highest to lowest) E, 1, 2, 3, 4, and 5 for provisioning and 1, 2, 3, 4, and 5 for restoration.

== See also ==
- INMOS Transputer
