= 10 Essential Public Health Services =

US public health framework

10 Essential Public Health Services

The 10 Essential Public Health Services (EPHS) serve as a framework to guide the field of public health, describing the activities that public health systems should undertake in all communities in the United States.

The original framework was developed in 1994, and in 2020 a revised framework was released that brought the EPHS up-to-date with current and emerging practice. The field has begun updating and adopting the revised framework making equity at the center of the model. Public health practices recognize that in order to build strong, healthy communities, fair and just access must be established

== Purposes ==
The 10 Essential Public Health Services (EPHS) provide a framework for public health to protect and promote the health of all people in all communities. In recognition of public health's commitment to provide a fair and just opportunity for everyone to achieve optimal health and well-being, the framework now contains an equity statement, centers equity in the graphic, and incorporates equity throughout each Essential Service.

The EPHS are organized according to the "three fundamental purposes of public health" (i.e., the three core functions of public health) — assessment, policy development, and assurance:

=== Assessment ===
- Assess and monitor population health status, factors that influence health, and community needs and assets.
- Investigate, diagnose, and address health problems and hazards affecting the population.

=== Policy development ===
- Communicate effectively to inform and educate people about health, factors that influence it, and how to improve it.
- Strengthen, support, and mobilize communities and partnerships to improve health.
- Create, champion, and implement policies, plans, and laws that impact health.
- Utilize legal and regulatory actions designed to improve and protect the public's health.

=== Assurance ===
- Assure an effective system that enables equitable access to the individual services and care needed to be healthy.
- Build and support a diverse and skilled public health workforce.
- Improve and innovate public health functions through ongoing evaluation, research, and continuous quality improvement.
- Build and maintain a strong organizational infrastructure for public health.

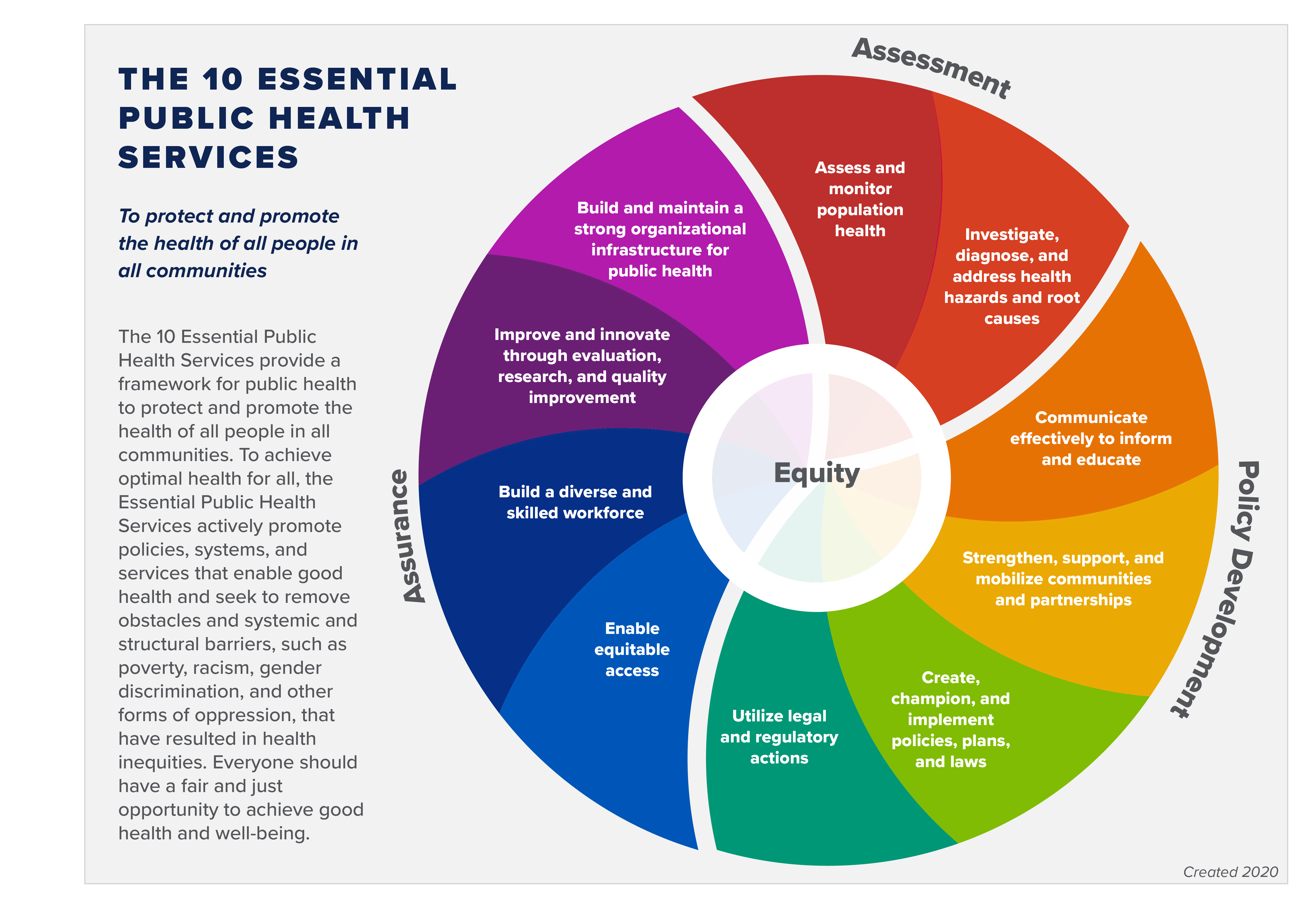
10 Essential Public Health Services (2020)

== List of services ==
The revised framework includes an updated graphic, which includes an equity statement.

Equity Statement: To protect and promote the health of all people in all communities

The 10 Essential Public Health Services provide a framework for public health to protect and promote the health of all people in all communities. To achieve equity, the Essential Public Health Services actively promote policies, systems, and overall community conditions that enable optimal health for all and seek to remove systemic and structural barriers that have resulted in health inequities. Such barriers include poverty, racism, gender discrimination, ableism, and other forms of oppression. Everyone should have a fair and just opportunity to achieve optimal health and well-being.

=== EPHS #1: Assess and monitor population health status, factors that influence health, and community needs and assets ===
This service includes:

- Maintaining an ongoing understanding of health in the jurisdiction by collecting, monitoring, and analyzing data on health and factors that influence health to identify threats, patterns, and emerging issues, with a particular emphasis on disproportionately affected populations
- Using data and information to determine the root causes of health disparities and inequities
- Working with the community to understand health status, needs, assets, key influences, and narrative
- Collaborating and facilitating data sharing with partners, including multisector partners
- Using innovative technologies, data collection methods, and data sets
- Utilizing various methods and technology to interpret and communicate data to diverse audiences
- Analyzing and using disaggregated data (e.g., by race) to track issues and inform equitable action
- Engaging community members as experts and key partners

=== EPHS #2: Investigate, diagnose, and address health problems and hazards affecting the population ===
This service includes:

- Anticipating, preventing, and mitigating emerging health threats through epidemiologic identification
- Monitoring real-time health status and identifying patterns to develop strategies to address chronic diseases and injuries
- Using real-time data to identify and respond to acute outbreaks, emergencies, and other health hazards
- Using public health laboratory capabilities and modern technology to conduct rapid screening and high-volume testing
- Analyzing and utilizing inputs from multiple sectors and sources to consider social, economic, and environmental root causes of health status
- Identifying, analyzing, and distributing information from new, big, and real-time data sources

=== EPHS #3: Communicate effectively to inform and educate people about health, factors that influence it, and how to improve it ===
This service includes:

- Developing and disseminating accessible health information and resources, including through collaboration with multi-sector partners
- Communicating with accuracy and necessary speed
- Using appropriate communications channels (e.g., social media, peer-to-peer networks, mass media, and other channels) to effectively reach the intended populations
- Developing and deploying culturally and linguistically appropriate and relevant communications and educational resources, which includes working with stakeholders and influencers in the community to create effective and culturally resonant materials
- Employing the principles of risk communication, health literacy, and health education to inform the public, when appropriate
- Actively engaging in two-way communication to build trust with populations served and ensure accuracy and effectiveness of prevention and health promotion strategies
- Ensuring public health communications and education efforts are asset based when appropriate and do not reinforce narratives that are damaging to disproportionately affected populations

=== EPHS #4: Strengthen, support, and mobilize communities and partnerships to improve health ===
This service includes:

- Convening and facilitating multisector partnerships and coalitions that include sectors that influence health (e.g., planning, transportation, housing, education, etc.)
- Fostering and building genuine, strengths-based relationships with a diverse group of partners that reflect the community and the population
- Authentically engaging with community members and organizations to develop public health solutions
- Learning from, and supporting, existing community partnerships and contributing public health expertise

=== EPHS #5: Create, champion, and implement policies, plans, and laws that impact health ===
This service includes:

- Developing and championing policies, plans, and laws that guide the practice of public health
- Examining and improving existing policies, plans, and laws to correct historical injustices
- Ensuring that policies, plans, and laws provide a fair and just opportunity for all to achieve optimal health
- Providing input into policies, plans, and laws to ensure that health impact is considered
- Continuously monitoring and developing policies, plans, and laws that improve public health and preparedness and strengthen community resilience
- Collaborating with all partners, including multi-sector partners, to develop and support policies, plans, and laws
- Working across partners and with the community to systematically and continuously develop and implement health improvement strategies and plans, and evaluate and improve those plans

=== EPHS #6: Utilize legal and regulatory actions designed to improve and protect the public's health ===
This service includes:

- Ensuring that applicable laws are equitably applied to protect the public's health
- Conducting enforcement activities that may include, but are not limited to sanitary codes, especially in the food industry; full protection of drinking water supplies; and timely follow-up on hazards, preventable injuries, and exposure-related diseases identified in occupational and community settings
- Licensing and monitoring the quality of healthcare services (e.g., laboratory, nursing homes, and home healthcare)
- Reviewing new drug, biologic, and medical device applications
- Licensing and credentialing the healthcare workforce
- Including health considerations in laws from other sectors (e.g., zoning)

=== EPHS #7: Assure an effective system that enables equitable access to the individual services and care needed to be healthy ===
This service includes:

- Connecting the population to needed health and social services that support the whole person, including preventive services
- Ensuring access to high-quality and cost-effective healthcare and social services, including behavioral and mental health services, that are culturally and linguistically appropriate
- Engaging health delivery systems to assess and address gaps and barriers in accessing needed health services, including behavioral and mental health
- Addressing and removing barriers to care
- Building relationships with payers and healthcare providers, including the sharing of data across partners to foster health and well-being
- Contributing to the development of a competent healthcare workforce

=== EPHS #8: Build and support a diverse and skilled public health workforce ===
This service includes:

- Providing education and training that encompasses a spectrum of public health competencies, including technical, strategic, and leadership skills
- Ensuring that the public health workforce is the appropriate size to meet the public's needs
- Building a culturally competent public health workforce and leadership that reflects the community and practices cultural humility
- Incorporating public health principles in non-public health curricula
- Cultivating and building active partnerships with academia and other professional training programs and schools to assure community-relevant learning experiences for all learners
- Promoting a culture of lifelong learning in public health
- Building a pipeline of future public health practitioners
- Fostering leadership skills at all levels

=== EPHS #9: Improve and innovate public health functions through ongoing evaluation, research, and continuous quality improvement ===
This service includes:

- Building and fostering a culture of quality in public health organizations and activities
- Linking public health research with public health practice
- Using research, evidence, practice based insights, and other forms of information to inform decision-making
- Contributing to the evidence base of effective public health practice
- Evaluating services, policies, plans, and laws continuously to ensure they are contributing to health and not creating undue harm
- Establishing and using engagement and decision-making structures to work with the community in all stages of research
- Valuing and using qualitative, quantitative, and lived experience as data and information to inform decision-making

=== EPHS #10: Build and maintain a strong organizational infrastructure for public health ===
This service includes:

- Developing an understanding of the broader organizational infrastructures and roles that support the entire public health system in a jurisdiction (e.g., government agencies, elected officials, and non-governmental organizations)
- Ensuring that appropriate, needed resources are allocated equitably for the public's health
- Exhibiting effective and ethical leadership, decision-making, and governance
- Managing financial and human resources effectively
- Employing communications and strategic planning capacities and skills
- Having robust information technology services that are current and meet privacy and security standards
- Being accountable, transparent, and inclusive with all partners and the community in all aspects of practice

== History ==
In 1988, the Institute of Medicine (IOM) released an assessment of the U.S. public health system titled, The Future of Public Health. The report described the network of county, state, and national public health agencies as being in "disarray" and prompted a national discussion about the state of public health in the country. Questioning the ability of existing public health systems to provide essential services, the report sought to establish a comprehensive framework delineating the "three fundamental purposes of public health." These purposes included "assessment, policy development, and assurance."

Though health policy academicians identified with and understood the IOM framework, policy makers found its highly conceptual language difficult to apply. Therefore, as part of President Clinton's 1994 healthcare reform efforts, a federal working-group was tasked with reviewing and supplementing the framework. Under the auspices of both the Centers for Disease Control and Prevention's Public Health Practice Program Office and the Office of Disease Prevention and Health Promotion, the group sought to:

1. explain what public health is,
2. clarify the role of public health within the larger healthcare system, and
3. provide accountability by linking public health performance to health outcomes.

These efforts culminated in the publication of The Essential Services of Public Health in late 1994. The report was well received. Public health agencies and professional organizations began to align guidelines and employ self-assessment tools in support of the 10 Essential Services. The CDC launched a number of research projects aimed at developing strategies for measuring how well public health agencies provided the services. Many of these studies were the first of their kind and ushered in an era of health agency monitoring and assessment. Between 1994 and 2020, the 10 EPHS was widely adopted and used as the basis for other frameworks, as demonstrated below.

From spring 2019 to fall 2020, the Public Health National Center for Innovations (PHNCI) partnered with the de Beaumont Foundation to review and revise the 10 Essential Public Health Services (EPHS). The Futures Initiative: the 10 Essential Public Health Services brought the national framework in line with current and future public health practice. This effort, led by a task force of public health experts, engaged the public health community in activities to collect information and build consensus for an updated 10 EPHS framework that reflects current and emerging public health practice needs.

In addition to the task force, a crowd-sourced feedback process was essential to the revision. The broader public health field was engaged at multiple stages of the revision process, including initial feedback and for vetting the draft framework, and in a variety of settings, including live crowdsourcing events, in-person and virtual townhalls, think tank discussions, and open questionnaires. Over 1,350 individuals from health departments (local, state, and territorial), academia/research, non-profits or community-based organizations, federal agencies, and students contributed to the revision process. The first question participants were asked was to determine the public's view on the EPHS framework to determine if the field believed a revision was necessary. Eighty-five percent of respondents indicated that the framework should be kept but revised to some degree.

Changes were made throughout the EPHS to modernize language and update the Essential Services based on current practice. Major changes to the EPHS include adding equity as a central element and a new EPHS #10. EPHS #10 now focuses on the importance of organizational infrastructure. Previous components of EPHS #10 were added to EPHS #9.

The EPHS is and has always been a framework written by the field, for the field. To encourage adoption and implementation of the revised EPHS, a free digital toolkit was created with downloadable graphics, presentations, and more. As of January 2021, the toolkit has received over 21,000 visits. In order to ensure the guide for the public health field reflects existing needs, the de Beaumont Foundation plans to reconvene a task force in five years to determine if revisions are necessary and will continue to support updates as needed.

== The 10 EPHS as the Basis for Other Initiatives ==
The EPHS has been an essential guide for the public health field and beyond for 25 years. In 2002, the CDC and several national public health associations launched the National Public Health Performance Standards Program (NPHPSP). With the goal of developing a consensus-based set of performance standards for state and local public health delivery systems, the NPHPSP adopted the Essential Public Health Services as "the fundamental framework" underpinning its assessment strategy. The NPHPSP consists of three instruments — The State Public Health System Assessment, The Local Public Health System Assessment, and The Local Public Health Governance Assessment — and covers the gamut of public health action as described by the Essential Public Health Services.

In 2005, NACCHO released the Operational Definition of a Functional Local Health Department to define the role of the local governmental public health department in providing each of the EPHS. Understanding that there are factors at the local level that make each local health department unique, the Operational Definition defines what everyone, no matter where they live, can reasonably expect from the local health department.

In the 2003 report The Future of the Public's Health in the 21st Century, the Institute of Medicine recommended the exploration of national accreditation for health departments and encouraged that accreditation build on existing frameworks such as the NPHPSP and the Operational Definition of a Functional Local Health Department. The Exploring Accreditation Project (EAP) recommended a model for the voluntary national accreditation program including 12 domains for accreditation standards, based largely on the EPHS. The EAP Steering Committee made a deliberate decision to use existing efforts (including NPHPSP and the Operational Definition, both of which are based on the EPHS) as the cornerstone for developing the Standards & Measures because they had already been vetted and because doing so would ensure the availability of existing tools to help health departments prepare. The resulting Public Health Accreditation Board (PHAB) Standards & Measures were ultimately organized into 12 Domains, the first 10 addressing the 10 EPHS, with two domains added to address management/administration and governance. Organization of the PHAB Standards & Measures around the EPHS also mirrored several states' accreditation efforts based on the EPHS and reflected local health departments' adoption of the EPHS as a framework around which to base their work. PHAB accreditation provided a way for health departments to benchmark their provision of the EPHS, allowing them to understand the extent to which they are providing the EPHS and holding them publicly accountable for their performance.

The World Health Organization uses their own Essential Package of Health Services and additional sub-specialties have tailored the EPHS as well. As the revised framework is adopted, other initiatives may update their contents as well.

== See also ==
- Public health
- Centers for Disease Control and Prevention
