= GlobalMedic =

Non-governmental organization

- Formation: 1998
- Type: Disaster relief Capacity building
- Headquarters: 35 Coronet Rd, Etobicoke; Toronto, Ontario; M8Z 2L8
- Region served: Global operations
- Parent organization: David McAntony Gibson Foundation (DMGF)
- Staff: 3
- Volunteers: 1,000+
- Website: globalmedic.ca

GlobalMedic is a non-sectarian humanitarian-aid non-governmental organization based in Etobicoke, Toronto, Ontario, Canada, and the operational arm of the David McAntony Gibson Foundation (DMGF), a registered Canadian charity. It provides disaster relief to large scale catastrophes around the world and also carries out humanitarian capacity building programs in post-conflict nations. Time magazine recognized the work of GlobalMedic in its 2010 Time 100 issue. Rahul Singh, a Toronto paramedic, founded the David McAntony Gibson Foundation in 1998 in honour of a best friend who lost his life the same year.

GlobalMedic has a roster of over 1,000 volunteers from across Canada that includes many professional rescuers, police officers, firefighters and paramedics who donate their time to respond overseas. The volunteers compose the Rapid Response Teams (RRTs) that operate rescue units designed to save disaster victims, Water Purification Units (WPUs) designed to provide clean drinking water; and Emergency Medical Units (EMUs) that use inflatable field hospitals to provide emergency medical treatment.

Since 2004, GlobalMedic teams have deployed to over 60 humanitarian disasters around the world.

== Origins and volunteer training ==
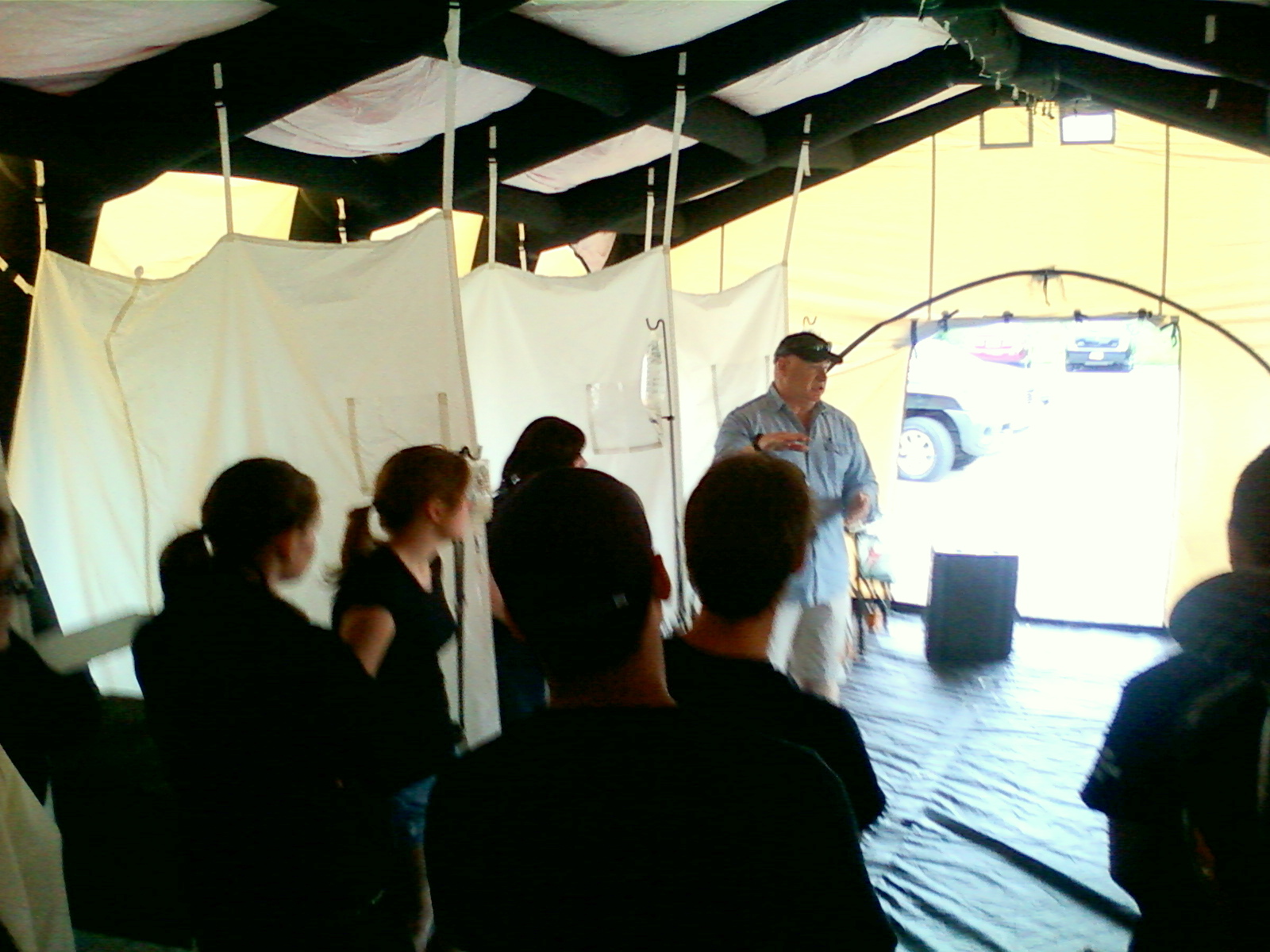
GlobalMedic trainees being instructed on procedures inside an inflatable field hospital tent during one of its cross-Canada training sessions, June 2011

Rahul Singh, a Toronto paramedic, created GlobalMedic in 1998 after seeing ineffective and wasteful relief efforts deployed in Nepal. Singh was touring the country when disastrous monsoon downpours triggered numerous mudslides, resulting in the destruction of several villages. Mr. Singh later noted in an interview that "There were inefficient relief efforts. I decided to do something to ensure efficient and immediate relief to disaster-struck people. After returning [to Canada], I founded GlobalMedic".

GlobalMedic later established annual Rapid Response training days near its Toronto headquarters and at several other locations across Canada. Recruiting is concentrated on, but not restricted to, members of paramedic services, police forces and others in professional rescue service communities. Rapid Response training days typically involve groups of trainees receiving several lectures and demonstrations, and typically involve "hands on" experience with the various inflatable hospital tents and water purification systems that are employed in the field. The large inflatable tent structures can be deployed in minutes after arriving in a disaster zone, allowing its medics to concentrate on providing immediate triage and emergency medical care.

By June 2011, some 120 people attended GlobalMedic's annual training day near its Toronto headquarters, with attendance growing to approximately 150 trainees in 2013. Several other recruiting and training sessions were also being held across Canada annually.

== Deployments ==
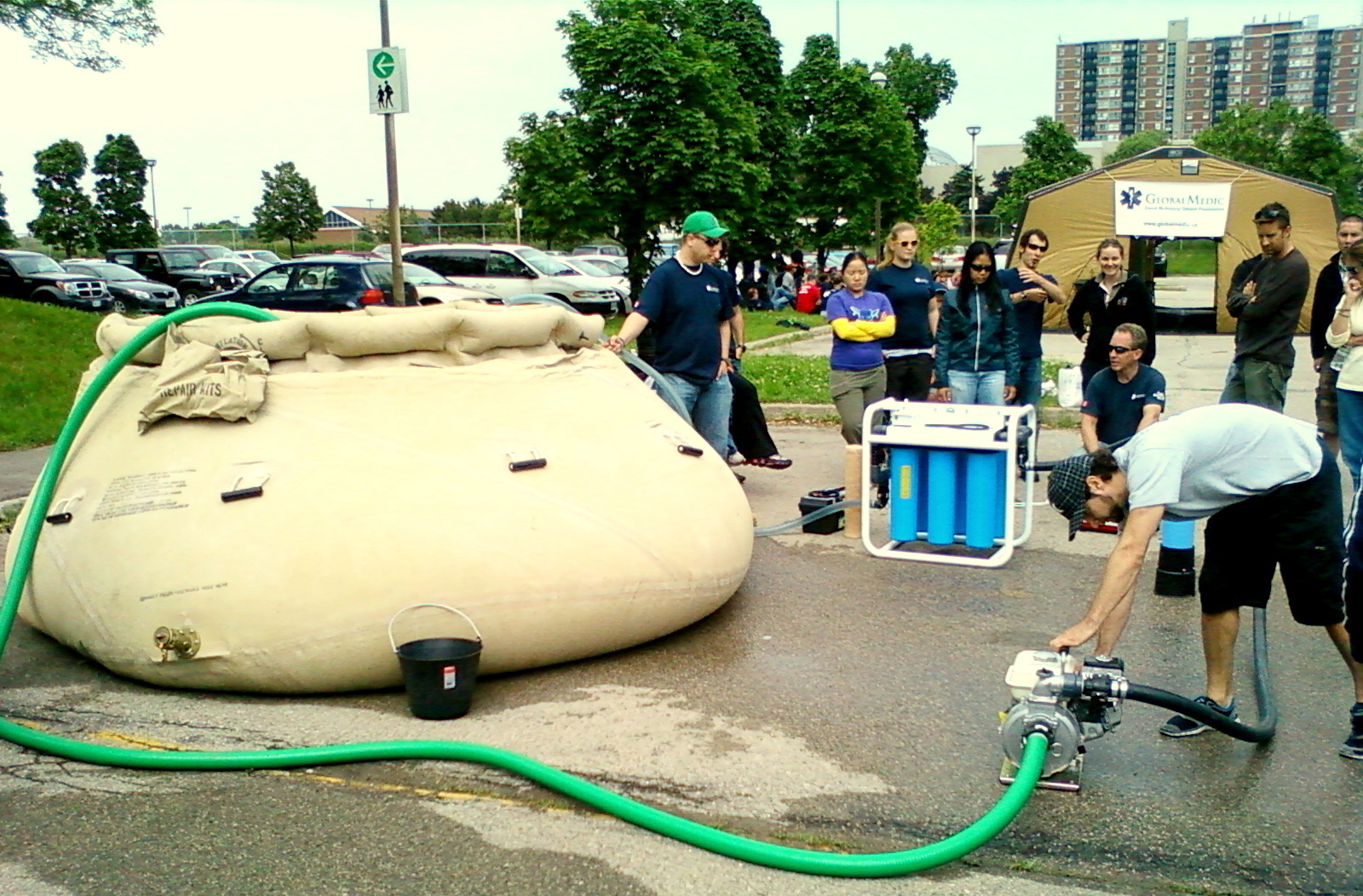
Trainees practice assembling and operating a Nomad water purification system (blue unit), capable of producing 100 litres of purified drinking water per minute being fed into in a canvas reservoir at left

GlobalMedic volunteers make up the Rapid Response Teams (RRTs) that operate a Rescue Unit designed to save disaster victims; a Water Purification Unit (WPU) designed to provide clean drinking water; and an Emergency Medical Unit (EMU) that uses inflatable field hospitals to restore medical infrastructure. Since 2004, GlobalMedic teams have deployed to over 60 humanitarian disasters around the world. Responses have included hurricanes in Grenada and Guatemala; earthquakes in Pakistan, Indonesia, Peru, Haiti and Japan; tsunamis in Sri Lanka, the Solomon Islands and Japan; typhoons in the Philippines; floods in Pakistan, Bangladesh, Mexico, Sudan, Somalia and India; and complex humanitarian emergencies in Gaza, Libya and Somalia.

The deployment of its medical volunteers and its field hospitals and clinics are capable of treating hundreds of patients per day, The organization additionally identified that it can make an even greater post-disaster impact by preventing waterborne diseases from causing secondary disasters such as typhoid and dysentery epidemics. Such epidemics can occur after earthquakes that damage municipal or regional water treatment facilities and even, counter-intuitively, following severe hurricanes, typhoons or monsoons that flood large land areas with turbid, contaminated water. The organization and its volunteers work to help prevent secondary epidemics by having its WPUs both distribute decontamination tablets and by setting up portable water purification equipment which can render even completely contaminated water sources safe for humans. This is achieved by various methods, including filtration media, flocculation, chemical disinfection and the application of ultraviolet light (UV light), which breaks down the genetic code of almost all microorganisms.

After arriving in a crisis area, motorcycles are sometimes employed to transport and set up small suitcase-sized Noah Trekker water purification units, due to their ability to circumnavigate damaged roadways and other rough terrain in order to reach outlying regions in need of aid. In areas without electrical power, the small purification units will operate off of a motorcycle's 12 volt battery with its engine running, able to purify about 200 litres of water per hour.

Some of GlobalMedic's notable deployments include:

=== Typhoon Haiyan Philippines catastrophe, 2013 ===
In the wake of Typhoon Haiyan which generated Category 5 winds that exceeded all previously recorded values, as well as a storm surge of more than 6 metres (20 feet) height that built up in 'mere minutes', large areas of the Philippines were heavily damaged. More than 5,000 dead, 1,600 people missing, and 23,000 injuries were initially reported in the first two weeks. Two months after the storm would see the confirmed death toll easily exceeding 6,000 with some 4 million people made homeless.

GlobalMedic had its first four-man team airborne to the Philippines a day after the disaster, soon establishing a headquarters and three teams based in key areas of the disaster zone, operating out of Iloilo, Cebu, and the worst hit location, Tacloban. Within 10 days over 20 rescuers and disaster responders were providing medical assistance and, of equal importance, safe drinking water using a Rainfresh AquaResponse10 water purification system and over 10 separate Trekker purification units. A larger Nomad water unit was also shipped to Tacloban, capable of purifying 100 liters of water per minute. Over 1.4 million water purification tablets were also shipped to the region as well from the organization's Toronto headquarters. Using connections established on five previous humanitarian relief missions in the Philippines, GlobalMedic had its water purification equipment flown to Tacloban and Ormoc on a private C-130 Hercules a day after their arrival.

Teams also initiated a Quick Intervention Project to deliver bags of rice and boxes of food obtained from within the Philippines, alongside of a water tankering program using tank trucks to speed the delivery of safe water to surrounding communities. Employing two tank trunks, its volunteers attempted to deliver clean water to some 50 communities surrounding Tacloban, but could only service three to four of them a day due to the demand at each location.

GlobalMedic also ordered an additional inflatable field hospital from Dynamic Air Shelters of Grand Bank, Newfoundland and Labrador for immediate shipment to replace a damaged district hospital in Sara on Panay Island. The 46 feet (14 m) by 56 feet (17 m) hospital tent structure was funded in part by the Province of Newfoundland and Labrador which contributed $151,000 for the unit. Critical medications, emergency shelters, tents and other supplies and assistance for the Philippines were also being received from partner charities and agencies, including Health Partners International of Canada, the Compassionate Service Society (CSS Charity) and the Léger Foundation in Quebec.

Included among the volunteer responders was Pipito Biclar, a Filipino doctor born in the region and who was serving as a Toronto EMS paramedic after arriving in Canada. The reports emanating from the disaster zone prompted Rahul Singh to comment "[the] situation on the ground is dire. We are in a race against time to stave off disease and keep people alive. If we fail to deliver, the suffering will be unimaginable."

The deployment became based at a temporary facility in Cebu, headed by Matt Capobianco, GlobalMedic's Manager of Emergency Programs. The Philippines response was joined by other GlobalMedic team members on assignment in India at the time the disaster occurred, and who then were quickly transferred to Tacloban. Among them was David Sakaki, a firefighter from Kamloops, British Columbia, who later returned to Canada and reported he was amazed that anyone had survived within the zone of destruction, which he had observed was spread out over great distances from the Filipino city. "The airport is gone. ... There's no power ... [the city] is just in ruins. There isn't a building that's untouched. It doesn't matter how far out of Tacloban one drives, the degree of destruction is the same." Sakaki believed the number of fatalities would greatly exceed a projected estimate of 6,000 deaths.

By the end of November 2013, GlobalMedic had treated some 1,200 patients in their field hospitals. By the second half of January 2014 its staff and assistants had distributed more than five million water purification pills and also purified over 2.4 million litres of contaminated water—making it both safe to drink and palatable—with their dozen Noah Trekkers, a Nomad purification unit, as well as some 3,000 smaller household purification units produced by volunteers in Toronto and Montreal that month. Its medical staff were treating patients at a rate of 'hundreds per day' in its clinics, while other volunteers were helping to rebuild damaged medical facilities so they could resume their own operations. Fresh teams of medics and volunteers were being rotated into the disaster zone ever few weeks.

=== Horn of Africa drought, 2011–2012 ===
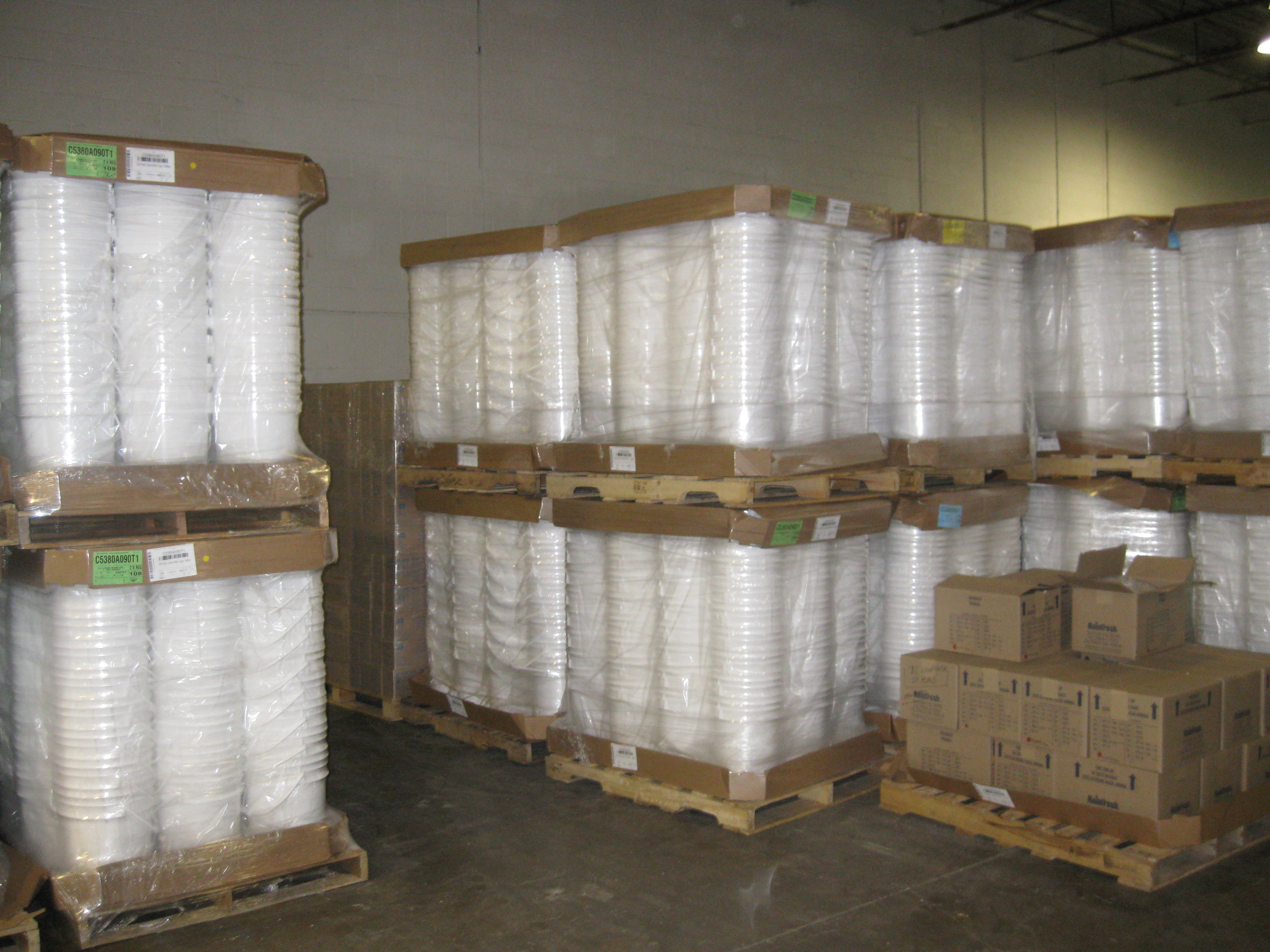
Some of the approximate 2,000 Rainfresh Water Filtration units in kit form produced by GlobalMedic volunteers during the Fall of 2011, for emergency shipment to drought areas in Kenya and Somalia

Between July 2011 and mid-2012, a severe drought affected the entire East Africa region, often referred to as the Horn of Africa drought. Said to be the worst in 60 years, the East Africa drought caused a severe water and food crisis across Somalia, Djibouti, Ethiopia and Kenya, threatening the lives and livelihoods of over nine million people.

GlobalMedic responded by freighting over 2.8 million Aquatab purification pills and PUR water cleansing sachets to Kenya and Somalia. The volunteer organization additionally produced over two thousand water filtration devices using large plastic food pails, converted by dozens of its volunteers in the borrowed warehouse space of a Mississauga, Ontario air freight company. The filtration kits were then matched with commercial Envirogard ceramic water filter cartridges.

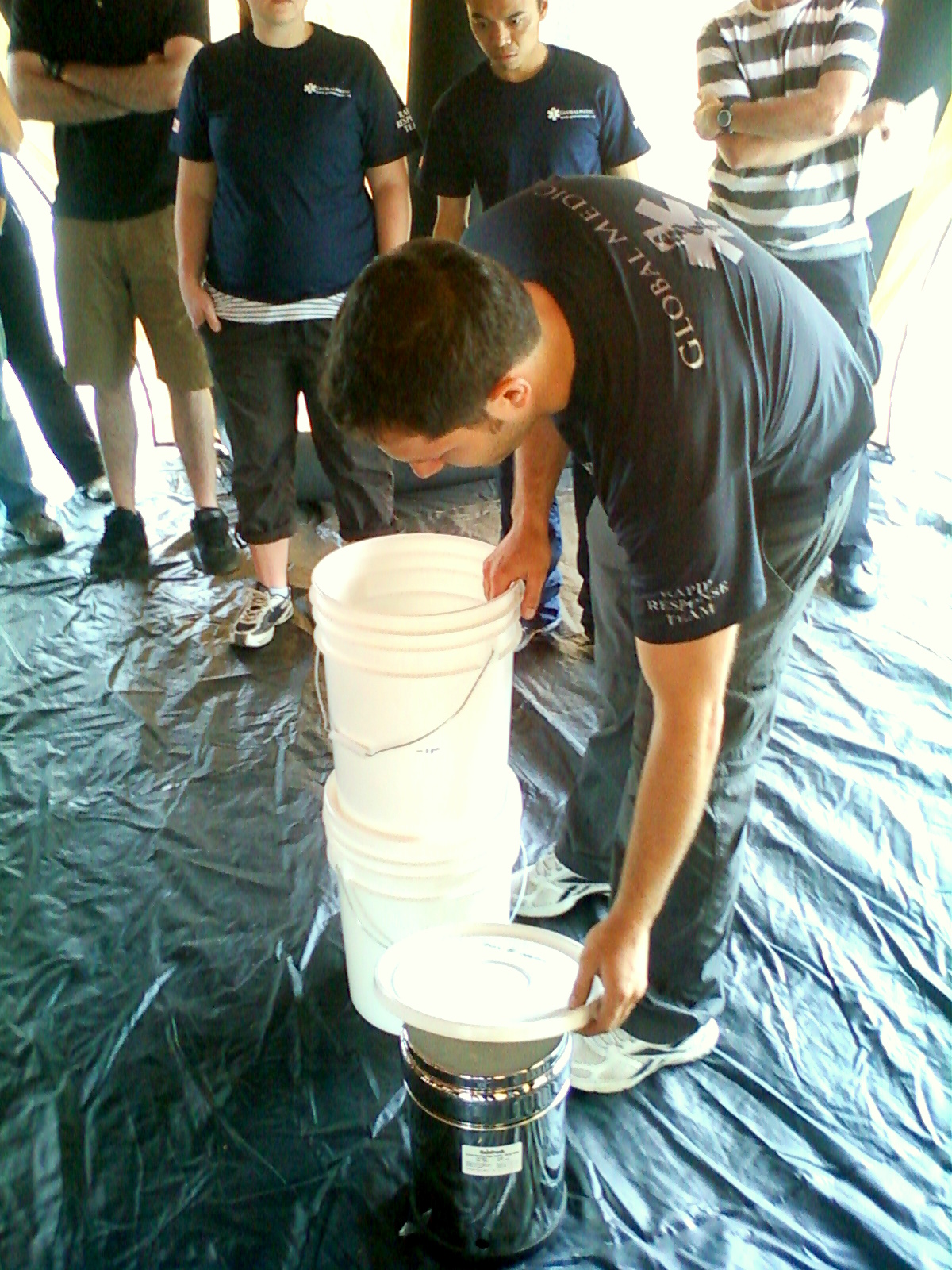
Matt Capobianco demonstrating a small, four filter gravity-fed water purification unit, Toronto, June 2011

The components for two thousand filtration units were then marshaled together and shipped by intermodal containers to the drought region, with each kit able to provide the clean water needs of a large family. A GlobalMedic WPU team travelled to Africa and worked with local aid agencies, including the Compassionate Service Society, ADRA Kenya, ADRA Somalia, MATE and FCC Kenya, to distribute its purification supplies and filtration kits. The materials distributed by GlobalMedic's WPU team resulted in the provision of tens of millions litres of safe drinking water to the affected populations in three countries. Ten Emergency Medical Kits (EMKs) for the treatment of some 6,000 patients were also supplied to aid internally displaced refugees in Benadir and Mogadishu in Somalia.

=== Haiti earthquake catastrophe, 2010 ===
GlobalMedic was one of the international relief organizations to respond to the 2010 Haiti earthquake. The organization worked with local partners to quickly provide emergency medical assistance and clean drinking water to people in the Carrefour district of Port-au-Prince. An initial Rapid Response Team, composed of paramedics, a doctor and an engineer traveled into the city with an inflatable field hospital tent structure, an Explorer and several Trekker water purification units, plus millions of water purification tablets.

The advance team arrived two days after the earthquake even though the country's airports were rendered unusable to any movements except military flights. They journeyed there by flying to the neighbouring Dominican Republic, and then taking an arduous 18-plus hours land route over chaotic roads in several rented trucks and a small bus. Among the advance group were Rahul Singh and Dr. Michael Howatt, who assisted throughout the night with surgeries at the Université Adventiste d'Haïti (Adventist University of Haiti) in the capital city starting shortly after his arrival there. A large capacity Explorer water purification unit was also set up within 12 hours of the group's arrival, drawing water from a ruptured swimming pool being filled with river-fed ground water.

Within a month of their first arrival GlobalMedic had distributed millions of Aquatab purification tablets, set up two inflatable field hospitals that were treating 300 patients a day, brought in satellite phones and radios, and set up some 64 water purification units including 62 portable Noah Trekkers dispatched daily by a team of 15 to 20 hired motorcyclists. Motorcycles were used extensively due to their ability to circumnavigate damaged roadways and rough terrain in order to reach outlying areas in need of aid. The Canadian organization ultimately treated over 7,000 patients, distributed over 10 million litres of clean drinking water, five million water purification tablets, and deployed 20 Canadian volunteer rescuers at a time in response to the Haiti earthquake.

=== Burmese cyclone and Sichuan, China earthquake, 2008 ===
In May 2008 Cyclone Nargis sent a storm surge 40 kilometers up Myanmar's densely populated Irrawaddy river delta, causing catastrophic destruction and at least 138,000 fatalities. It was the worst natural disaster in the country's history, with allegations that government officials stopped updating the death toll after 138,000 to minimize political fallout. Relief efforts were slowed for political reasons as Myanmar's military rulers initially resisted large-scale international aid. Hampering the relief efforts, only ten days after the cyclone, nearby central China was hit by a massive earthquake, known as the Sichuan earthquake.

The powerful earthquake in Sichuan Province in May 2008 measured 8.0 M_{w} (surface wave magnitude), killing more than 69,000 people and leaving some 4.8 million people homeless, though the number may have been as high as 11 million. It was the strongest earthquake in China since 1950, and the 21st deadliest earthquake of all time when it occurred.

Shortly after the Burmese cyclone, GlobalMedic's disaster relief staff were staged in neighbouring Thailand after being refused permission by the Burmese military government to enter the country to distribute aid and water purification supplies. After frustrating delays land routes were established from a town on the Thai border in order to transport aid to the disaster areas using Burmese partners. A portion of GlobalMedic's team was then unexpectedly diverted from Thailand into China's disaster zone, less than 48 hours after the massive Sichuan earthquake.

In Sichuan Province where more than 10 million people were affected, the quake damaged over 1,200 water treatment plants and more than 800 water storage tanks, as well as some 5,000 kilometres of buried water pipes. The earthquake and its aftershocks severely compromised the supply of safe drinking water. Operating from the provincial capital of Chengdu, GlobalMedic's team helped set up and operate some 140 Noah Trekker suitcase-sized purification units in the area, each capable of supplying safe drinking water for about 1,000 people. They also brought in a much larger Nomad purification unit with a flow rate of 100 litres per minute, capable of serving some 70,000 people. Its volunteer staff further coordinated the distribution of almost 22 million Aquatab water purification tablets, each capable of disinfecting a litre of contaminated water.

After being asked by the Chinese Government to provide disaster assistance, GlobalMedic worked with the Canadian International Development Agency (CIDA) on its aid delivery and coordinated directly with the Sichuan Water and Farmland Bureau. It then helped the staff of local water distribution utilities set up and maintain the purification equipment shipped to China, and to also distribute its water purification tablets.

GlobalMedic's efforts in China were lauded by Jim Karygiannis, M.P., a Canadian Member of Parliament, who joined in helping to load emergency supplies for shipment from the organization's Toronto headquarters, saying:

GlobalMedic is acting. These volunteers are generously giving of their personal time to help people in need. Their selfless acts of kindness exemplify the best of what makes us Canadians.

== Acknowledgements and honours ==
For his work with GlobalMedic, Canadian Prime Minister Stephen Harper presented Rahul Singh with the ICCC's "Humanitarian of the Year Award" in 2006. Singh also became a recipient of "Canada's Top 40 Under 40 Award" in 2009, and was named to the 2010 Time 100 list of "The World's Most Influential People". The Globe and Mail included him on the list of "Canadians changing the world", and he was chosen by the Toronto Star as one of 12 "Canadians changing the way we think". In 2012, Singh was made a member of the Order of Ontario.

Following Singh being portrayed as among the world's 100 most influential people in 2010, he and GlobalMedic have been called "the face of Canadian relief efforts around the world".

== See also ==
- Canadian Medical Assistance Team (CMAT)
- Disaster Assistance Response Team (DART)
- Humanitarian aid
- Médecins Sans Frontières (MSF, or Doctors Without Borders)
- Not Just Tourists
- Sphere Project
