= Rahul Singh (paramedic) =

Canadian paramedic and relief worker

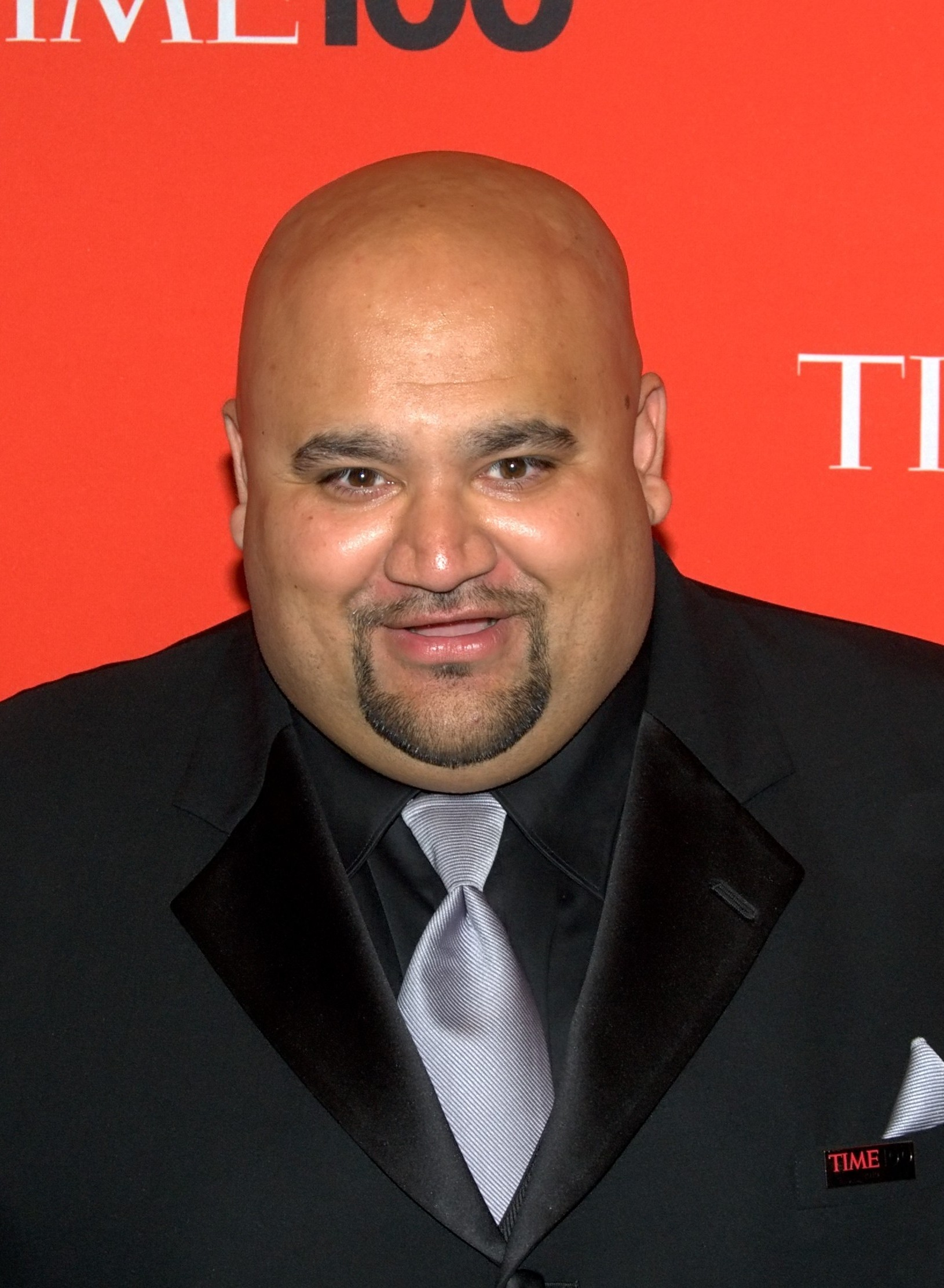
Rahul Singh at the Time 100 ceremony in 2010

Rahul Singh, OOnt (born October 1970 in Montreal, Quebec) is a Canadian paramedic and founder and Executive Director of GlobalMedic, a humanitarian relief organization that provides disaster relief in areas affected by natural disasters or complex emergencies. Since founding GlobalMedic in 1998, Singh has led 30 international missions with the organization.

== Honours ==
Singh’s work around the world has been widely recognized. For his work with GlobalMedic, Singh was named to the 2010 Time 100 list of "The World's Most Influential People". He was a recipient of “Canada’s Top 40 Under 40 Award” in 2009. The Globe and Mail included him on the list of “Canadians changing the world”, and he was chosen by the Toronto Star as one of 12 “Canadians changing the way we think.”

In 2006, Prime Minister Stephen Harper presented him with the ICCC’s “Humanitarian of the Year Award.”

In 2012, he was made a member of the Order of Ontario.
