= Application service automation =

Application service automation is the field where the operations needed to deploy and service data center applications are automated in order to centrally and accurately control application change.

With application service automation operations teams can transform manual, error-prone application service tasks into reliable, repeatable and timely processes to gain control over application packaging, deployment, change, troubleshooting, recovery and auditing.

Application service automation enables the simple modeling of application workflows, including tiers and dependencies and executes these across any heterogeneous data center environment – physical, virtual and cloud. By simplifying operational complexity and eliminating application configuration errors Application Service Automation enables heightened uptime while reducing the time and cost of servicing applications.

Automated application deployment is considered a subset of application service automation.

== See also ==
- Application service management
- Application performance management
- System administration
