= Not Just Tourists =

- Formation: 1990
- Headquarters: St. Catharines
- Key people: Ken Taylor and Denise Taylor
- Website: https://njt.net/

Not Just Tourists is a volunteer-led grassroots organization headquartered in Canada. Not Just Tourists collects surplus healthcare supplies in Canada, USA, and UK and sends them overseas as donations with tourists visiting low income countries.

Not Just Tourists has chapters in Ottawa, Niagara, Waterloo, Barrie, Calgary, Manitoba, London (Ontario), London (UK), Halifax and Okanagan (British Columbia).

== History ==
Not Just Tourists was founded in 1990 in St. Catharines by Ken Taylor, M.D. and his wife Denise, who took medical supplies to Cuba.

The Ottawa chapter was launched in 2005 by Mary Metcalfe and is currently coordinated by her husband Jacques Chenail. Ottawa and area travellers have brought suitcases of medical supplies to over 90 countries. The group also supports medical missions and contributes to ocean containers in support of medical humanitarian aid projects in countries such as Syria, Pakistan, Honduras, Cuba, and many other countries in need. Through its extensive regional network, NJT-Ottawa has also located and contributed donated wheelchairs, walkers, hospital beds, CPAP machines, and many other medical support devices, as well as medical supplies.

The Toronto chapter was started in 2015 by Avi D’Souza. The group of volunteers meet on a weekly basis at Roncesvalles United Church to pack suitcases.

In 2017, Drew Cumpson started the Kingston chapter, nurse Simone Feller opened the Halifax chapter, and the first UK chapter was launched by Claudia Hon M.D. in London.

Cindy Ross, M.D. started the Orange Beach chapter in 2021, the first US chapter.

In 2020, the Manitoba chapter sent personal protective equipment to China.

In 2021, two volunteers privately arranged several shipping containers of medical supplies to be sent to Cuba.

== Activities ==
Surplus medical supplies are donated by hospitals, clinics, medical suppliers, and individuals. Donated supplied usually include gauze, bandages, surgical instruments, masks, gloves, antiseptics, intravenous kits, urinary supplies and birthing kits. Suitcase contents are typically worth $200 to $400. Not Just Tourists has delivered over 10,000 suitcases to 82 countries

Supplies are delivered to low income countries including Syria, Cuba, China, Peru, Mexico, Honduras, Uganda, Guatemala, Cameroon, Rwanda, Swaziland, Chad, El Salvador, Ghana, Ecuador, India, and Kenya.
