= Nationwide Wireless Priority Service =

American system for telecoms triage

The Nationwide Wireless Priority Service (WPS) is a system in the United States that allows high-priority emergency telephone calls to avoid congestion on wireless telephone networks. This complements the Government Emergency Telecommunications Service (GETS), which allows such calls to avoid congestion on landline networks. The service is overseen by the Federal Communications Commission and administered by the Office of Emergency Communications (OEC) in the Department of Homeland Security. WPS was previously administered by the National Communications System (NCS) which had been created by President Kennedy by a Presidential Memorandum on August 21, 1963, and expanded by President Reagan by Executive Order 12472 on April 3, 1984. On July 6, 2012, President Obama signed Executive Order 13618, which eliminated the NCS as a separate organization; it was merged into the Office of Emergency Communications (OEC), which had been created in 2007. A ceremony to retire the colors of the NCS and to celebrate the legacy of the organization was held on August 30, 2012, in Arlington, Virginia.

During a local or national emergency, wireless telephone networks are likely to become congested with calls. Even absent emergencies, some towers and networks receive more calls than they can handle. WPS allows high-priority calls to bypass that congestion and receive priority by dialing *+272+DST_NUMBER+send (the 'star' key followed by 272 followed by the destination number followed by the dial key). The system is authorized only for use by national security and emergency preparedness personnel, classified into five categories:

- Executive leadership and policy makers (e.g. the President of the United States and members of Congress)
- Disaster response/military command and control
- Public Health, safety, and law enforcement command
- Public services/utilities and public welfare
- Disaster recovery

Unlike the GETS system, which provides landline priority telephone calls, participation in the WPS system is optional for telephone companies. As such, support is only available on selected networks and usually requires additional fees for activation, availability, and use.

Before using the system, each user must receive authorization from the National Communications System and subscribe to the service with a participating provider. Once authorized, a user simply needs to prepend calls the vertical service code of "*272" to receive priority consideration on the wireless network.

Although the system is said to ensure a high probability of call completion, it is not without serious limitations. The WPS will not preempt calls in progress, so the user will have to wait for bandwidth to open. It is also not yet supported by all carriers. In order for a call to work, telephone infrastructure must be powered and functioning. Finally, a call that receives priority using WPS does not automatically get priority on landline networks. Therefore, congestion on the Public Switched Telephone Network may prevent the call from completion unless the user makes additional steps to access the GETS service for landline calls as well. Because of these and other limitations, the WPS explicitly does not guarantee call completion.

AT&T was the first to deploy this service with full functionality end to end.

== See also ==
- Government Emergency Telecommunications Service
- ACCOLC, a similar system in the UK
