= Government Emergency Telecommunications Service =

American system for telecoms triage

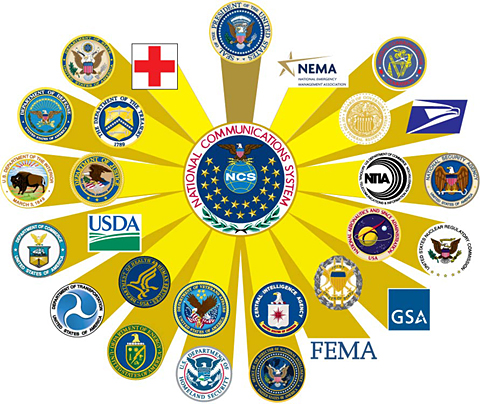
The logo of the Government Emergency Telecommunications Service.

The Government Emergency Telecommunications Service (GETS) is a White House–directed emergency telephone service provided by a division of the Department of Homeland Security. GETS uses enhancements based on existing commercial technology

== Purpose ==
GETS supports federal, state, local, and tribal government, industry, and non-governmental organization personnel during crisis or emergencies by providing emergency access and priority processing for local and long-distance telephone calls on the public switched telephone network. GETS is intended to be used in an emergency or crisis situation when the public switched telephone network is congested and the probability of completing a call over normal or other alternate telecommunication means is reduced.

GETS is necessary because reliance on telecommunications has been accompanied by an increased vulnerability to network congestion and system failures. Although backup systems are in place, disruptions in service can still occur. Natural disasters, power outages, fiber cable cuts, and software problems can cripple the telephone services of entire regions. Additionally, congestion in the public switched telephone network, such as the well-documented "Mother's Day phenomenon", in which Mother's Day generally has the highest blocking of long-distance telephone calls of any single day of the year, can prevent access to circuits. However, during times of emergency, crisis, or war, government personnel and emergency workers need to know that their calls will go through.

For cellular telephone users, a related capability is offered by the Nationwide Wireless Priority Service (WPS). WPS users have the ability to queue at the top for the next available communications channel to their registered base station in order to place their call by dialing *+272+[destination number]+send, greatly enhancing their ability to complete wireless calls during times of congestion. WPS is available only to designated leadership at all government levels, national security, emergency responders, and private sector critical infrastructure personnel, as approved by the NCS and Federal Communications Commission (FCC) Rules and Requirements.

GETS uses these major types of networks:

- The local networks provided by local exchange carriers and Wireless providers, such as cellular carriers and personal communications services (PCS)
- The major long-distance networks provided by interexchange carriers such as AT&T, Verizon, and Sprint, including their international services
- Government-leased networks, including the Federal Technology Service and the Defense Switched Network

In accordance with Section 1(g)5 of Executive Order 12472, the NCS also performs research and development to further enhance the GETS and WPS services through the use of new packet-based technologies (such as IP, or Internet Protocol). This work is done in the NCS' lab, formerly referred to as the eXperimental Testbed Environment. The multi-vendor lab is in the process of preparation for interoperability tests with other labs and research groups to validate these new approaches in today's Next Generation Networks (NGNs). Interoperability between NGNs and legacy telephone systems will continue to be an area of high interest and more elaborate studies for the NCS and their Committee of Principals throughout the transition from these legacy systems.

== Accessibility ==
GETS is accessed through a dialing plan and Personal Identification Number (PIN) card verification system. Using common telephone equipment, the user dials the universal access number 710-627-4387 (710-NCS-GETS). A prompt directs the entry of the user's assigned twelve-digit PIN and the destination telephone number. Once the user is authenticated as valid, the call receives special treatment.

== Effectiveness ==
GETS is designed to provide a 90% call completion rate when call volume is eight times normal capacity.

== See also ==
- Nationwide Wireless Priority Service
