= Aviation taxation and subsidies =

Taxes and subsidies related to aviation

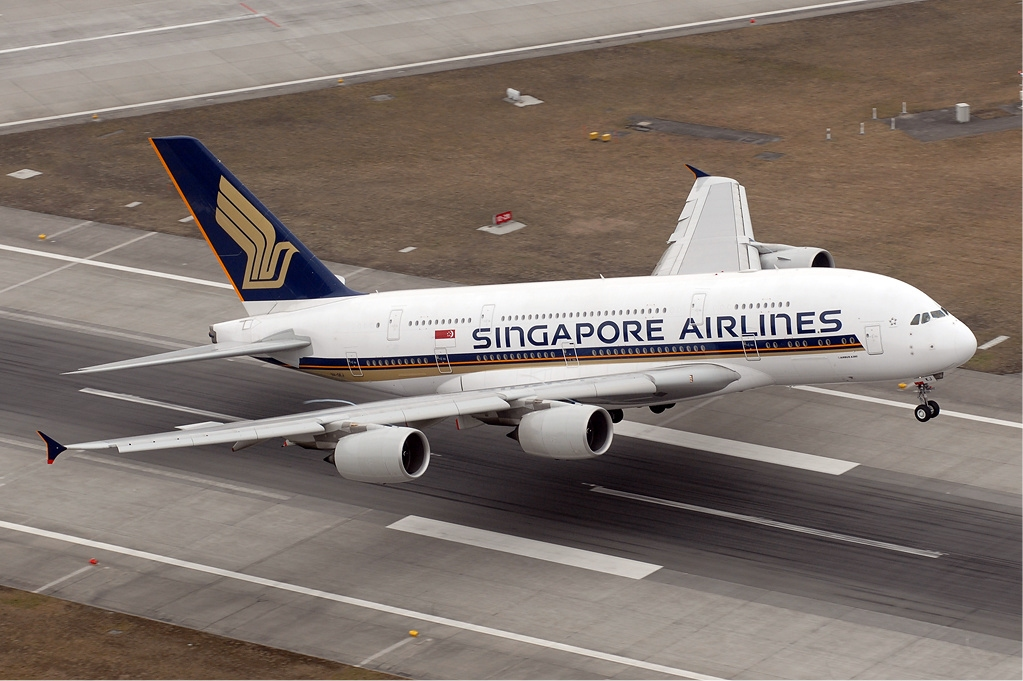
An Airbus A380 departs. Aviation taxation and subsidies affect the prices of airline seats and jet fuel.

Types of aviation taxation and subsidies, and implementations, are listed below. Taxation is one of several methods to mitigate the environmental impact of aviation.

== Types of taxes ==
- Airport improvement fee, paid by passengers to the airport or government
- Air passenger taxes, paid by passengers to the government for environmental reasons; may be variable by distance and includes domestic flights
  - Departure tax, paid by passengers leaving the country to the government (sometimes also applies outside of aviation)
- Jet fuel tax, paid by airline companies to the government for the jet fuel (kerosene) they burn
- Landing fee, paid by airline companies to the airports they land on
- Solidarity tax on airplane tickets (Chirac Tax), paid by passengers to Unitaid, a global health initiative against HIV/AIDS, malaria and tuberculosis

=== Fuel taxes ===
According to the Amsterdam-based international environmental organisation Friends of the Earth (2005), aviation does not pay tax on fuel and aviation's expansion is fuelled by its exemption from taxes. In the UK, aviation got £9 billion tax free benefits in 2003. Friends of the Earth argued that fuel tax would give incentive to improve the energy efficiency of operations, and would be a more effective response than emission trading. Chicago Convention prevents double taxation on aviation fuel on international flights, but does not prohibts it altogether. Almost always taxes are exempt because of bilateral air agreements between countries.

This is not always the case for domestic flights. For example, in the United States, on domestic flights fuel is taxed 19.3 cents per gallon on piston aviation fuel, 21.8 cents per gallon on JetA, and 4.3 cents per gallon on commercial jet fuel. This has been a very effective funding source for air traffic control without the complications and expenses of collecting on a per-flight basis.

=== VAT ===
Airlines are typically exempt from VAT, especially on international flights.

== European Union ==
Air passenger taxes in Europe: Has air passenger taxes Will introduce air passenger taxes No taxes, but supports EU-wide taxes No longer has air passenger taxes No air passenger taxes

Historically, EU aviation fuel was tax free and attracted no VAT. Commercial aviation fuel taxation in the EU was banned in 2003 by the Energy Taxation Directive (2003/96/EC), except with bilateral agreements between member states. However, as of 2018, no such agreements exist.

In November 2019, the Finance Ministers of Belgium, Bulgaria, Denmark, France, Germany, Italy, Luxembourg, the Netherlands and Sweden presented a joint statement calling on the European Commission, more specifically European Commissioner for Climate Action Frans Timmermans, to introduce EU-wide taxes on aviation so as to charge the entire aviation industry more for its emissions and pollution, and put all member states on level pegging. Citing the fact that aviation causes around 2.5% of global CO_{2} emissions, the Ministers proposed both uniform air passenger taxes as well as kerosene taxes (both excise duties and VAT). In a September–October 2019 poll conducted by the European Investment Bank (EIB) amongst 28,088 EU citizens from the then 28 member states, 72% said they would support a carbon tax on flights.

As part of its Fit for 55 package proposed in July 2021 by the European Commission, the European Union is planning to gradually introduce a kerosene tax (for both private and commercial flights) between 2023 and 2033 at EUR 10.75 per gigajoule (GJ), while sustainable fuel such e-kerosene will benefit from a minimum rate of zero.

=== Austria ===
Austrian distance tax categories (2018): Category 1: 3.50 euros Category 2: 7.50 euros Category 3: 17.50 euros

Austria introduced a Flight Tax Act (Flugabgabegesetz, FlugAbgG) in April 2011 similar to the German aviation taxation system. In 2013, the fees for short and medium-haul flights were reduced from 8 euros to 7 euros and from 20 euros to 15 euros respectively, and halved again in 2018. According to §5.1 of the Flight Tax Act, the flight tax depends on the distance to the destination airfield per passenger:

- for short distances 3.50 euros
- for medium distances 7.50 euros
- for long distances 17.50 euros

During the COVID-19 pandemic, airlines in Europe had to temporarily cease most operations and had requested a total of 12.8 billion euros in government support by mid-April 2020, according to a Transport & Environment, Greenpeace and Carbon Market Watch report. At the time, Austria was the only country which insisted (through Minister of Climate Action, Environment, Energy, Mobility, Innovation and Technology Leonore Gewessler of the Greens) that a government bailout of its flag carrier (Austrian Airlines, with about 7,000 employees) should be linked to climate targets. On 8 June 2020, the Austrian conservative–green coalition government concluded a support deal for Austrian Airlines (a subsidiary of Lufthansa) for 150 million euros in taxpayer grants, and 300 million euros in banking loans that are to be paid back. This was significantly less than expected (Austrian Airlines had applied for 767 million euros), and came under the following conditions:

- All airline tickets got an immediate uniform 12 euro environmental tax. This altered an earlier plan to introduce a flight ticket tax system of 3.50 to 17 euros (depending on the route) in 2021.
- All airline tickets cost at least 40 euros in total. This ended the practice of selling tickets as cheap as 10 euros (for example by Ryanair's Austrian subsidiary Lauda, which offered 100,000 tickets for 9.99 euros in 2019; other such cheap airlines in Austria include EasyJet and Wizz Air) in order to discourage flying in general.
- For flights less than 350 kilometres away, a special tax of 30 euros must be paid to discourage short flights (an unprecedented environmental measure in the EU).
- Airline connections that covered distances that could be travelled within three hours by train were prohibited.
- Austrian Airlines had to reduce its CO_{2} emissions by 50% by 2030 (or by 33% by 2030 compared to 2005).

=== Belgium ===
In 2022, the Belgian government introduced an aviation tax for all airline flights of 10 euros within 500 kilometres, two euros if the destination is located more than 500 kilometres away and within the EEA and four euros outside the EEA. The reason the tax is higher for short flights is because a shift to trains is more realistic for those distances.

=== France ===
On 9 July 2019, French transport minister Élisabeth Borne announced that France would introduce an eco-tax on passengers in 2020. Flights within the EU, including domestic flights, would be taxed 1.5 euros for economy class and 9 euros for business class, while flights out of the EU would be charged with 3 euros for economy class and 18 euros for business class. Different rules apply to Corsica and other overseas departments and territories of France. The exo-tax was projected to produce 180 million euros in revenue annually.

On 9 June 2020, during the COVID-19 pandemic in France, economy and finance minister Bruno Le Maire announced a financial support programme for the aerospace sector for 15 billion euros. It included the earlier announced bailout of its flag carrier Air France–KLM at 7 billion euros (comprising a state loan of 3 billion and bank loans of 4 billion), with conditions to transform it into the 'most environmentally friendly airline on the planet'. There were several aims, including the protection of 300,000 direct and indirect jobs (100,000 of which were said to be at risk within 6 months), a gradual recovery of the 34 billion annual trade surplus that the French aviation industry produced, and the goal of developing carbon-neutral air travel by 2035 rather than 2050 (for which the civil aviation research council CORAC would receive €1.5 billion in support over three years).

=== Germany ===
German distance tax categories: Category 1: 12.90 euros Category 2: 32.67 euros Category 3: 58.82 euros

Germany's air passenger tax is divided in three categories, with the following taxes since 1 April 2020:

- Category 1 – Europe, Russia, Turkey, Morocco and Algeria: 12.90 euros
- Category 2 – Central Asia, the MENA region (excluding Morocco and Algeria, including Afghanistan and Pakistan), Sahel region: 32.67 euros
- Category 3 – Other countries: 58.82 euros

In 2018 Germany applied 19% VAT on domestic airline tickets.

=== Ireland ===
Ireland had an Air Travel Tax from 2009 until April 2014.

=== Netherlands ===
On 1 July 2008, the Fourth Balkenende cabinet introduced an aviation tax (vliegbelasting or vliegtaks) of 11.25 euros per ticket for flights within Europe and 45 euros for destinations outside Europe. Due to vehement opposition by the aviation industry and travel agencies, the tax was abolished a year later on 1 July 2009, leading to heavy criticism from academia and environmental organisations. Amsterdam Airport Schiphol claimed it lost 900,000 passengers to airports abroad due to the tax, but Vrije Universiteit Amsterdam economist Eric Bartelsman pointed out that the Great Recession reduced air travel across the world, not just in the Netherlands. Tilburg University economist Lans Bovenberg was more positive, arguing aviation taxes should be implemented simultaneously across the entire EU to be effective, and that taxing jet fuel would be a more effective measure than taxing passengers.

In 2017, the Third Rutte cabinet coalition agreement planned to introduce a new aviation tax of 7 euros on every ticket, regardless of destination, on 1 January 2021. Cargo aircraft will pay a tax based on their weight and noise pollution class: up to 3.85 euros per tonne of cargo, with a lower rate for quieter aircraft. The tax, which is projected to produce an annual revenue of 200 million euros, has four goals: reducing CO_{2} emissions, reducing other emissions such as particulates, reducing noise pollution, and preventing a jet fuel tax. The new plan is more likely to succeed because the tax is much lower than in 2008, and most neighbouring countries except Belgium had also introduced aviation taxes in preceding years, making passengers' tax circumvention efforts unlikely. The government was aiming to eventually establish a uniform EU-wide aviation tax.

Since 1 January 2021, an air passenger tax of €7.845 per person per flight applies in the Netherlands. The tax does not apply to transfer passengers, and children under the age of 2. In the Tax Plan 2023, the cabinet proposed to increase the air passenger tax by €18.48 from 2023. Parliament had yet to approve the plans. 1 January 2023, the new tax rate of €26,43 went into force.

=== Sweden ===
Swedish distance tax categories: Category 1: 62 kronor Category 2: 260 kronor Category 3: 416 kronor

Sweden introduced a passenger tax for commercial flights of more than ten passengers in April 2018. As of 2020, Swedish aviation taxes for passengers were divided into three categories, depending on the destination:

- Category 1 – Europe: 62 Swedish kronor
- Category 2 – Russia, Central Asia, the MENA region including Afghanistan and Pakistan, Canada and the United States: 260 Swedish kronor
- Category 3 – Other countries: 416 kronor

In November 2019, the Swedish government of Stefan Löven (Löfven I Cabinet) proposed to collect an annual aviation tax of around 78 million euros. Under the proposal's conditions, the Swedish aviation industry would still be 100% exempt from the Swedish energy tax, carbon dioxide tax and sulphur tax that other companies pay.

== Other countries ==
=== Norway ===
Norway introduced airline passenger fees on 1 June 2016. From 1 June 2016 to 31 March 2020, the fee was 80 Norwegian kroner per passenger. On 1 April 2020, the fee was changed to 75 kroner for passengers with a final destination in Europe and 200 kroner for passengers with a final destination outside Europe. In addition, VAT was added to the tax.

=== Switzerland ===
In June 2020, the Swiss Federal Assembly approved a proposal (passed by the Council of States in 2019) to introduce an environmental levy of 30 to 120 Swiss francs per airline ticket 'depending on distance and [travel] class'; nearly half of the proceeds are to flow into a climate fund for emissions-reduction initiatives. The Swiss oil lobby started a campaign and a referendum against the new CO_{2} laws (which included the aviation tax), and in June 2021, 52% of the Swiss voters rejected them, meaning there will not be aviation taxes in the very near future. Parliament continued to reject several parliamentary initiatives on the subject thereafter. Public support for some kind of airline ticket tax remained high, with 72% of respondents in a June 2022 GfS Zurich survey saying they were in favour: 42% of respondents backed a levy of CHF30 ($30.40) for short-haul flights and CHF120 for long-haul flights, while 50% agreed with even higher charges.

=== United States ===
In the United States, most states tax avgas and jet fuel.

== Subsidies ==
Some governments subsidize airports and passenger customs costs within airports.

The EU Commission in 2014 ruled that subsidies Ryanair received from a regional authority a decade ago had to be repaid (€525,000).

In June 2020, Flemish Economy Minister Hilde Crevits decided that trainings for airplane and helicopter pilots would no longer be subsidised in Flanders from 1 July 2020 onwards.
