= Passenger Movement Charge =

Departure tax imposed in Australia

The passenger movement charge (PMC) is an Australian tax payable by passengers departing Australia on international flights or sea transport, whether or not the passenger intends to return to Australia. The PMC was introduced in July 1995 (replacing the previous departure tax which commenced in October 1978) and was initially described as a charge to partially offset the cost to government of the provision of passenger facilitation at airports, principally customs, immigration and quarantine functions.

Since 1 July 2024 the PMC has been A$70 per passenger over 12 years of age, with a few limited exemptions. The PMC is a flat rate, and not a percentage of the ticket price. The same charge applies for low-price tickets, as well as for free or points tickets, and for first-class fares, and for short-distance flights and long-haul flights. The PMC is imposed in addition to airport fees and airline surcharges. The PMC is paid by airlines and recovered from passengers as part of the fare or as a special charge (e.g., in the case of free or points tickets). In 2001, when the PMC was $30, the revenue from the PMC was approximately A$226 million per annum. According to a 2013 survey by the International Air Transport Association, the average cost of the PMC on the airfare was 3.5%.

== Overview ==
The PMC is levied under the Passenger Movement Charge Act 1978 and collected under the Passenger Movement Charge Collection Act 1978. It is administered by the Australian Border Force. The PMC is levied on all passengers leaving Australia by air or sea, unless if the passenger is exempt. The main exemptions apply to passengers 12 years of age or younger, transit or emergency passengers, crew members, defence personnel and their spouses, among others. The PMC is typically collected by the airline or shipping company, and remitted to the collection agency, presently the Australian Border Force. The PMC also applies to so-called free or points tickets.

=== 1978-1995 ===
Introduced in 1978, the departure tax was initially A$10. Its initial stated aim was to recover costs associated with passenger processing at Australia's air and sea ports. In subsequent budgets, the departure tax was linked to the promotion of tourism either through marketing or through the removal of a cost barrier to travel as in 1988.

The departure tax was increased to A$20 in 1981 but then reduced to A$10 in 1988 to stimulate the tourism industry. In 1991 the rate was increased to A$20 to fund a A$20 million tourism promotion package in an attempt to counter the negative impact of the pilots' dispute of 1989. The departure tax was raised again in 1994 to A$25 to offset the additional cost of tourism promotion expenditure, specifically an additional A$80 million allocated to the development of new tourism products.

=== 1995–present ===
In 1995, the name of the tax was changed to passenger movement charge. The rate has changed on several occasions, with the government in most cases giving various rationales for increases. On 1 July 2024, the rate increased to A$70.

Year	Rate	Rationale
1995	A$27	To offset the cost of customs, immigration and quarantine processing at Australia's borders and the cost of issuing short-term visitor visas.
1998	A$30	To meet the additional costs associated with the transit of people and goods for the Sydney 2000 Olympic Games.
2001	A$38	To fund increased passenger processing costs as part of Australia’s response to the threat of the introduction of foot-and-mouth disease.
2008	A$47	To partially fund national aviation security initiatives.
2012	A$55	No reason provided.
2017	A$60	No reason provided.
Since 1 July 2024	A$70	Legislation implemented authorising an increase to A$70.
Starting 1 January 2027	A$80	No reason provided.

== International comparisons ==
Australia's departure tax is one of the highest in the world. Few jurisdictions levy taxes on departing international passengers, although some charge airport fees to cover the cost of provision of government agency services at the frontiers. In 2013 Australia was ranked 130 out of 140 countries for its relative cost of ticket taxes and airport charges in the World Economic Forum's Travel and Tourism Competitiveness Report.

As of May 2013, only Fiji's Airport Departure Tax, at F$150 (approximately US$85) and the three long-haul rates of the UK's Air Passenger Duty reduced rate at £67-£94 (or approximately US$105–143) for travel in lowest class or standard rate at £134-£188 (or approximately US$210–286) are higher departure taxes than Australia's.

Ghana's Airport Passenger Service Charge, at GH₵200 (approximately US$100) has been reclassified as a charge, not a tax, after the government announced in March 2013 the charge would be 100% hypothecated towards funding airport infrastructure.

The New Zealand government recoiled from a plan to follow Australia in imposing a departure tax. Cabinet papers show the government planned to implement a NZ$35 border charge in its May 2013 budget, but withdrew from the plan after the country’s Economic Development Ministry found the tax would have run counter to New Zealand’s tourism promotion efforts. This was particularly true of travel from Australia, the ministry's modelling found.

=== OECD ===
The PMC is the second highest departure tax among the members of the Organisation for Economic Co-operation and Development (OECD) after the United Kingdom Air Passenger Duty's long haul rates (see table). For travel of less than 3,200 km the PMC is the highest in the OECD.

Country	Tax	Rate (short haul)	Rate (long haul)
United Kingdom	Air Passenger Duty economy class	Band A (0–3220 km) reduced rate at £13 (US$20.10) for travel in lowest class or standard rate at £26 (US$40.30)	Band D (>8000 km) reduced rate at £94 (US$145.50) for travel in lowest class or standard rate at £188 (US$291)
Australia	Passenger Movement Charge	A$70	A$70
Germany	Luftverkehrsteuergesetz	Band A countries €12.88 (US$13.64)	Band B countries €32.62 (US$34.54); All other countries €58.73 (US$62.19)
Austria	Flugabgabegesetz	Band A countries €8 (US$8.80)	All other countries €35 (US$38.50)
Mexico	Derecho de No Inmigrante	Mex$294 (US$19.30)	Mex$294 (US$19.30)

=== IATA ===
The International Air Transport Association (IATA) classifies the PMC a departure tax, rather than an airport charge, because its revenue does not directly contribute to passenger processing at airports or sea ports.

In June 2013, IATA released an economic briefing showing the damage the PMC does to the Australian economy. Its analysis showed that by abolishing the A$55 charge, it would result in a 3.5% drop in average ticket price on airfares to Australia, which would result in an increase of 2.5% in international passenger traffic to Australia (based on an elasticity of demand of 0.7). It estimated the additional benefit the additional visitors would contribute to the Australian economy as A$1.7 billion. This would result in a net benefit to the Australian Treasury even accounting for revenue loss.

== See also ==
- Airport Improvement Fee
- Air Passenger Duty, United Kingdom
- German air passenger taxes
- Air Travel Tax, Ireland
- Taxation in Australia
