= Tourist tax =

Revenue-generating measure

Tourist taxes are aimed at generating revenue from tourists or the tourism industry. They are generally a way for governments to generate revenue for the consolidated fund, but can also be a hypothecated levy used to address the impacts of tourism.

The taxes can be used to mitigate the increased demand on infrastructure and public services, to address the environmental and sustainable impact of tourism and to ensure that the tax burden is split equitably. They are also used as a tool to regulate the flow and behavior of tourists, to provide funds for specific events or projects, used to promote and market the destination or used to diversify the economy of areas reliant on tourism.

The process for paying tourist taxes can either be in advance as part of the visa process or through an online portal, directly on arrival or upon hotel check-in, or included as part of a bill or airline ticket.

== Types ==
=== Hotel tax ===
The most common type of tourist tax in Europe and the United States is to levy a tax on accommodation known as a hotel tax, occupancy tax, lodging tax or bed tax. The tax is levied against individuals when they rent accommodation (a room, rooms, entire home, or other living space) in a hotel, inn, tourist home or house, motel, or other type of lodging.

In most countries the tax is levied by municipal, regional or national governments and is usually collected at the point of check-in or, in some cases, as part of the booking process. Hotel tax is paid in addition to value-added tax (VAT) and other taxes.

The implementation of the tax varies from city to city. For example, Reykjavík charges a flat rate per room per night, whereas Amsterdam charges a fixed percentage of the total accommodation cost. In Paris, a fixed fee is charged for the duration of the stay, which varies depending on accommodation's star rating. Iceland and Romania charge a fixed taxed national-wide whereas in Spain and France hotel taxes vary by municipality.

However, in many cities, non-tourists have to pay these hotel taxes meant for tourists. For example, Hawaiʻi's Transient Accommodations Tax (TAT), HB1077 HD1, means that non-tourists who might need to spend the night in a hotel nearby for medical care, or are in need of temporary housing due to an unexpected natural disaster, are affected by this hotel tax. Furthermore, the Glasgow City Council is introducing a new tourist tax in January 2027 that is £5 per night for hotels, AirBnB, hostels, etc., which they have directly stated includes anyone with a Glasgow postal code.

As of 2026, the highest hotel tax in the U.S is Chicago, Illinois which is levied at 19%. The previous highest hotel tax was Houston, Texas at 17%. The highest rate in Europe is Amsterdam, where a tax of 12.5% is due.

=== Arrival tax ===
Arrival taxes are paid by incoming visitors to a country and are collected either on entry or pre-arrival as part of the visa application process. The tax can either be a fixed fee, for example, NZ$100 for the duration of a stay in New Zealand, or US$200 per day for visitors to Bhutan (thought to be highest form of tourist tax of any kind).

In contrast to hotel taxes, which are usually charged per room, arrival taxes are levied against the individual. Some arrival taxes are not strictly tourist taxes as they can be applied to all types of passengers. Arrival taxes can vary depending on the port of entry, mode of travel, reason for travel, travel class, nationality or age.

=== Departure tax ===
Similar to arrival taxes, departure taxes are levied at the border against visitors to the country upon departure.

In 2019 Japan introduced a "Sayonara Tax" of ¥1,000 to visitors leaving the country and Indonesia charges a tourist departure tax, that differs depending on the airport.

Departure taxes can have many variable meaning passengers on the same flight can be required to pay a different level of tax depending on the travel class, final destination, type of travel, nationality or age.

Although departure taxes are usually charged to foreign tourist leaving their destination country, the Turkish Government have a departure tax only payable by Turkish citizens leaving the country for tourism or business.

Not all departure taxes are strictly tourist taxes as they can be applied to passengers irrespective of type of travel.

=== Cruise tax ===
In some jurisdictions, cruise passengers are sometimes subject to different taxes than other types of visitors.

The Netherlands has a specific cruising tax is charged for people staying onboard cruise ships docked in the country. Where as Greece has imposed a Cruise Ship Passenger Levy for cruise passengers visiting certain islands in peak periods.

However, cruise ships receive preferable tax arrangements in other ways, such as onboard restaurant and catering services not being subject to VAT in most tax jurisdictions.

=== Indirect and other forms of tourist tax ===
Tourists are subject to other taxes when visiting a country that non-tourists also have to pay. Tourists are expected to pay VAT on goods and services (although some country incentives tourist spending through tax-free shopping) as well as other forms of non-tourist specific taxes such as the universal departure taxes as is the case with the Air Passenger Duty levied against all air passengers outbound from the UK, The Air Travel Tax in Ireland and the German air passenger taxes.

There are also other instances where tourists are expected to pay a higher tax rate than non-tourists. Tourist attractions can often be priced differently for citizens than for visitors as is the case in much of Asia. Similarly, in Europe cultural sites can sometimes be cheaper or free for EU citizens and full priced for non-EU citizens.

Some countries provide a reduction in tax for tourist related services which can some times be passed on to tourists including lower level of sales tax and VAT for accommodation services, passenger transportation, restaurant and catering services with admission tickets for sporting events and some cultural services being entirely exempt.

Some activities are specifically targeted by some governments for higher rates of tourist taxes as is the case in France where skiing lifts and access to off piste skiing carries a levy. Similarly, in Korea an additional bath tax is levied against users of hot springs.

== Impact ==
Tourist taxes are primarily a way of increasing revenue for governments as with all other taxes. For example, Venice and Civita di Bagnoregio recently both began charging a €5 entry fee. In their first 11 days, the fee generated €1 million which has already been used to improve services for Venice residents.

=== Environmental impact ===
As the Venice example demonstrates, tourist taxes can be used as an effective way of addressing the impact that tourism can have on the city or region. They are increasingly implemented to manage the impacts of overtourism and the climate crisis in the areas in which tourist taxes are instituted.

New Zealand's NZ$35 Visitor Conservation and Tourism Levy, Bhutan's Sustainable Development Fee, Greece's Resilience Fee for the Climate Crisis and Bali's tourist tax are all examples of tourist taxes that are ring-fenced for sustainability initiatives. Although revenue is not ring-fenced in all areas, tourist tax income is often still used for sustainable purposes. For example, Lake Como used €350,000 from its hotel tax income to fund the city's organic waste collection and improve their lakeshore maintenance programme.

The Balearic Islands in Spain have a separate Tax for Sustainable Tourism which differs from the rest of Spain's tasa turistica. The Tax for Sustainable Tourism is specifically hypothecated managed by a special government commission for water infrastructure, cultural restoration and environmental preservation. They also took the decision in 2024 to use a portion of their tourist tax income to diversify their economy and reduce their dependency on tourism industry.

In 2002, the Balearic Islands introduced an eco-tax on tourists in the form of a bed tax, levying everyone above the age of 16 with a €1-€2 per night tax. The tax was repealed after 2 years after tourist numbers dropped by 25%.

== Implementation ==
The tourism industry is susceptible to high price elasticity meaning that small changes to tourist tax have a large impact on the demand for a particular destination when considered independently. However, the pass-through rate of tourist taxes to tourists can greatly impact the efficacy of their intended purpose when used to encourage or deter certain consumer behaviours. When tourist taxes have been reduced to incentivize tourism the impact was minimal in Portugal, where vendors only passed through 25% of the intended saving, compared to Finland which saw a large boost to its tourism industry when 100% of the VAT savings were passed through to consumers. It has also been shown that visitors to different types of destinations are more reactive to certain tax changes. Tourists to cities show more elasticity than tourists visiting beaches, for example.

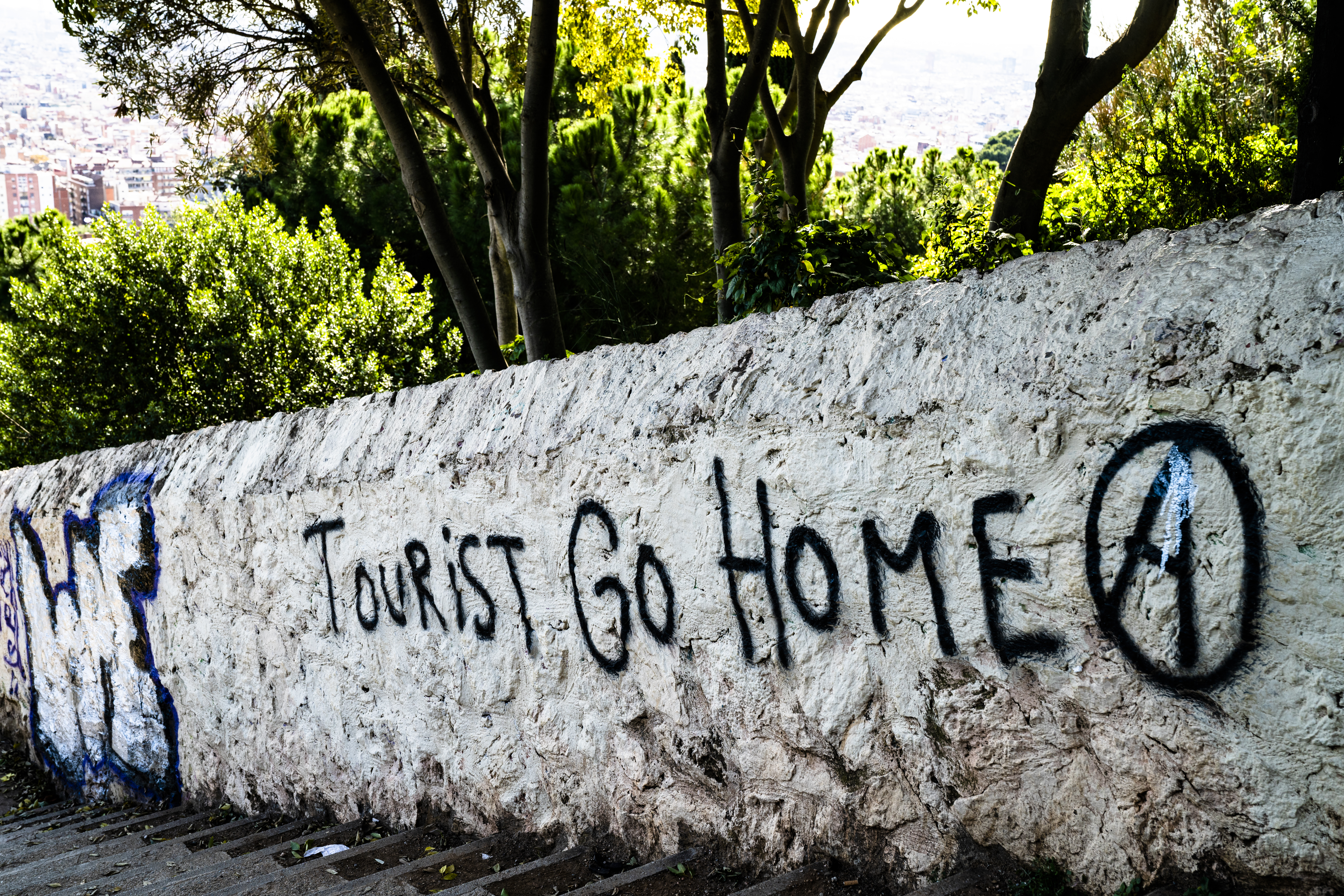
2019 graffiti in Barcelona, saying "tourist go home" followed by an anarchist A

Reactions to direct tourist taxes can sometimes be received negatively by tourists and the tourism industry both in the destination and in the countries from where tourists come. The public perceptions of these taxes have been shown to have a direct impact on tourist numbers. As mentioned, when the Balearic Islands introduced a bed tax without consultation they experienced a 25% fall in tourists. This has been attributed not only to the tax directly, but also to the reaction of travel agents moving their business elsewhere.

Various approaches can be used to target taxes more specifically such as not charging business travelers, only charging foreign nationals, varying the fee depending on the duration of the stay, differing the rates depending on mode of arrival or port of entry, or only charging a tax at peak periods.

In March 2023, in response to concerns over National Park funding cuts in the UK, ethical travel company Responsible Travel conducted a survey of 670 UK travellers to see if they would be willing to pay a levy to support nature conservation when visiting a National Park or Area of Outstanding Natural Beauty. 90% of respondents confirmed they would be happy to pay between £2 and £10 per night if proceeds were ringfenced to support local conservation projects. An approach adopted by the US National Parks.

Tourist taxes can be perceived negatively by residents of tourist locations when they do not see the tourist taxes being reinvested in the affected communities. This was the reason behind some of the protests in Barcelona and Majorca as part of the wider Spanish anti-tourism protests. Protests also arise when there is a lack of tourist taxes in some cases, for example, in the Canary Islands. A report by UN Tourism found that, when not implemented correctly, tourist taxes can have negative and unintended consequences.

UN Tourism has laid out seven principles that should be considered when designing tax policy for tourism tax. They recommend that tourist tax should be:

- Ring-fenced for general tourism promotion or for regenerative purpose.
- Locally administered to build in political support and ensure funds are allocated where needed.
- Transparent with tourists and consumers about the purposes and uses of tourist taxes
- Designed to engage communities to get the buy-in of residents, local businesses.
- Implemented with support to help local businesses comply with changes in the tax regulations and with their administrative burden.
- Monitored and evaluated to ensure the taxes are having the intended impact.
- Mindful of the burden and benefits of tourism. Understanding the economic benefits of tourism while addressing the burden tourism places on the environment and local community.

== See also ==
- Discrimination based on nationality
