= Airport tax =

Airport tax may refer to:

- Airport improvement fee, charged by some airports to fund expansion projects
- Landing fee, charged by most international airports per landed aircraft, and usually paid by the passengers as part of the price of the tickets
