= Overselling =

Sale of a commodity or service in excess quantity

Overselling or overbooking is sale of a volatile good or service in excess of actual supply. Overselling is a common practice in the travel and hospitality sectors, in which it is expected that some people will cancel. The practice occurs as an intentional business strategy in which sellers expect that some buyers will not consume all of the resources they are entitled to, or that some buyers will cancel. The practice of overselling aims to ensure that 100% of available supply will be used, resulting in the maximum return on investment. If more customers than the seller expects do wish to purchase or use the sold commodity, it may leave some customers lacking a service they expected to receive.

Overbooking is regulated (though rarely prohibited) in many countries and industries, and companies that do practice it are often required or forced by market competition to offer large amounts of compensation to customers as an incentive for them to not take up their purchase.

An alternative to overbooking is discouraging consumers from buying services they do not actually intend to use. This can be done by making reservations non-refundable, a common practice among low-cost carriers and railways, or requiring customers wishing to cancel their right to a service to pay a termination fee.

== Tourism industry ==
An airline, rail or shipping company may book more customers onto an aircraft, train or cruise ship than can actually be accommodated. This allows them to have a (nearly) full vehicle on most runs, even if some customers miss the trip (tickets are often rebookable afterward). Such customers are called no-shows. If everyone shows up, at least in the case of airlines, the overbooking will cause an oversale.

=== Airlines ===
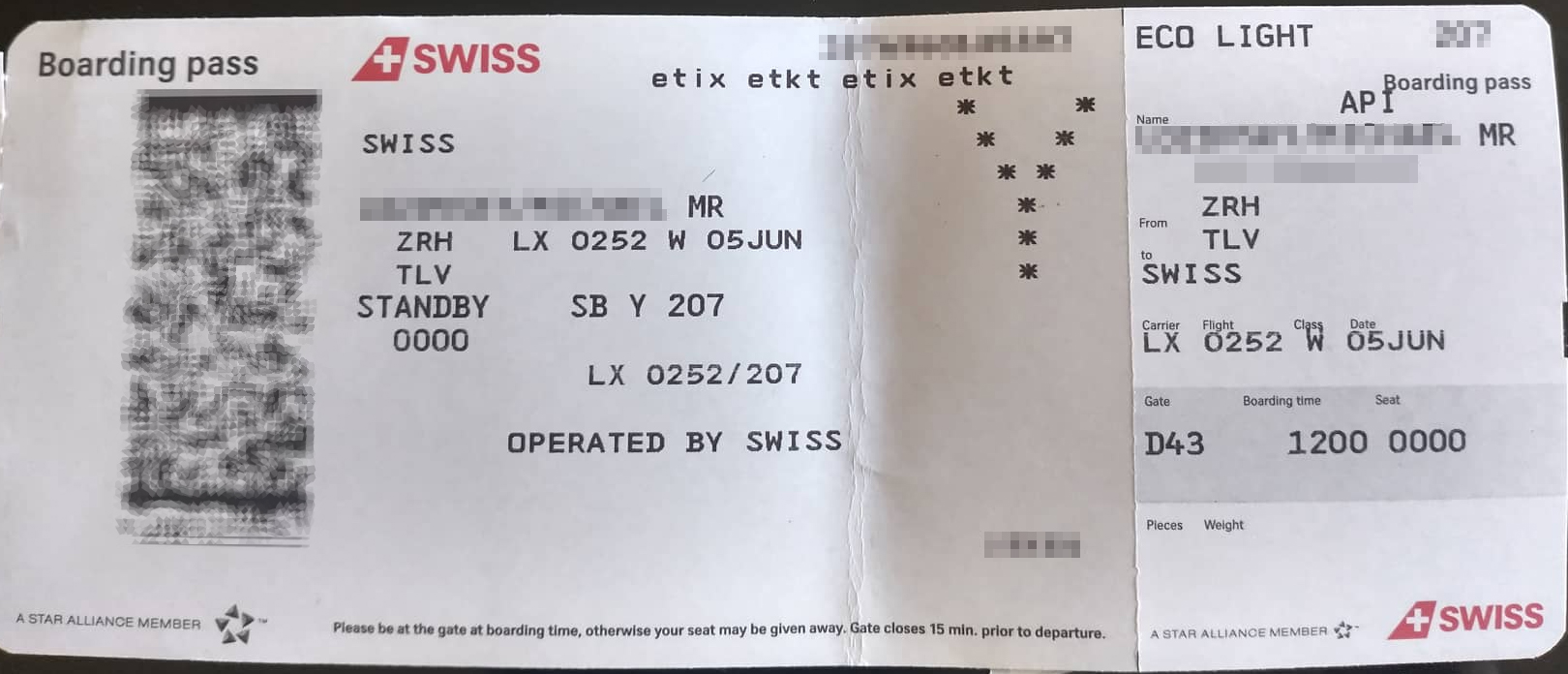
Boarding pass for an overbooked flight by Swiss International Air Lines, with no seat assignment provided

When a flight is oversold, the airline prevents some passengers from boarding, even though they have purchased a ticket. This is called "bumping". Airlines may ask for volunteers to give away their seats, or refuse boarding to certain passengers, in exchange for compensation that may include cash, an additional free ticket and/or an upgrade on a later flight. They can do this and still make more money than if they booked only to the plane's capacity and had it take off with empty seats.

As of 2018, 351,904 passengers of the 17 major U.S. airlines were bumped annually, among them 10,938 involuntarily. This figure covers only flights originating in the U.S., including both domestic and international destinations.

Overbooking is one of the tactics used by airlines to reduce their loss caused by no-shows; other tactics include requiring all passengers to reconfirm, or charging no-show penalty fees.

A few airline frequent flyer programs actually allow a customer the privilege of flying an already overbooked flight; another customer will be asked to leave. Often, only economy class is overbooked while higher classes are not, allowing the airline to upgrade some passengers to otherwise unused seats while providing assurance to higher paying customers.

In the EU since 2005, as of 2021, Regulation 261/2004 requires airlines to first appeal for passengers to voluntarily release their seat, maybe by giving an offer of compensation but its amount is not regulated. If volunteers are insufficient, airlines will then refuse some passengers the right to board, in which case Regulation 261/2004 sets out compensation requirements for airlines that deny boarding to passengers due to overbooking. Regulation 261/2004 does not mention the fate of passengers who failed to reconfirm and have been denied boarding.

In the U.S. since 1978, as of 2021, CFR Title 14 Part 250 requires airlines to first appeal for passengers to voluntarily release their seat. The amount of compensation is not regulated. If volunteers are insufficient, airlines will then refuse some passengers the right to board. In such case, since 1968, Part 250 defines minimum compensation that must be paid. Passengers who fail to reconfirm do not receive this compensation.

==== Specific cases ====
In 2007, Air Deccan, the Indian low-cost airline was found by Directorate General of Civil Aviation to overbook even when they weren't permitted to do so. They were accused of cheating passengers by tagging the confirmed tickets as no show for compensating the additional seats. The airline pocketed all the money made by overbooking, minus airport tax, without offering a later flight for overbooked customers. The passengers that arrive last, either on time or even a minute late, become the target.

In 2011, Delta Air Lines began a practice in which they overbook some flights, using algorithms to determine how many seats to overbook based on historical data, and allow passengers checking in for the overbooked flight to state the value of travel vouchers they would be willing to accept in exchange for taking a later flight. The airline then selects the passengers who will be bumped to a later flight based on the lowest bids. According to the airline, the biggest cost saving from the practice is that it improves on-time flight departures, since gate attendants are not burdened with negotiating with passengers that are considering being bumped from the flight. Among the three major U.S. carriers, Delta had the highest rate of total bumped passengers (96 per 100,000 passengers vs. 95 on United Airlines and 50 on American Airlines), but the lowest rate of involuntarily bumped passengers (3 per 100,000 vs. 5 on American and 11 on United).

In the past some airlines, like JetBlue Airways, did not overbook as a policy that provides incentive and avoids customer disappointment. They were able to do this and remain profitable as the majority of their customers are tourists, instead of business fliers, and their tickets are non-refundable, thereby lowering the chances of passengers missing their flights. Since 2017 JetBlue again began overbooking flights.

In early April 2017, severe weather on the East Coast of the United States caused many flight cancellations, with Delta having more than 3,200 cancellations in a five-day period. Due to the large number of stranded passengers trying to board flights, many were far overbooked, resulting in Delta paying out unusually high-priced vouchers, with one group of three passengers being paid over $11,000 over a weekend of delays as a result of the overbooking.

==== Involuntary deboarding ====
External videos
- Footage of the United Airlines passenger being forcibly removed from their seat and removed from flight, video on Twitter

On April 9, 2017, the continued problems from overbooking received media coverage when a man was forcibly removed by law enforcement officers from an overbooked United Airlines flight. After the plane fully boarded, according to reports, the airline asked for four passengers to volunteer their seats in exchange for $800 vouchers so four United crew members could board. After no passengers on the flight voluntarily stepped forward, the airline announced that they would select four passengers at random to be removed from the overbooked flight. One of the men selected to be removed refused, telling the United crew member that he was a doctor who needed to see patients the following morning, prompting the airline to call security. As seen in videos filmed by other passengers, the man was forcefully pulled from his seat, knocked unconscious and had his bloodied, limp body dragged down the aisle to the exit.

On April 11, United said that Flight 3411 was not overbooked, but rather sold out – contrary to their earlier statement, and a definition which differs from IATA's.

=== Rail ===
Rail networks do not often overbook reserved seats. With many networks, including the UK and French systems, a contrast is offered between advance-purchase tickets, which do guarantee a (specific) seat and are therefore often non-refundable, and "walk-on" tickets purchased on the day of travel, which do not; these passengers may be forced to stand or take a tip-up seat in a vestibule. Rail networks face less pressure in this than airlines, which cannot allow passengers to stand. Rail networks accordingly often do not have a centralised booking system; as passengers can stand, tickets can be sold from automated machines and clerks with no knowledge of how many people intend to board a train. In addition, rail networks have to deal with the unpredictable nature of season ticket holders, who have purchased a right to make unlimited use of a route; these passengers may often be allowed to join any train but not guaranteed a seat.

=== Hotels ===
During times of high demand, hotels also practice overbooking and apply similar procedures to that of the airlines, in which a service equal to or greater than that which was booked must be provided to the customer. Most states have laws requiring accommodation to be provided at an alternate hotel, referred to in hotel terminology as a "walk in". In the event that a hotel is overbooked resulting in no rooms remaining available, hotel management will often "walk" the customer to a neighboring hotel at an equal or complementary rate depending on the situation; hotels often maintain agreements with neighboring or competitor hotels for this purpose.

Some hotels have specific company policies which determine which customers will be "walked" in order of priority. Often customers who belong to the highest tier level of the hotel's loyalty program or are considered a VIP guest will likely not be walked or would be the last to be walked in an extreme situation. Customers with third-party reservations that were not made directly with the hotel or first-time customers with a discounted rate may be at a higher risk of being walked.

== Manufacturing ==
=== Aircraft manufacturers ===
Both Airbus and Boeing are known to overbook their backlog of aircraft orders, and both use internal algorithms to estimate how many airlines will defer or cancel their aircraft orders, so as to maintain a steady production rate.

== Telecommunications ==
=== Telephone networks ===
Building for typical rather than peak demand is considerably less expensive, but a telephone company can experience problems when large numbers of callers attempt to use the system at the same time. This generally only happens in exceptional circumstances such as a disaster or national emergency, but can result in some calls not going through at all. The United States has the Government Emergency Telecommunications Service and Nationwide Wireless Priority Service, and the United Kingdom (UK) has the Government Telephone Preference Scheme and ACCOLC, to allow official calls to go through reliably in emergencies.

=== Communications access networks (last-mile) ===
In a communications system in which multiple users share a common resource, oversubscription refers to the ratio of the allocated bandwidth per user to the guaranteed bandwidth per user. Underlying the oversubscription model is the fact that statistically few users will attempt to utilize their allocated bandwidth simultaneously. Calculation and management of oversubscription ratios is common in the CATV industry.

In a cable network utilizing DOCSIS 1.1, for example, the full 38 Mbit/s download bandwidth is typically shared by some 500 subscribers, each of which may be allocated 7 Mbit/s. Calculating the guaranteed bandwidth per subscriber in this case is accomplished by dividing the maximum total bandwidth of 38 Mbit/s by 500, the maximum number of simultaneous users. The advertised peak bandwidth per user of 7 Mbit/s is 92 times the guaranteed bandwidth per user of 0.076 Mbit/s. In this example, the download oversubscription ratio is 92:1.

A similar calculation can be performed using upstream bandwidths. Typically, advertised upload rates are 1/4 the download rates. The available upload bandwidth using DOCSIS 1.1 or 2.0 is lower. If 100 users allocated 1.75 Mbit/s of upload bandwidth share a single DOCSIS 1.1 upstream, the upload oversubscription ratio is 17:1. One article found a typical DOCSIS download oversubscription ratio to be 28.125:1, while a best case oversubscription may be 12:1.

Oversubscription is not the same as overselling, provided that the oversubscription ratio, for a given number of subscribers traffic, which is multiplexed over time, does not significantly impact performance. A significant impact to performance might be one in which the performance of the oversubscribed portion of the network is less than that of the end to end service that the subscriber is using. In other words, oversubscription works because not everyone uses it at the same time. Oversubscription is the basis for all non-dedicated telecommunications services. Even if a subscriber had a dedicated access network, that network is still oversubscribed against many others with respect to Internet access for example. The same is true in telephony and in wireless.

It is not economically practical, environmentally reasonable, or technically feasible to provide dedicated access for every service to every customer. A well-engineered oversubscribed service appears to function as a dedicated service to a subscriber. Another way of saying this is that a good engineer designs the oversubscription in a way that makes the service appear to be a dedicated service for that customer. That means no dropped calls on your cell phone, no busy signals when dialing, and no failed downloads on the Internet (for example).

G-PON and XG-PON access networks are typically oversubscribed, with typical load-factors of approaching 256:1, due its point-to-multipoint architecture.

=== Internet ===
ISPs regularly sell more bandwidth or connectivity than they have. When Internet bandwidth becomes overused, all customers' service tends to be degraded without necessarily failing completely.

=== Web hosting ===
In the web hosting industry, the term overselling describes a situation in which a company provides hosting plans that are unsustainable if every one of its customers uses the full extent of services advertised. The term is usually referred to the web space and bandwidth transfer allowance. A hosting company may offer unlimited space and unlimited bandwidth and restrict other metrics, such as CPU usage or inode limit. They may have onerous restrictions and one-sided contracts that let them cancel the hosting of anybody that puts a strain on their system or fully uses their claimed allotments.

This practice usually incurs little ill-effect, since most customers do not use any substantial portion of their allocated share. If a customer has a small, low-traffic site serving static HTML pages, few resources will be used. If, however, a customer wishes to run a high-traffic, professional or business website, an oversold hosting account can be detrimental. In these cases, a shared hosting provider that does not oversell, a virtual private server or a dedicated server is a preferred option.

== Solutions ==
In the transportation area, a company can increase the number of flights on routes, add more cars or carriages to a train, move to a larger ship or add ships or containers to a cargo transport. In the telecommunications industry, a common carrier may be able to solve an overbooking problem by adding bandwidth—by adding lines to an existing system, reconfiguring existing lines, upgrading existing lines to a higher-speed line or a greater number of time-multiplexed lines, or some other scheme to add bandwidth. In the hotel industry, while revenue management teams commonly practice overbooking, they also work to ensure that hotels are not excessively overbooked, which could result in negative brand perception and loss of profit.

== See also ==
- Breach of contract, a general term for when a party to a contract fails to satisfy a term of the agreement.
