= Departure tax =

Fee charged by a country when a person is leaving it

A departure tax is a fee charged (under various names) by a country when a person is leaving the country.

== Background ==
Some countries charge a departure tax only when a person is leaving by air. In these cases, the departure tax can be de facto the same as the air passenger tax, although the latter can also apply to domestic flights that are therefore not departure taxes, as no international borders are crossed.

Various rules apply to the purchase and payment of the tax, including payment at the airport to those about to catch a flight (sometimes only in the local currency and sometimes by credit card), or by some prepayment method, or it may be charged to the airlines and included in the airline ticket price.

== Departure taxes of various countries ==
Air passenger taxes in Europe. Has air passenger taxes Will introduce air passenger taxes No taxes, but supports EU-wide taxes No longer has air passenger taxes No air passenger taxes

Country	Local currency	Notes
Australia	A$70 (US$52.63)	The Passenger Movement Charge is included in the ticket price.
Austria	€12 (US$14.19)	Domestic flights like short distance, but including value added tax. Tax levied through carrier of flight. Since 1 September 2020 tax depending on distance system is abolished and a flat rate is applied. Information based on Flugabgabegesetz (FlugAbgG).
Bangladesh	৳500 (US$5.88)	Charges at land border exits. Must be paid in cash (taka) at any branch of Sonali Bank; a bank booth is available at all land exits.
Brunei	B$5 (US$3.73)	If the final destination is not Indonesia, Malaysia or the Philippines, then the tax is BN$12. If transiting through one of these countries, the higher tax rate still applies, even if the initial flight destination is located in Indonesia, Malaysia or the Philippines. Paid in cash at check-in.
Bermuda	US$35	Although the passenger departure tax in Bermuda is levied to the owner of Airline for every departing passenger, this is squarely passed on to the passenger as part of the overall ticket fare. There are exceptions in case of children under 2 years, transit passengers and in some other cases. A tax of $35 is charged for every departing passenger. Also a Yacht arrival Tax in Bermuda is charged to the owner of the arriving yacht. Presently $35 is charged for each passenger arriving by the yacht.
Belize	Land Borders Foreign Nationals: BZ$40 (US$20) Belizean Nationals: BZ$0; Airports; Foreign Nationals: BZ$75 (US$37.5) Belizean Nationals: BZ$35 (US$17.5)	
Canada	CA$0 to CA$40 (US$0 to US$32)	Departure tax is in the form of an Airport Improvement Fee [AIF] and is added to the cost of the ticket. Ranges from $0–40 depending on the Canadian airport that you depart from.
Cambodia	US$25	Included in airline tickets as of 2011
China	CN¥ 90 (US$13.95)	Charged to all visitors leaving by air. Fees are included in airline tickets.
Costa Rica	₡14,500 (US$23.36)	Charged to all visitors leaving by air. Must be paid in cash (US dollars or colones), or is charged as a cash advance on a credit card. Departure taxes are included in most air ticket prices, depending on which airline.
Cuba	$MN25 (US$3.75)	Included in air ticket price since April 2015
Dominican Republic	RD$884.595 (US$15.46)	Paid in cash upon departure. Departure taxes are included in most air ticket prices, depending on which airline.
Ecuador	US$27.15 (US$40.8 from Quito airport)	Included in air ticket price.
Egypt	E£410 (US$26.21)	Charged to all visitors leaving by air starting from November 2019.
Fiji	FJ$100 (US$48.31)	Included in air ticket price
Germany	€12.88 (US$15.23) (band A countries) / €32.62 (US$38.58)(band B countries) /€58.73 (US$69.46) all other countries	for more details on Luftverkehrsteuergesetz (LuftVStG) see German air passenger taxes
Guyana	GY$4,000 (US$19.18)	Payable at the airport on departure.
Honduras	L 700 (US$29.14)	Only applies to air. Small land departure tax.
Hong Kong	HK$120 (US$15.44) by air HK$18 (US$2.32) by ferry	Included in tickets. Refundable in some cases.
Iran	1st departure: ﷼9,000,000 2nd: ﷼15,000,000; 3rd: ﷼22,000,000	Only applies to Iranian citizens and should be paid at the airports or Melli bank branches. The amount is incremental and depends on the number of departures in a solar year. Religious travels are taxed much less on second and third (and more) departures.
Jamaica	US$35	Effective June 1, 2016
Japan	¥1,000 (US$9.11)	Effective Jan 7, 2019. Departure tax is charged to each passenger leaving the country by aircraft or ferry regardless of nationality
Lebanon	Economy Class: ل.ل 50,000 (US$33.17); Business Class: ل.ل 110,000 (US$72.97); First Class: ل.ل 150,000 (US$99.5)	From 22 August 2017 (Economy class tax was planned to be increased to 60,000 LBP but it was decided to keep it at 50,000 LBP)
Malaysia	Within ASEAN; Economy Class – RM8 (US$1.93); Other Classes – RM50 (US$12.08) Outside ASEAN; Economy Class – RM20 (US$4.83); Other Classes – RM20 (US$4.83)	Applies to international departures by air. Exemptions on Effective 1 September 2019. Exemptions: Babies or toddlers under the age of 24-months; Passengers on transits not exceeding 12 hours
Mexico	Mex$1,160 (US$57.23)	All non-Mexican nationals must pay this fee, except those who have permanent resident status or who are connecting flights
Netherlands	€29.4 (US$34.77)	The air passenger tax rate for 2025, per passenger per flight.
Panama	US$40	Charged to all visitors leaving by air. Included in airfare.
Peru	US$30.75	This is for travel to the United States. There are different fees for travel to other places.
Philippines	Full travel tax Economy class – ₱1,620 (US$32.89) First class – ₱2,700 (US$54.82) Standard Reduced travel tax Economy class – ₱810 (US$16.45) First class – ₱1,350 (US$27.41) Privileged Reduced travel tax Economy class– ₱300 (US$6.09) First class – ₱400 (US$8.12)	To be paid in cash (peso or dollars) before departure. Travel tax can be paid through partner airlines; travel tax centers at airports, travel tax offices and satellite offices; or online. Full travel tax Filipino citizens Non-immigrant foreign passport holders who have stayed in the Philippines for more than one year) Standard Reduced travel tax Minors (from 2 years and one day to 12th birthday on date of travel) Accredited Filipino journalist whose travel is in pursuit of journalistic assignment Those authorized by the President of the Republic of the Philippines for reasons of national interest Privileged Reduced travel tax Legitimate spouse of an Overseas Filipino Worker (OFW) Legitimate and unmarried children of an OFW below 21 years of age
Samoa	WS$65 (US$25.39)	Departure tax is included in airfare.
Saudi Arabia	ر.س 165 (US$44)	Departure tax is included in airfare
Sri Lanka	රු.193,080 (US$970.84)	Departure tax is applicable to all departures from Sri Lanka. An additional $60 is charged for trips starting in Sri Lanka if the ticket is issued overseas. Taxes are included in the air fare.
Sweden	European destinations – kr 61 (US$7.11) Medium range destinations – kr 255 (US$29.72) Long range destinations – kr 408 (US$47.55)	As of 1 April 2018 the Departure tax aka the Swedish Aviation Tax is levied on commercial flights carrying passengers and departing from a Swedish airport. European destinations means inside Europe including domestic journeys. Medium range includes for example Saudiarabia, Iran and United States, while Long range are more distant destinations.
Thailand	฿700 (US$21.89)	Included in airline tickets as of 2007.
Tunisia	د.ت 60 (US$21.51)	Some people are exempted from paying this tax.
Turkey	₺1,250 (US$28.19)	Only applies to Turkish citizens. May be paid at airports or via online tax payment systems of the Turkish Revenue Administration and/or of the contracted banks. Children younger than 7, citizens with resident permits in other countries (RU work permit accepted too), and crew members of any commercial road transport, rail transport, ship transport, and aviation vehicles are exempt from payment.
United Kingdom	Between £13 (band A, lowest class) and £194 (band D, any other class) (US$17.81-US$265.75)	Varies according to the distance traveled and passenger class. See Air Passenger Duty.

== See also ==
- Expatriation tax
- Diploma tax
