= No-show =

No show or no-show or No Show may refer to:

- No show, failure to turn up for a performance
- No-show (airlines), clause of some airlines' terms of service
- No-show (professional wrestling), when a wrestler does not show up for a match
- No-show job, a job for which no work, or even attendance, is expected
- "No Show", the forty-first episode of the HBO television series The Sopranos
- "No Shows", a 2014 song by Gerard Way
- "No Show", a 2011 song by Regurgitator
