= No-show (airlines) =

Clause of some airlines' terms of service

A no-show is a condition when a person does not appear at their expected place. In aviation, no-show is when a ticketed passenger doesn't show up for their flight. Such passenger is also sometimes called a "no-show".

Airlines attempt to reduce losses caused by no-shows by employing tactics such as overbooking, reconfirmation, and no-show penalty charges. The U.S. government warns consumers to not be a no-show.

Some airlines include a no-show clause in their Contract of carriage. It basically means that a user not showing up for the outbound flight will be considered a no-show, and all the connecting flights associated with this one, even a return flight, will be cancelled and no refund will apply.

This is an example of no-show clause in the terms of use of Swiss International Air Lines (SWISS):

No-shows occur when the Travel Agent fails to cancel a booking that is not required by the customer which leads to inventory spoilage. If the reservation is not cancelled it may result in a No-show rebooking/refund restrictions may apply for no-show after ticketing. Un-ticketed segments which result in No-Show shall be liable to penalty fees.

While it is not clear if carriers should refund users regarding navigation taxes (related to the airline operation and to the governments, which do not appear on a ticket), other expenses, like security, air passenger duty, and noise/environmental can all be refunded, as these all relate to the passenger's use of any particular airport to depart/arrive on any particular flight.

This clause has raised much concern among users, and court rulings have converged to the conclusion that "carriers cannot force passengers to fly".

Often no-shows are treated the same way regardless of reason. This means that a passenger who is delayed by a problem during the travel to airport will get the return flight cancelled even if wanting to rebook the outbound flight at the airport.
