= MTPAS =

MTPAS (Mobile Telecommunication Privileged Access Scheme) is a procedure in the UK for prioritising access to the mobile telephone networks for privileged persons (members of emergency services as designated at a local level). It replaced ACCOLC in 2009.

MTPAS is only available to Category 1 and 2 Responders (as defined in the Civil Contingencies Act 2004) and partner organisations which directly support them at the scene of an emergency incident. Using an agreed protocol, the Police Gold Commander, in charge of the response to a major incident, notifies all network operators that a major incident has been declared and activation is then their responsibility.

As a result of the incident, mobile telecommunications networks may experience an abnormally high concentration of calls. If networks become congested, handsets installed with a privileged access SIM will stand a much higher likelihood of being able to connect to their network and make calls than other customers.

== How it works ==
Mobile telephones work on a cell basis. In the United Kingdom, for example, the cells adjacent to the incident are identified and MTPAS is activated on those cells alone. MTPAS-aware telephones are allowed access to the network and all other users will receive a fast beep (called a fast busy signal). Once the call is connected to the network it is routed like any other. If the user receives a recording that all lines are busy or engaged tone, then either MTPAS users are overloading the available capacity or MTPAS is not being utilised.

The MTPAS access class may be indicated on the SIM card, or in protected storage on the handset itself, by a set of numbers in the range 0 - 15, giving a total of 16 flag bits in the Access Control Class Elementary File (EFACC) in a USIM. For instance, if the 16-bit control word is 1010-0000-0011-1111, only phones with the MTPAS access levels of 1, 3, 11, 12, 13, 14, 15 & 16 will grant requests for placing a call. This scheme is not hierarchical, so it can allow level 1 access while disallowing level 6 access. The cell broadcasts the Access Control Classes it allows (or bars) in a System Information Block (SIB) message. The decision whether to permit a call is not made by the cellular network but by the handset itself. In Britain, ordinary cellphone users have numbers in the range 0 - 9. Higher priority users are allocated numbers 12–14. During an emergency, some or all access classes in the range 0 - 9 are disabled. If the overload condition continues, mobiles with access classes level 10, 11, then 12 and so on may also be disabled by the cellular network operator. In the United States, Verizon Wireless uses access classes 0-1 for emergency as well as Government-privileged use.

As MTPAS would be a frustration to normal network users in case of network overload, in Britain it is normally only initiated when authorized by a British police "gold" commander (major incident control is named in three tiers in the UK, gold, silver and bronze, in accordance with the London Emergency Services Liaison Panel, a group responsible for creating best-agreed procedures for dealing with various emergency situations) after consideration with the co-ordinating group. The police gold commander will speak to dedicated staff at the mobile network operator, and this will be followed up by a specially designed fax message, in accordance with the Home Office document "Process for the Management of the Mobile Telecommunications Privileged Access Scheme (MTPAS)".

The police gold commander's proforma fax reads: "This message serves to advise you that a Strategic Command Group (SCG) is being established in response to a major incident in the UK. As a result of the incident, your network may experience an abnormally high concentration of calls. If your network becomes congested, your assistance is requested to provide customers with SIMs allocated to classes 12, 13 and 14 a much higher likelihood of being able to make calls than customers allocated to other classes.", and gives space for the police to identify the geographic location of the incident.

Not all calling by regular mobiles is prevented. Calls to an emergency services number (911, 112, 999) will ignore all MTPAS or global action messages.

== See also ==
- Government Telephone Preference Scheme
