= Solidarity tax on airplane tickets =

Tax to support disease treatment

The solidarity tax on airplane tickets (Taxe de solidarité sur les billets d'avion, also known as Chirac Tax) is a surcharge on the civil aviation tax which is destined to finance Unitaid. This tax was initially proposed by Presidents Jacques Chirac of France and Luiz Inácio Lula da Silva of Brazil. It was initially adopted by five founding countries (France, Brazil, United Kingdom, Norway and Chile) during a conference in Paris on September 14, 2005. Nine countries actually implemented this tax: Cameroon, Chile, Congo, France, Madagascar, Mali, Mauritius, Niger and the Republic of Korea. Norway also contributes through its tax on CO_{2} emissions.

== History ==
The tax was first proposed by French president Jacques Chirac and his Brazilian counterpart Luiz Inácio Lula da Silva. It was later adopted by five countries at the Ministerial conference on innovative development finance held in Paris in February 2005.

On 19 October 2019, the National Assembly adopted the first draft of the 2020 Budget which contained a provision instituting an additional contribution on air travel starting on 1 January 2020. This additional contribution is expected to yield €180,000,000 in yearly revenues which will be attributed to the AFITF to fund public transport projects.

== Details ==
The tax is applied selectively depending on the final destination. Transit passengers are exempt under the following conditions;

- The arrival and departure are from the same airport
- Maximum of 24 hours between arrival and departure
- The final destination is not the same as the airport of origin

The tax depends on the destination, either European Economic Area or outside EEA.

Solidarity tax on airplane tickets amounts since its inception
Starting on	Destination within EEA or Switzerland		Destination outside EEA		Reference
Starting on	Economy Class	Business or First Class	Economy Class	Business or First Class	Reference
1 July 2006	€1	€10	€4	€40	
1 April 2014	€1.13	€11.27	€4.51	€45.07	
1 January 2020	€2.63	€20.27	€7.51	€63.07	-

From March 1, 2025, in application of article 30 of the finance law for 2025, the amounts of the solidarity rates for the tax on air passenger transport are the following:
Starting on	FINALE DESTINATION	SERVICE CATEGORY	Fee (€)
1 March 2025	European or similar destination	Normal	€7.40
1 March 2025	European or similar destination	With additional services	€30
1 March 2025	European or similar destination	Business aircraft with turboprop	€210
1 March 2025	European or similar destination	Business aircraft with turbojet	€420
1 March 2025	Intermediate destination	Normal	€15
1 March 2025	Intermediate destination	With additional services	€80
1 March 2025	Intermediate destination	Business aircraft with turboprop	€675
1 March 2025	Intermediate destination	Business aircraft with turbojet	€1015
1 March 2025	Distant destination	Normal	€40
1 March 2025	Distant destination	With additional services	€120
1 March 2025	Distant destination	Business aircraft with turboprop	€1025
1 March 2025	Distant destination	Business aircraft with turbojet	€2100

The tax raises approximately 160 million per year and since its introduction has raised over 1 billion.

== See also ==
- Air Passenger Duty
- German air passenger taxes
