= Reconfirmation =

Contractual requirement in the tourism industry

In tourism, reconfirmation is a contractual requirement that the traveller must explicitly re-notify to the seller that they still intend to use their reservation. If the traveller fails to reconfirm, their reservation might be cancelled. The term is mostly used in commercial aviation.

== Airlines ==
Several airlines require the traveller to perform reconfirmation procedures, even though the airline ticket has already been reserved, paid, confirmed, issued, partially checked-in and flown. A typical reconfirmation rule is: for each flight (or more precisely, a "leg") within the trip, the traveller must explicitly re-notify ("reconfirm") to the airline, by telephone or at the airlines' counter, that the traveller still intends to take the reserved flight. The call must be done within a determined range of time in advance of the flight. Example deadlines are: 6 to 72 hours. The earliest acceptable timing is not mentioned, but merely checking-in the previous part of the trip does not count as a reconfirmation for the latter part. If the traveller fails to reconfirm their flight reservation, the airline may cancel it. This also means that if the traveller is forcefully deboarded ("involuntary deboarding", or "bumping", in jargon) from a flight because of the airline's overbooking, the traveller can not receive the standard compensation.

The reconfirmation rule is an attempt to reduce no-shows. Airlines tried several penalties such as reconfirmation, and no-show penalty charges. The reconfirmation system began in 1952. It was hated from the beginning, and the policy was frequently revised and inconsistent.

During the 1970s, travellers were strongly advised to reconfirm, as cancellations actually happened, even on domestic flights. Since the 1990s, some guidebooks told that domestic flights do not need reconfirmation. By 2000, there was a notion that reconfirmation became something of the past, and travellers who actually did reconfirm may have decreased. However, as of 2021, it is still allowed to mandate reconfirmation, so the risk of being cancelled remains.

Each airline has different reconfirmation policies, which are stated in their Contract of carriage. For a ticket that contains multiple flights operated by different airlines, one flight may not require reconfirmation, yet others may do. Each airline and each flight have different rules.

- Delta Air Lines: As of 2021, "reconfirmation" is mentioned in their Contracts of carriage.
- American Airlines: As of 2021, "reconfirmation" is mentioned in their Contracts of carriage.
- Lufthansa: As of 2021, Lufthansa flights do not need reconfirmation.
- United Airlines: As of 2021, "reconfirmation" is mentioned in their Contracts of carriage.
- Airlines which explicitly mandate reconfirmation: Ethiopian Airlines, Kenya Airways
- British Airways: as of 2025, "reconfirmation" is mentioned in their General Conditions of Carriage
