= List of acts of the Northern Ireland Assembly from 2012 =

This is a list of acts of the Northern Ireland Assembly passed in 2012. Acts of the Northern Ireland Assembly are enacted by the Northern Ireland Assembly, which has legislative authority over devolved matters in relation to Northern Ireland under the authority of the Northern Ireland Act 1998. Acts are cited by calendar year, in the same fashion as acts of Parliament of the United Kingdom. Each act passed in a respective year is given a chapter number (abbreviated "c.") denoted by Arabic numerals, and citations are usually followed by the suffix "(N.I.)" so as to prevent confusion with acts of Parliament of the United Kingdom.

5 acts of the Northern Ireland Assembly were passed in 2012.

indicates that an act has been transcribed on Wikisource, indicates that an act is available to view at legislation.gov.uk, and indicates the location of the original act in the Parliamentary Archives.

== Acts of the Northern Ireland Assembly ==
Short title	Citation	Royal assent
Long title
Rates (Amendment) Act (Northern Ireland) 2012	2012 c. 1 (N.I.)	28 February 2012
An Act to amend the Rates (Northern Ireland) Order 1977. (Note: Rates (Northern Ireland) Order 1977 (SI 1977/2157))
Budget Act (Northern Ireland) 2012 (repealed)	2012 c. 2 (N.I.)	20 March 2012
An Act to authorise the issue out of the Consolidated Fund of certain sums for the service of the years ending 31st March 2012 and 2013; to appropriate those sums for specified purposes; to authorise the Department of Finance and Personnel to borrow on the credit of the appropriated sums; to authorise the use for the public service of certain resources for the years ending 31st March 2012 and 2013; and to revise the limits on the use of certain accruing resources in the year ending 31st March 2012. (Repealed by Budget (No. 2) Act (Northern Ireland) 2015 (c. 7 (N.I.)))
Pensions Act (Northern Ireland) 2012	2012 c. 3 (N.I.)	1 June 2012
An Act to make provision relating to pensions; and for connected purposes.
Budget (No. 2) Act (Northern Ireland) 2012 (repealed)	2012 c. 4 (N.I.)	20 July 2012
An Act to authorise the issue out of the Consolidated Fund of certain sums for the service of the year ending 31st March 2013; to appropriate those sums for specified purposes; to authorise the Department of Finance and Personnel to borrow on the credit of the appropriated sums; to authorise the use for the public service of certain resources (including accruing resources) for the year ending 31st March 2013; to authorise the use for the public service of excess resources for the year ending 31st March 2011; and to repeal certain spent provisions. (Repealed by Budget (No. 2) Act (Northern Ireland) 2015 (c. 7 (N.I.)))
Air Passenger Duty (Setting of Rate) Act (Northern Ireland) 2012	2012 c. 5 (N.I.)	11 December 2012
An Act to set the rate of air passenger duty for the purposes of section 30A(3) to (5A) of the Finance Act 1994. (Note: Finance Act 1994 (c. 9))
