= Miscellaneous charges order =

IATA documentation

A miscellaneous charges order (MCO), also known as miscellaneous purpose document (MPD), is an accountable IATA document, similar to an old-style airline ticket, used to process the payment of travel arrangements. They are issued by airlines, but normally pay for services other than airfares. An MCO may be used to purchase most services offered by airlines, hotels and tour operators.

== Coupons ==
In common with older airline tickets, MCOs had a number of passenger coupons, (typically 1, 2 or 4), as well as valueless coupons for the agency's records and the airlines' interline clearing house.

There were two main types of MCO, those with a specific value for each coupon, and those with the residual value moving to the next coupon. These were often used where the cost of a service would not be known in advance – such as paying for excess baggage.

Typically the passengers' copies on the second type would not show any value, allowing payment for inclusive tours without the services' prices being known to the passenger.

== MCO issue ==
Travel agency MCOs were printed blank without airline information, and were endorsed to the airline providing the service (or its local agent if the airline was not represented locally). Like tickets, they were valid for a maximum of one year unless otherwise endorsed for a shorter time.

== Future usage ==
As most MCOs are now issued electronically like e-tickets, they are sometimes referred to as vMCOs (virtual Miscellaneous Charges Order). MCO's are being phased out and replaced with Electronic Miscellaneous Documents.
