= Government Telephone Preference Scheme =

Call prioritisation in UK emergencies

The Government Telephone Preference Scheme (GTPS) was a British system for limiting outgoing calls from landlines if the network was overloaded during an emergency. Numbers registered under the GTPS were still be able to make outgoing calls if the service was limited. All telephones were still be able to receive calls. The scheme was decommissioned in 2017.

There were three categories of use – the most essential were called Preference Category I, limited to 2% of lines of a telephone exchange. According to a British government document, they were intended to be limited to "lines vital to the prosecution of war and to national survival". The second category – Preference Category II – were for lines needed for the community and these and Preference Category II were limited in total to 10% of the exchange. All other users were in Category III.

Within the Cold War, the GTPS would have been activated in the “Transition To War” period.

The scheme was established in the 1950s. The scheme ceased to accept new numbers from 2013 due to the replacement by service providers of the infrastructure over which the scheme operated. The scheme was decommissioned in 2017.

Phones on the scheme included armed forces headquarters, local authority emergency planning centres, emergency services such as police, fire and ambulance and public telephone boxes. Since 1992 the United Kingdom Warning and Monitoring Organisation and Royal Observer Corps operational lines have been deleted from the scheme.

A similar scheme limiting mobile telephone access is called MTPAS (formerly ACCOLC).

== See also ==
- AUTOVON
- Civil Contingencies Secretariat
