= ACCOLC =

Cellular technology

ACCOLC (Access Overload Control) was a procedure in the United Kingdom for restricting mobile telephone usage in the event of emergencies. It is similar to the GTPS (Government Telephone Preference Scheme) for landlines.

This scheme allowed the mobile telephone networks to restrict access in a specific area to registered numbers only and is normally invoked by the Police Incident Commander (although it can be invoked by the Cabinet Office). The emergency services are responsible for registering their key numbers in advance.

ACCOLC was replaced by MTPAS (Mobile Telecommunication Privileged Access Scheme) in 2009.

== Purpose ==
The purpose of ACCOLC (US) was to restrict non-essential access to cellular phone networks during emergencies. This actively prevents unnecessary usage from congesting the cell networks, thus allowing emergency services personnel priority for communications. It also serves to control information flow in and out of a declared emergency area.

Mobile networks can become overwhelmed by a high concentration of calls that often occur immediately after a major incident. Reliable access to the mobile networks, even during times when an exceptionally large number of calls are being made, is achieved by installing a special SIM (subscriber identity module) card in the telephone handset. Special SIMs are only available to entitled users within the emergency services community, and not to members of the public.

Verizon Wireless in the United States has also implemented ACCOLC on its wireless networks, the modalities of use may differ from those in Britain especially with regards to ACCOLC being activated permanently on the network.

== Implementation ==
In an emergency situation, the mobile network operator can implement ACCOLC onto specific mobile cell sites (that cover the area of the required restriction). Most systems allow the operator to allow/restrict specific Access Class levels to gain access to the cell sites. The customer's SIM card is provisioned with an Access Class level between 0 and 15. Most SIM cards will be coded with a random access class level between 0 and 9. For special case mobile customers – e.g. emergency services, government officials, civil defence, etc. they will be issued with a SIM card with a high access class value (between 10 and 15). When the mobile operator needs to implement ACCOLC restriction, they will update the configuration on the specified cell sites. The access class value is a field that is transmitted in the broadcast channel of the cell. Under normal conditions, access class levels 0 – 15 are allowed. The SIM card compares what is allowed to its own access class level. If the allowed access class levels being broadcast by the cell site does not match what is on the SIM card, then the mobile device cannot access that cell – for any services.

== Use ==
ACCOLC was deployed at the Hillsborough disaster.

== See also ==
- Civil Contingencies Secretariat
- Government Telephone Preference Scheme
- US Nationwide Wireless Priority Service
