= Airport improvement fee =

Fee charged by some airports to fund expansion projects

An airport improvement fee or embarkation fee or airport tax or service charge or service fee is an additional fee charged to departing and connecting passengers at an airport. It is levied by government or an airport management corporation and the proceeds are usually intended for funding of major airport improvements or expansion or airport service. Some airports do not levy these fees on connecting passengers who do not leave the airport or whose connecting flight is within a specific timeframe after they arrive.

In the United States, the federal passenger facility charge (PFCs) program allows the collection of PFC fees up to $4.50 for every enplaned passenger at commercial airports controlled by public agencies. Airports use these fees to fund FAA-approved projects that enhance safety, security, or capacity; reduce noise; or increase air carrier competition. Federal law limits use of PFC funds strictly to the above categories.

Depending on the location, the airport improvement fee is included in the cost of traveller's airline ticket, in which case the airline will forward the fee to proper agency. However, in some locations the fee must be paid at the point of embarkation. This often creates difficulties for departing passengers who are unfamiliar with this type of procedure, or for departing international passengers who have already exchanged all their local currency. The amount varies usually between US$10 and $30. In some instances, the fee continues to be charged long after construction has been completed (e.g. Ottawa Macdonald–Cartier International Airport). A legitimate reason for this is that the airport must finance the cost of the improvement and then pays off these costs over an extended period of time.

Airports currently collecting an explicit airport improvement fee include:

- Ministro Pistarini International Airport (Ezeiza), Buenos Aires, Argentina
- Almost all Brazilian airports administered by Infraero
- Almost all Canadian international airports
- All airports in China
- Ramón Villeda Morales International Airport San Pedro Sula, Honduras
- Indira Gandhi International Airport New Delhi, India
- All airports in Indonesia
- Ireland West Airport, Knock, Republic of Ireland
- Jorge Chavez International Airport Lima, Peru
- Almost all public airports in the Philippines
- Carrasco International Airport, Montevideo, Uruguay
- Norwich Airport, Norwich, United Kingdom
- Newquay Airport, Newquay, United Kingdom
- All airports in Jamaica

== See also ==
- Air Passenger Duty, an excise charge levied on passengers departing the United Kingdom
- German air passenger taxes
- The Irish Air Travel Tax
