= Landing fee =

Fee paid to land at a particular airport

A landing fee is a charge paid by an aircraft operator to an airport company for landing at a particular airport. Landing fees can vary greatly between airports, with congested airports, ones where most of the landing slots are held by airlines being able to charge premium prices because of supply and demand, while less congested airports charge less because the demand is not as high. The money generated by landing fees is used to pay for the maintenance or expansion of the airport's buildings, runways, aprons and taxiways.

== Description ==
Landing fees can also be used to attract more flights by keeping the fees low. Some airports, especially general aviation airports, do not charge landing fees.

Landing fees may encompass additional airport provided services. Some airports will charge a single fee for landing and provide gates and check-in facilities as part of that fee. Other airports will charge a lower fee for landing but will charge airlines for the use of gates and check-in facilities.

Landing fees at various airports cannot be compared because a number of factors affect the amount of the fee. For example, many airports in the United States receive subsidies from the FAA while airports in Canada do not. Canadian airports are actually "taxed" in the form of ground rent.

Fees can be based on any number of factors including weight, number of seats, time of day, aircraft home airport, and operator class. Some airports may charge a fee for specific types of operators, such as Part 135 or 121.

Some airports (like Santa Monica (KSMO)) charge landing fees to dissuade General Aviation pilots from landing at the airport.
