= Air Passenger Duty =

Tax on flights originating or terminating in the UK

Air Passenger Duty (APD) is an excise duty which is charged on the carriage of passengers flying from a United Kingdom or Isle of Man airport on an aircraft that has an authorised take-off weight of more than 5.7 tonnes or more than twenty seats for passengers. It is a type of departure tax. The duty is not payable by inbound international passengers who are booked to continue their journey (to an international destination) within 24 hours of their scheduled time of arrival in the UK. (The same exemption applies to booked onward domestic flights, but the time limits are shorter and more complex.) If a passenger "stops over" for more than 24 hours (or the domestic limit, if applicable), duty is payable in full.

== History ==
Air Passenger Duty was introduced in 1994 by the then chancellor of the Exchequer, Kenneth Clarke. Clarke regarded it as anomalous that fuel duty was not levied on air transport, but international agreements prevented his levying a duty on aircraft kerosene. As an alternative, Clarke introduced Air Passenger Duty, a levy collected by airlines on passengers who start their journeys at UK airports. It was initially set at £5 for European flights and £10 for long-haul flights. Children below one year of age were exempt. When APD was first introduced, the return journey of a UK domestic flight was exempt from APD. However, this was deemed to be inconsistent with European Union competition rules. Return flights within the UK have incurred two APD payments since 2001. The subsequent chancellor, Gordon Brown, introduced a double rate of APD for business-class and first-class passengers. His successor, George Osborne, reduced the duty on the most expensive long-haul bands. Since 2016 children below the age of 16 have been exempt from APD provided they are travelling in basic economy class.

== Rates ==
Air Passenger Duty charges take distance into account, making long distance flying significantly more expensive. One of the stated benefits of APD was to offset the environmental impact of air travel (see below) although the tax takes no account of the efficiency of the aircraft and flows into general revenue.

Band - from 1 April 2026 -	Reduced rate – for travel in lowest class available on aircraft (Note: If the seating in the lowest class has seats spaced at more than 1,016 millimetres (40.0 in) then the Standard rate applies. "Excise Notice 550: Air Passenger Duty". HM Treasury.; Flights from Northern Ireland have been charged at Band A from 1 November 2011.; From 1 April 2013, APD was extended to cover flights on "business jets". (Source: Revenue and Customs website – data retrieved 25 March 2021.))	Standard rate – for any other class of travel	Higher rate: GA flights over 20 tonnes and equipped to carry fewer than 19 passengers
Domestic (Within UK)	£8	£16	£142
Band A (Within EU or EEC or 0 – 2,000 nautical miles)	£15	£32	£142
Band B (2,001 – 5,500 nautical miles)	£102	£244	£1097
Band C (Over 5,500 nautical miles)	£106	£253	£1141

Air passenger duty is paid upon booking, but not collected until an occupied seat flies. Should a passenger be unable to fly they have a right to claim the paid tax back from the airline, although many airlines will charge an administrative fee for this service.

Band A includes the whole of Europe, Morocco, Algeria, Tunisia, Libya, Cyprus, Turkey and Western Russia.

A £0 rate of APD applies to flights from Northern Ireland direct to a band B destination as of 1 November 2011. This is due to Continental Airlines threatening to stop the direct Belfast - Newark flight due to lack of demand because of the tax.

The 2021 UK budget announced changes to the levels of reduced-rate APD. The rate for UK domestic flights is due to halve to £6.50 from April 2023, while the rate for band B is due to increase to £84 in April 2022. From April 2023 band B is set to be split into two bands: the rate for journeys of 2,000–5,500 miles is set to rise to £87, and the rate for journeys over 5,500 miles is set to rise to £91.

== Rates in prior periods ==
Air Passenger Duty was controversially doubled from 1 February 2007, and the lower rate was extended to all the countries within the Single European Sky. This table summarises the changes:

Old rate	Previous rate	February 2007 - October 2009
European destinations, lowest class	£5	£10
European destinations, other classes	£10	£20
Other destinations, lowest class	£20	£40
Other destinations, other classes	£40	£80

Here, 'European destinations' includes countries in the European Economic Area and certain other European countries.

Charges rose on 1 November 2009 and again on 1 November 2010. The distance used to calculate the new rate of APD is the distance between London and the capital city of the destination country as summarised below:

New rate	From Nov 2009	From Nov 2010	From Apr 2012	From Apr 2013
Band A (0 – 2000 miles)	£11	£12	£13	£13
Band B (2001 – 4000 miles)	£45	£60	£65	£67
Band C (4001 – 6000 miles)	£50	£75	£81	£83
Band D (over 6000 miles)	£55	£85	£92	£94

Band – from 1 April 2013 – 31 March 2014	Reduced rate – for travel in lowest class available on aircraft	Standard rate – for any other class of travel
Band A (0 – 2,000 miles)	£13	£26
Band B (2,001 to 4,000 miles)	£67	£134
Band C (4,001 to 6,000 miles)	£83	£166
Band D (Over 6,000 miles)	£94	£188

Band – from 1 April 2014 - 31 March 2015	Reduced rate – for travel in lowest class available on aircraft	Standard rate – for any other class of travel
Band A (0 – 2,000 miles)	£13	£26
Band B (2,001 to 4,000 miles)	£69	£138
Band C (4,001 to 6,000 miles)	£85	£170
Band D (Over 6,000 miles)	£97	£194

Band – from 1 April 2015 - 31 March 2019	Reduced rate – for travel in lowest class available on aircraft	Standard rate – for any other class of travel	Higher rate: GA flights over 20 tonnes and equipped to carry fewer than 19 passengers
Band A (0 – 2,000 miles)	£13	£26	£78
Band B (Over 2,000 miles)	£71	£142	£426

Band – from 1 April 2019 - 31 March 2020	Reduced rate – for travel in lowest class available on aircraft	Standard rate – for any other class of travel	Higher rate: GA flights over 20 tonnes and equipped to carry fewer than 19 passengers
Band A (0 – 2,000 miles)	£13	£26	£78
Band B (Over 2,000 miles)	£78	£172	£515

Band – from 1 April 2020 - 31 March 2021	Reduced rate – for travel in lowest class available on aircraft	Standard rate – for any other class of travel	Higher rate: GA flights over 20 tonnes and equipped to carry fewer than 19 passengers
Band A (0 – 2,000 miles)	£13	£26	£78
Band B (Over 2,000 miles)	£80	£176	£528

== Impact of APD ==
The Treasury forecast that the 2007 rise would cut carbon dioxide emissions by about 0.3 million tonnes a year by 2010-2011, and all greenhouse gas emissions by the equivalent of 0.75 million tonnes of carbon dioxide a year, although that has been disputed.

In 2011, the Treasury launched a consultation on potential revisions to Air Passenger Duty. In their consultation they stated "Air passenger duty is primarily a revenue raising duty which makes an important contribution to the public finances, whilst also giving rise to secondary environmental benefits".

Also in 2011, an alliance of business groups, airports, airlines, destinations and trade associations came together to form the campaign group 'A Fair Tax on Flying', calling for the Treasury to conduct a macro-economic impact-assessment of the tax, and to reform and reduce the tax.

The Chancellor's Autumn Statement, on 29 November 2011, announced an 8% increase in UK APD set for April 2012.

In 2013 a study by PwC, 'The Economic Impact of Air Passenger Duty', found that abolition of APD could provide an initial short-term boost to the level of UK GDP of around 0.45% in the first 12 months, averaging at just under 0.3% per annum between 2013 and 2015. It stated that this increase would permanently raise UK economic output, to the point where the economy could be up to £16 billion larger in the period 2013-15 than under the current system of APD. In addition, it found that abolition would result in an increase in investment and exports, implying investment may rise by 6% in total between 2013 and 2015, with exports rising by 5% in the same period. Almost 60,000 jobs could be created between 2013 and 2020, and although the abolition of APD would result in £3-4 billion in lost revenue to the Treasury, PwC's "cautious" analysis suggests that this would be offset by increased receipts from other taxes. The report concludes that this would lead to a positive net gain of £0.25 billion per annum for the Government, or in other words, that abolishing APD could pay for itself, through increased Government revenue from other sources primarily due to business growth achieved through the benefits brought by abolishing APD.

At the 2014 Budget the Chancellor announced the removal of bands C and D of APD, coming into effect from 1 April 2015. It means that from 2015, the highest APD band levied was band B.

The tourist minister of Kenya, Najib Balala, criticised APD for hurting tourism and economy in developing countries.

== Devolution ==
=== Scotland ===
In August 2015, Scottish Deputy First Minister John Swinney and Infrastructure Secretary Keith Brown jointly chaired the first meeting of the Scottish APD stakeholder forum to begin the process of designing and developing a Scottish APD. The devolution of APD to Scotland in the form of an Air Departure Tax was made possible by the Air Departure Tax (Scotland) Act 2017 which was passed on 20 June 2017 and received royal assent on 25 July 2017. Once the process of devolving APD to Scotland was complete, the Scottish Government intended to reduce the rate by 50%, and eventually abolishing it completely once finances allow. This caused concern that such a move could damage tourism in England.

Air Departure Tax was meant to be introduced to Scotland starting from 1 April 2018. However due to exemption of APD for flights departing from airports in the Highlands and Islands, the UK and Scottish governments agreed to delay the introduction of ADT, while sorting out the issues. In June 2018, the Scottish and UK governments agreed it would not be possible to introduce ADT in April 2019. APD continues to apply to flights departing Scottish airports, and HMRC continues to have responsibility for administering APD in relation to Scottish flights, pending the resolution of the issues.

In 2019 the Scottish Government abandoned its plans to cut Air Departure Tax as the proposals were no longer considered compatible with Scotland's climate change targets.

=== Northern Ireland ===
Air Passenger Duty (Setting of Rate) Act (Northern Ireland) 2012
- Act of the Northern Ireland Assembly
- Northern Ireland Assembly
- Long title: An Act to set the rate of air passenger duty for the purposes of section 30A(3) to (5A) of the Finance Act 1994.
- Citation: 2012 c. 5 (N.I.)

Dates
- Royal assent: 11 December 2012
- Commencement: 1 January 2013

Other legislation
- Amended by: Finance Act 2014
- Relates to: Finance Act 1994

Status: Amended

Text of statute as originally enacted

Text of the Air Passenger Duty (Setting of Rate) Act (Northern Ireland) 2012 as in force today (including any amendments) within the United Kingdom, from legislation.gov.uk.

In 2012 the Northern Ireland Assembly gained the power to adjust Air Passenger Duty, which it did through the Air Passenger Duty (Setting of Rate) Act (Northern Ireland) 2012 (c. 5 (N.I.)).

In June 2017 the Conservative Party and the Democratic Unionist Party agreed to review APD with regard to its possible reduction or abolition for Northern Ireland's airports. APD on direct long-haul flights from Northern Ireland was cut to be the same rate as short-haul flights as of 1 November 2011, reducing the tax then on economy (coach) fares to the US from £60 to £12 and in premium classes (business and first) from £120 to £24.

== See also ==
- Airport improvement fee, a related fee charged by the airport or government
- German air passenger taxes
- Irish Air Travel Tax
- French airplane ticket tax
