= Air Travel Tax =

The Air Travel Tax (Irish: Cáin Aerthaistil) was an Irish tax applied to flights departing from airports in Ireland. It was introduced in the 2009 Budget. Until 28 February 2011, there were two rates of tax, €10 for each passenger flying to an airport more than 300 km (186 miles) from Dublin Airport, and €2 per passenger flying to any other airport within 300 km (186 miles). As the differential rate was considered by the EU to be an interference with the internal market, this was changed to a flat rate of €3 from 1 March 2011. The tax was opposed by airlines and the tourism industry. Transit passengers are excluded.

Initially the €10 tax was going to cover all flights over 300 km (186 miles), but this would have disadvantaged non-Dublin airports. Smaller airports are also excepted, of which only one has any scheduled flights to begin with; as are planes with fewer than 20 passenger seats.

It was abolished in April 2014.

== See also ==
- German air passenger taxes
- The United Kingdom Air Passenger Duty
