= German air passenger taxes =

destination countries listed in: Anlage 1 zum LuftVStG → €15.53 Anlage 2 zum LuftVStG → €39.34 not listed → €70.83

German air passenger taxes are excise duties and other charges levied by the German government on most passengers departing by air, either in addition to the price of the airline ticket or incorporated into the ticket price.

== Ecological departure tax ==
A departure tax is to apply for all departures starting from 1 January 2011. The amount depends on the destination country; the following table shows the minimum payable (agents may charge tax handling costs).

	Rate from May 2024 onward
Countries listed in Anlage 1 zum LuftVStG	€15.53
Countries listed in Anlage 2 zum LuftVStG	€39.34
all other Countries	€70.83
children under 2 without seat	€0.00

=== Band 1 countries and territories ===
- European Union members
- EFTA members
- Albania
- Algeria
- Andorra
- Belarus
- Bosnia and Herzegovina
- Faroe Islands
- Greenland
- Kosovo
- Libya
- Moldova
- Monaco
- Montenegro
- Morocco
- North Macedonia
- Russia
- San Marino
- Serbia
- Tunisia
- Turkey
- Ukraine
- United Kingdom
- Vatican

=== Band 2 countries and territories ===
- Afghanistan
- Armenia
- Azerbaijan
- Bahrain
- Benin
- Burkina Faso
- Cameroon
- Cape Verde
- Central African Republic
- Chad
- Djibouti
- Egypt
- Eritrea
- Equatorial Guinea
- Ethiopia
- Gabon
- Gambia
- Georgia
- Guinea
- Guinea-Bissau
- Iran
- Iraq
- Israel
- Ivory Coast
- Jordan
- Kazakhstan
- Kyrgyzstan
- Kuwait
- Lebanon
- Liberia
- Mali
- Mauritania
- Niger
- Nigeria
- Oman
- Pakistan
- Palestine
- Qatar
- Sao Tome and Principe
- Saudi Arabia
- Senegal
- Sierra Leone
- South Sudan
- Sudan
- Syria
- Tajikistan
- Togo
- Turkmenistan
- Uganda
- United Arab Emirates
- Uzbekistan
- Yemen

== See also ==
- Air Passenger Duty for the United Kingdom departure duty
- Carbon tax on airline tickets
